= Bathycongrus parapolyporus =

Conservation status
- Data Deficient (IUCN 3.1)

Scientific classification
- Kingdom: Animalia
- Phylum: Chordata
- Class: Actinopterygii
- Order: Anguilliformes
- Family: Congridae
- Genus: Bathycongrus
- Species: B. parapolyporus

Binomial name
- Bathycongrus parapolyporus Karmovskaya, 2009

Species of fish

Bathycongrus parapolyporus is an eel in the family Congridae (conger/garden eels). It was described by Emma Stanislavovna Karmovskaya in 2009. It is a tropical, marine eel which is known from the western central Pacific Ocean, including Fiji, Lakeba Island, the South China Sea, and Vietnam. It is known to dwell at a depth of 310 metres. Females can reach a maximum total length of 34.8 centimetres.

The species epithet "parapolyporus" means "near to many pored" in Ancient Greek, and refers to the species' similar features to Bathycongrus polyporus.
