= Acromycter alcocki =

Conservation status
- Least Concern (IUCN 3.1)

Scientific classification
- Kingdom: Animalia
- Phylum: Chordata
- Class: Actinopterygii
- Order: Anguilliformes
- Family: Congridae
- Genus: Acromycter
- Species: A. alcocki

Binomial name
- Acromycter alcocki (C. H. Gilbert & Cramer, 1897)

Synonyms
- Promyllantor alcocki Gilbert & Cramer, 1897

Species of fish

Acromycter alcocki is an eel in the family Congridae (conger/garden eels). It was described by Charles Henry Gilbert and Frank Cramer in 1897, originally under the genus Promyllantor. It is a marine, deep water-dwelling eel which is known from Hawaii, in the eastern central Pacific Ocean. It dwells at a depth range of 388–640 metres. Males can reach a maximum total length of 25.3 centimetres.
