= Acromycter nezumi =

Conservation status
- Least Concern (IUCN 3.1)

Scientific classification
- Kingdom: Animalia
- Phylum: Chordata
- Class: Actinopterygii
- Order: Anguilliformes
- Family: Congridae
- Genus: Acromycter
- Species: A. nezumi

Binomial name
- Acromycter nezumi (Asano, 1958)

Synonyms
- Promyllantor nezumi Asano, 1958

Species of fish

Acromycter nezumi is an eel in the family Congridae (conger/garden eels). It was described by Hirotoshi Asano in 1958, originally under the genus Promyllantor. It is a marine, temperate water-dwelling eel which is known from Japan, in the northwestern Pacific Ocean. Males can reach a maximum total length of 40 centimetres.
