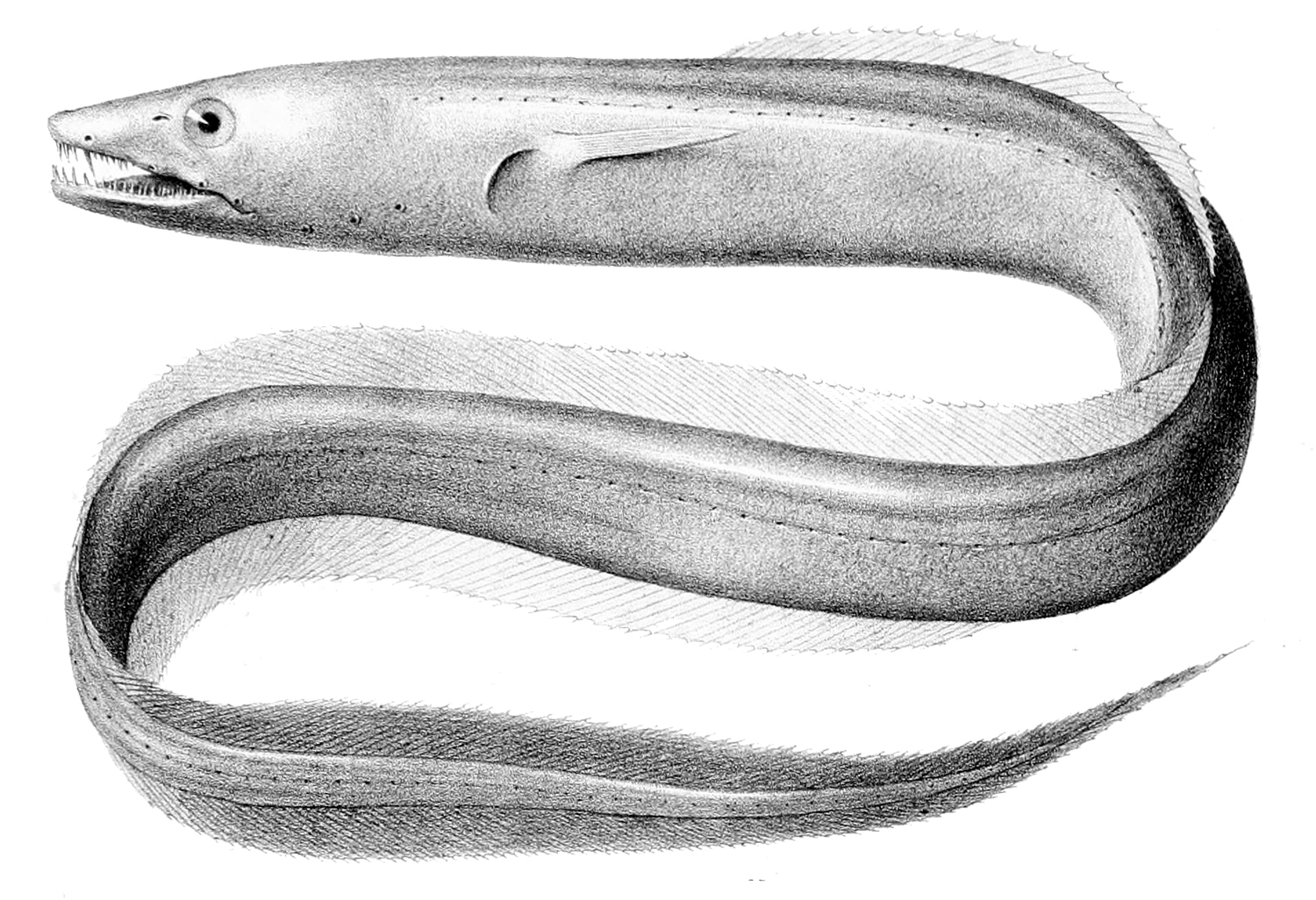

Conservation status
- Least Concern (IUCN 3.1)

Scientific classification
- Kingdom: Animalia
- Phylum: Chordata
- Class: Actinopterygii
- Order: Anguilliformes
- Family: Congridae
- Genus: Bathyuroconger
- Species: B. vicinus

Binomial name
- Bathyuroconger vicinus (Vaillant, 1888)

Synonyms
- Uroconger vicinus Vaillant, 1888; Uroconger braueri Weber & de Beaufort, 1916; Bathyuroconger braueri (Weber & de Beaufort, 1916)

= Large-toothed conger =

Species of fish

The large-toothed conger (Bathyuroconger vicinus, also known as the largetooth conger) is an eel belonging to the family Congridae (conger/garden eels). It was described by Léon Vaillant in 1888, originally as a species of the genus Uroconger.

== Distribution ==
It is a marine, deep water-dwelling eel which is known from the eastern central, southeastern, and western central Atlantic, in Benin, Cameroon, Cape Verde, Colombia, French Guiana, Gabon, Ghana, Guinea, Guyana, Honduras, Malaysia, Mexico, Namibia, Nicaragua, Nigeria, Panama, South Africa, Suriname, Togo, the United States, and Venezuela. It is known to dwell in sandy regions at a depth range of 120–1318 meters, occurring most frequently between 900–1000 m. Males can reach a maximum total length of 88 centimeters.

Northwestern Pacific populations of the large-toothed conger have been recognized as belonging to four separate species, B. albus, B. dolichosomus, B. fowleri, and B. hawaiiensis.

== Biology ==
The Large-toothed conger feeds predominantly on finfish. It is used as a food fish in some countries, and is also sometimes caught by fisheries harvesting other species. The IUCN redlist currently lists it as Least Concern, in part due to its widespread distribution and also partly because its use/interaction with fisheries does not occur throughout its entire range, nor is it thought to be at risk of overharvesting due to its deep water nature.
