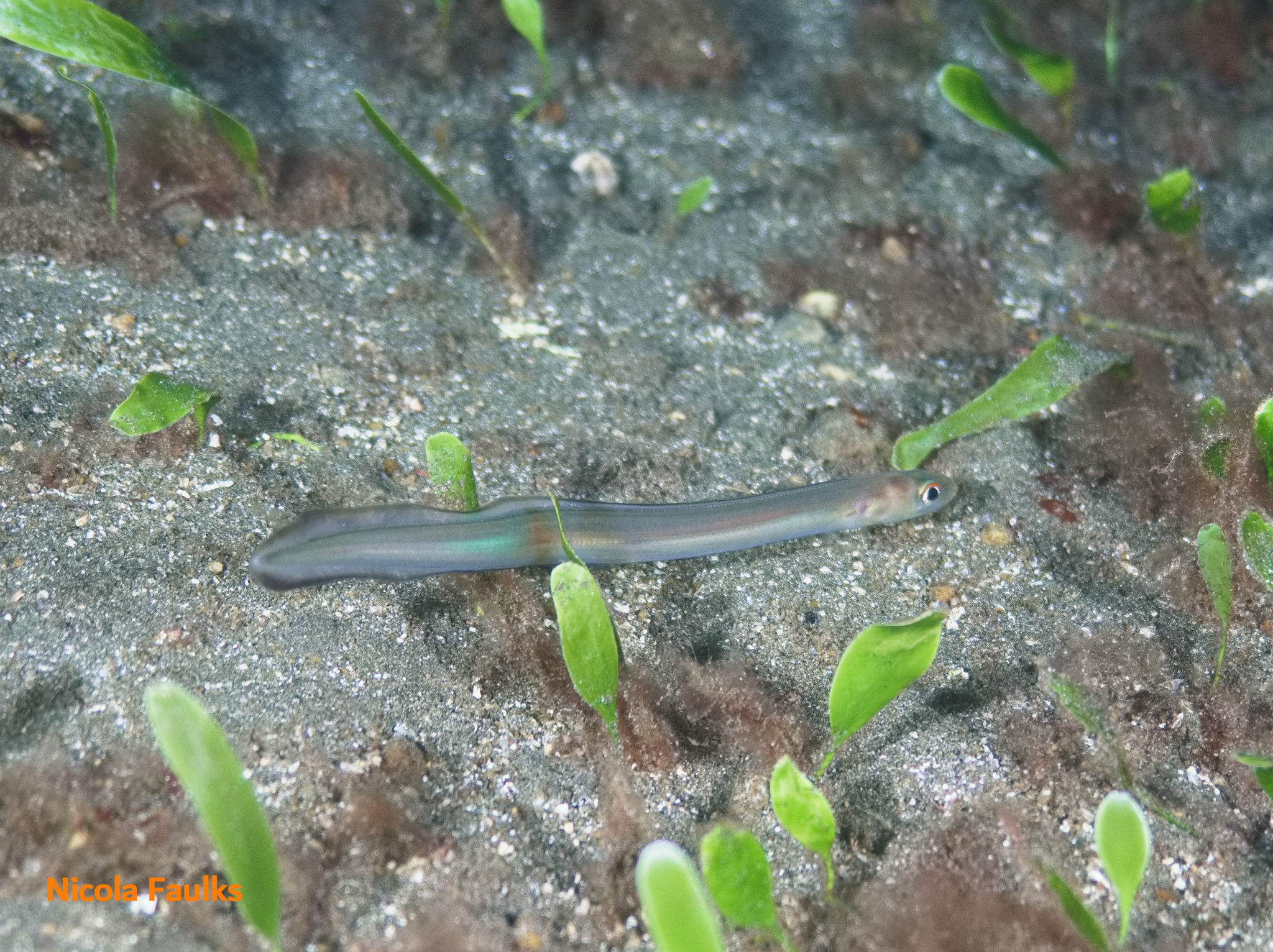
- Ariosoma balearicum

Scientific classification
- Kingdom: Animalia
- Phylum: Chordata
- Class: Actinopterygii
- Order: Anguilliformes
- Family: Congridae
- Subfamily: Bathymyrinae; J. E. Böhlke, 1949

Subfamilies
- Genera

Synonyms
- Helmichthyoidei Bleeker, 1856; Anagoinae Asano, 1962

= Bathymyrinae =

Subfamily of fishes

Bathymyrinae is a subfamily of marine ray-finned fishes belonging to the family Congridae, which includes the conger and garden eels. The eels of this subfamily are most diverse in the Indo-Pacific region but are also found in both the Eastern and Western Atlantic Oceans.

== Genera ==
Bathymyrinae has the following genera classified within it:

- Ariosoma Swainson, 1838
- Bathymyrus Alcock, 1889
- Chiloconger Myers & Wade, 1941
- Kenyaconger D. G. Smith & Karmovskaya, 2003
- Parabathymyrus Kamohara, 1938
- Paraconger Kanazawa, 1961
- Rostroconger D. G. Smith, 2015
- †Paracongroides Blot, 1978 (Eocene of Italy)
- †Pavelichthys Bannikov & Fedotov, 1984 (lower Oligocene of Northern Caucasus)
