= Rubbernose conger =

Scientific classification
- Domain: Eukaryota
- Kingdom: Animalia
- Phylum: Chordata
- Class: Actinopterygii
- Order: Anguilliformes
- Family: Congridae
- Genus: Macrocephenchelys
- Species: M. brevirostris

Binomial name
- Macrocephenchelys brevirostris (Chen & Weng, 1967)

Synonyms
- Rhynchoconger brevirostris Chen & Weng, 1967

Species of fish

The Rubbernose conger (Macrocephenchelys brevirostris) is an eel in the family Congridae (conger/garden eels). It was described by Johnson T. F. Chen and Herman Ting-Chen Weng in 1967, originally under the genus Rhynchoconger. It is a marine, tropical eel which is known from the western Pacific Ocean, including Taiwan and Australia. It dwells at a depth range of 280 to 440 metres (920 to 1,440 ft). Males can reach a maximum total length of 36.7 centimetres (1.20 ft).
