= Neighbor conger =

Conservation status
- Least Concern (IUCN 3.1)

Scientific classification
- Kingdom: Animalia
- Phylum: Chordata
- Class: Actinopterygii
- Order: Anguilliformes
- Family: Congridae
- Genus: Bathycongrus
- Species: B. vicinalis

Binomial name
- Bathycongrus vicinalis (Garman, 1899)

Synonyms
- Uroconger vicinalis Garman, 1899; Rhechias vicinalis (Garman, 1899)

Species of fish

The neighbor conger (Bathycongrus vicinalis) is an eel in the family Congridae (conger/garden eels). It was described by Samuel Garman in 1899, originally under the genus Uroconger. It is a marine, deep water-dwelling eel that is known from the southwestern and western central Atlantic Ocean, including the Bahamas, Brazil, Cuba, and Mexico. It dwells at a depth range of 101–503 metres (331–1,650 ft). Males can reach a maximum total length of 46.2 centimetres (18.2 in).

Due to its widespread distribution, and an estimated lack of threats resulting from its deep water nature, the IUCN redlist currently lists the neighbor conger as Least Concern.
