= Shorthead conger =

Conservation status
- Least Concern (IUCN 3.1)

Scientific classification
- Kingdom: Animalia
- Phylum: Chordata
- Class: Actinopterygii
- Order: Anguilliformes
- Family: Congridae
- Genus: Bathycongrus
- Species: B. macrurus

Binomial name
- Bathycongrus macrurus (Gilbert, 1891)

Synonyms
- Ophisoma macrurum Gilbert, 1891

Species of fish

The shorthead conger (Bathycongrus macrurus) is an eel in the family Congridae (conger/garden eels). It was described by Charles Henry Gilbert in 1891, originally under the genus Ophisoma. It is a marine, deep water-dwelling eel which is known from the Gulf of California to Panama, in the eastern central Pacific Ocean. It dwells at a depth range of 265–590 metres. Males can reach a maximum total length of 25 centimetres.
