= Largehead conger =

Conservation status
- Least Concern (IUCN 3.1)

Scientific classification
- Kingdom: Animalia
- Phylum: Chordata
- Class: Actinopterygii
- Order: Anguilliformes
- Family: Congridae
- Genus: Bathycongrus
- Species: B. varidens

Binomial name
- Bathycongrus varidens (Garman, 1899)

Synonyms
- Uroconger varidens Garman, 1899

Species of fish

The largehead conger (Bathycongrus varidens) is an eel in the family Congridae (conger/garden eels). It was described by Samuel Garman in 1899, originally under the genus Uroconger. It is a marine, deep water-dwelling eel which is known from southern Canada to Chile, in the eastern Pacific Ocean. It dwells at a depth range of 165–935 metres. Males can reach a maximum total length of 100 centimetres.
