= Hairy conger =

Hairy conger is a common name for several fishes and may refer to:

- Bassanago albescens, native to the south Atlantic and southeastern Pacific Oceans
- Bassanago hirsutus, native to the southwestern Pacific Ocean
