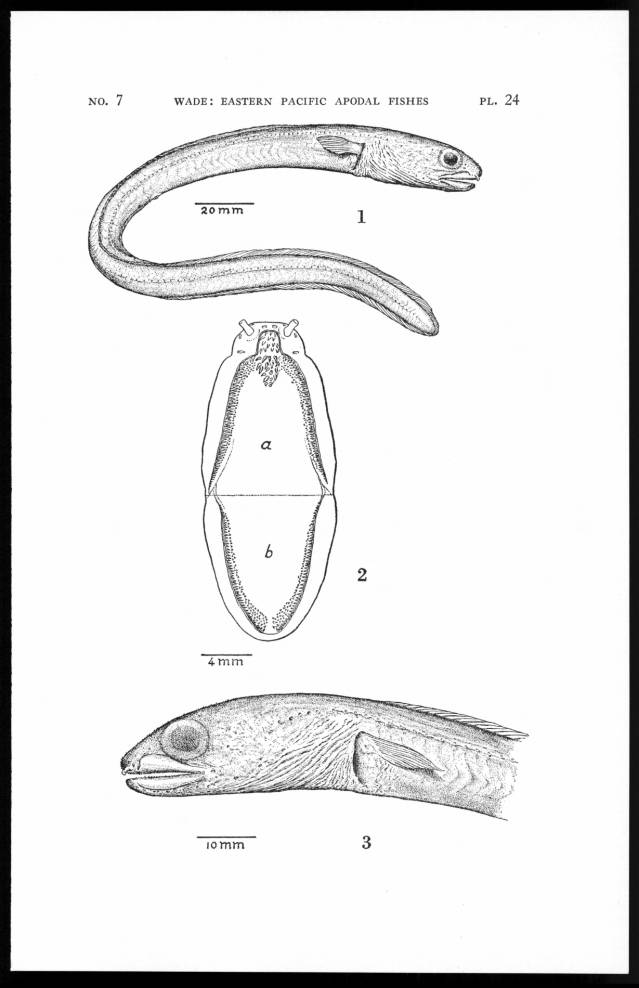

Conservation status
- Least Concern (IUCN 3.1)

Scientific classification
- Kingdom: Animalia
- Phylum: Chordata
- Class: Actinopterygii
- Order: Anguilliformes
- Family: Congridae
- Genus: Paraconger
- Species: P. similis

Binomial name
- Paraconger similis (Wade, 1946)

Synonyms
- Chiloconger similis Wade, 1946

= Shorttail conger =

Species of fish

The shorttail conger (Paraconger similis) is an eel in the family Congridae (conger/garden eels). It was described by Charles Barkley Wade in 1946, originally under the genus Chiloconger. It is a subtropical, marine eel which is known from the eastern and southeastern Pacific Ocean, including Costa Rica, Ecuador, El Salvador, Guatemala, Honduras, Mexico, Nicaragua, the Galapagos Islands, Panama, and Revillagigedo. It dwells at a depth range of 108–150 metres. Males can reach a maximum total length of 30 centimetres.

Due to its widespread distribution, lack of known threats, and lack of observed population decline, the IUCN redlist currently lists the Shorttail conger as Least Concern.
