= Maputo conger =

Conservation status
- Least Concern (IUCN 3.1)

Scientific classification
- Kingdom: Animalia
- Phylum: Chordata
- Class: Actinopterygii
- Order: Anguilliformes
- Family: Congridae
- Genus: Bathymyrus
- Species: B. smithi

Binomial name
- Bathymyrus smithi Castle, 1968

Species of fish

The Maputo conger (Bathymyrus smithi) is an eel in the family Congridae (conger/garden eels). It was described by Peter Henry John Castle in 1968. It is a marine, deep water-dwelling eel which also inhabits brackish waters, and is known from the Limpopo River and the Indian Ocean. It is known to dwell at a depth range of 470–490 metres. Males can reach a maximum total length of 58 centimetres.
