= Parabathymyrus brachyrhynchus =

Conservation status
- Least Concern (IUCN 3.1)

Scientific classification
- Kingdom: Animalia
- Phylum: Chordata
- Class: Actinopterygii
- Order: Anguilliformes
- Family: Congridae
- Genus: Parabathymyrus
- Species: P. brachyrhynchus

Binomial name
- Parabathymyrus brachyrhynchus (Fowler, 1934)

Synonyms
- Ariosoma brachyrhynchus Fowler, 1934; Arisoma brachyrhynchus Fowler, 1934 (misspelling)

Species of fish

Parabathymyrus brachyrhynchus is an eel in the family Congridae (conger/garden eels). It was described by Henry Weed Fowler in 1934, originally under the genus Ariosoma. It is a marine, deep water-dwelling eel which is known from the western central Pacific Ocean. It dwells at a maximum depth of 289 metres. Males can reach a maximum total length of 33 centimetres.

The species epithet, "brachyrhynchus", refers to the short snout of the species.
