= Congriscus marquesaensis =

Conservation status
- Least Concern (IUCN 3.1)

Scientific classification
- Kingdom: Animalia
- Phylum: Chordata
- Class: Actinopterygii
- Order: Anguilliformes
- Family: Congridae
- Genus: Congriscus
- Species: C. marquesaensis

Binomial name
- Congriscus marquesaensis Karmovskaya, 2004

Species of fish

Congriscus marquesaensis is an eel in the family Congridae (conger/garden eels). It was described by Emma Stanislavovna Karmovskaya in 2004. It is a marine, deep water-dwelling eel which is known from the Marquesas Islands (from which its species epithet is derived), in the eastern central Pacific Ocean. It dwells at a depth range of 391–408 metres. Males can reach a maximum total length of 27.3 centimetres.
