= Xenomystax austrinus =

Scientific classification
- Kingdom: Animalia
- Phylum: Chordata
- Class: Actinopterygii
- Division: Teleostei
- Order: Anguilliformes
- Family: Congridae
- Genus: Xenomystax
- Species: X. austrinus

Binomial name
- Xenomystax austrinus D. G. Smith & Kanazawa, 1989

Species of fish

Xenomystax austrinus is an eel in the family Congridae (conger/garden eels). It was described by David G. Smith and Robert H. Kanazawa in 1989. It is a marine, deep water-dwelling eel which is known from the western central Atlantic Ocean. It is known to dwell at a depth range of 458 to 732 meters (1,503 to 2,402 ft).
