= Bathycongrus macrocercus =

Conservation status
- Least Concern (IUCN 3.1)

Scientific classification
- Kingdom: Animalia
- Phylum: Chordata
- Class: Actinopterygii
- Order: Anguilliformes
- Family: Congridae
- Genus: Bathycongrus
- Species: B. macrocercus

Binomial name
- Bathycongrus macrocercus (Alcock, 1894)

Synonyms
- Congromuraena macrocercus Alcock, 1894

Species of fish

Bathycongrus macrocercus is an eel in the family Congridae (conger/garden eels). It was described by Alfred William Alcock in 1894, originally under the genus Congromuraena. It is a marine, deep water-dwelling eel which is known from the Andaman Islands, in the eastern Indian Ocean.
