= Bignose conger =

Conservation status
- Least Concern (IUCN 3.1)

Scientific classification
- Kingdom: Animalia
- Phylum: Chordata
- Class: Actinopterygii
- Order: Anguilliformes
- Family: Congridae
- Genus: Rhynchoconger
- Species: R. nitens

Binomial name
- Rhynchoconger nitens (D. S. Jordan & Bollman, 1890)

Synonyms
- Ophisoma nitens Jordan & Bollman, 1890; Hildebrandia nitens (Jordan & Bollman, 1890)

Species of fish

The bignose conger (Rhynchoconger nitens, also known as the needletail conger) is an eel in the family Congridae (conger/garden eels). It was described by David Starr Jordan and Charles Harvey Bollman in 1890. It is a tropical, marine eel which is known from the eastern central and southeastern Pacific Ocean, including Chile, Colombia, Costa Rica, Ecuador, El Salvador, Guatemala, Honduras, Mexico, Nicaragua, Panama, and Peru. It dwells at a depth range of 25–90 metres. Males can reach a maximum total length of 40 centimetres, but more commonly reach a TL of 30 cm.

Due to its widespread distribution, lack of known threats, and lack of observed population decline, the IUCN redlist currently Lists the bignose conger as Least Concern.
