= Promyllantor adenensis =

Conservation status
- Least Concern (IUCN 3.1)

Scientific classification
- Kingdom: Animalia
- Phylum: Chordata
- Class: Actinopterygii
- Order: Anguilliformes
- Family: Congridae
- Genus: Promyllantor
- Species: P. adenensis

Binomial name
- Promyllantor adenensis (Klausewitz, 1991)

Synonyms
- Bathycongrellus adenensis Klausewitz, 1991

Species of fish

Promyllantor adenensis is an eel in the family Congridae (conger/garden eels). It was described by Wolfgang Klausewitz in 1991, originally under the genus Bathycongrellus. It is a marine, deep water-dwelling eel which is known from the Indo-Western Pacific, including the Gulf of Aden and the Lord Howe Seamount Chain. It is known to dwell at a depth range of 2,227 to 2,325 metres (7,306 to 7,628 ft). Males can reach a maximum total length of 51.2 centimetres (20.2 in).
