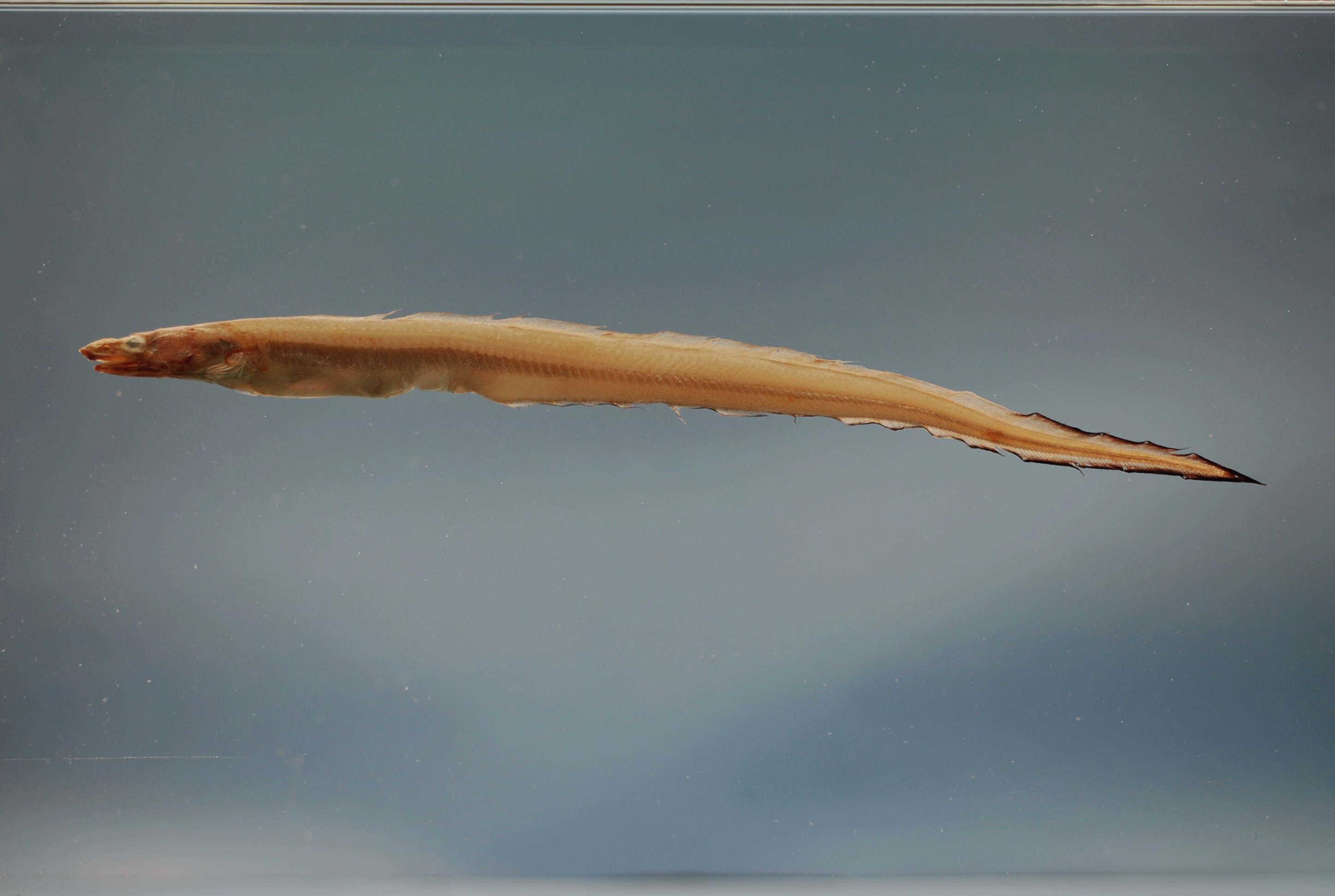

Conservation status
- Least Concern (IUCN 3.1)

Scientific classification
- Kingdom: Animalia
- Phylum: Chordata
- Class: Actinopterygii
- Order: Anguilliformes
- Family: Congridae
- Genus: Rhynchoconger
- Species: R. flavus

Binomial name
- Rhynchoconger flavus (Goode & T. H. Bean, 1896)

Synonyms
- Congermuraena flava Goode & Bean, 1896; Congrina flava (Goode & Bean, 1896); Hildebrandia flava (Goode & Bean, 1896); Rhechias flava (Goode & Bean, 1896); Rhynchoconger flava (Goode & Bean, 1896)

= Yellow conger =

Species of fish

The yellow conger (Rhynchoconger flavus) is an eel in the family Congridae (conger/garden eels). It was described by George Brown Goode and Tarleton Hoffman Bean in 1896. It is a marine, tropical eel which is known from the Gulf of Mexico and the mouth of the Amazon River, in the western Atlantic Ocean. It dwells at a depth range of 26 to 183 meters (85 to 600 ft), and inhabits soft sediments. Males can reach a maximum total length of 150 centimeters (59 in), but more commonly reach a TL of 30 centimeters (12 in).
