= Margintail conger =

Conservation status
- Least Concern (IUCN 3.1)

Scientific classification
- Kingdom: Animalia
- Phylum: Chordata
- Class: Actinopterygii
- Order: Anguilliformes
- Family: Congridae
- Genus: Paraconger
- Species: P. caudilimbatus

Binomial name
- Paraconger caudilimbatus (Poey, 1867)

Synonyms
- Echelus caudilimbatus Poey, 1867

Species of fish

The margintail conger (Paraconger caudilimbatus) is an eel in the family Congridae (conger/garden eels). It was described by Felipe Poey in 1867, originally under the genus Echelus. It is a subtropical, marine eel which is known from the western Atlantic Ocean, including the United States (North Carolina and Florida), Bahamas, the Gulf of Mexico, Cuba, Venezuela, and Colombia. It is known to dwell at a depth range of 35–75 meters, and leads a benthic lifestyle, inhabiting sand and mud in the neritic zone. Males reach an average total length of 35 centimeters, but can reach a maximum TL of 51 cm.
