= Bathymyrus echinorhynchus =

Conservation status
- Least Concern (IUCN 3.1)

Scientific classification
- Kingdom: Animalia
- Phylum: Chordata
- Class: Actinopterygii
- Division: Teleostei
- Order: Anguilliformes
- Family: Congridae
- Genus: Bathymyrus
- Species: B. echinorhynchus

Binomial name
- Bathymyrus echinorhynchus Alcock, 1889

Species of fish

Bathymyrus echinorhynchus is an eel in the family Congridae (conger/garden eels). It was described by Alfred William Alcock in 1889. It is a tropical, marine eel which is known from the Arabian Sea, in the northern and western Indian Ocean.
