= Congriscus maldivensis =

Conservation status
- Least Concern (IUCN 3.1)

Scientific classification
- Kingdom: Animalia
- Phylum: Chordata
- Class: Actinopterygii
- Order: Anguilliformes
- Family: Congridae
- Genus: Congriscus
- Species: C. maldivensis

Binomial name
- Congriscus maldivensis (Norman, 1939)

Synonyms
- Conger maldivensis Norman, 1939; Thalassenchelys foliaceus Castle & Raju, 1975

Species of fish

Congriscus maldivensis is an eel in the family Congridae (conger/garden eels). It was described by John Roxborough Norman in 1939, originally under the genus Conger. It is a marine, deep water-dwelling eel which is known from the Indo-Western Pacific, including Australia, Fiji, Madagascar, Maldives (from which its species epithet is derived), New Caledonia, the Philippines, Vanuatu, and Wallis and Futuna. It dwells at a depth range of 354–820 metres (1,161–2,690 ft). It can reach a maximum standard length of 35.2 centimetres (13.9 in).
