= Parabathymyrus karrerae =

Conservation status
- Least Concern (IUCN 3.1)

Scientific classification
- Kingdom: Animalia
- Phylum: Chordata
- Class: Actinopterygii
- Order: Anguilliformes
- Family: Congridae
- Genus: Parabathymyrus
- Species: P. karrerae

Binomial name
- Parabathymyrus karrerae Karmovskaya, 1991

Species of fish

Parabathymyrus karrerae is an eel in the family Congridae (conger/garden eels). It was described by Emma Stanislavovna Karmovskaya in 1991. It is a marine, deep water-dwelling eel which is known from Cape Tala and Madagascar, in the western Indian Ocean. It dwells at a depth range of 260–405 metres.

The species epithet honours ichthyologist Christine Karrer.
