= Blachea xenobranchialis =

Conservation status
- Least Concern (IUCN 3.1)

Scientific classification
- Kingdom: Animalia
- Phylum: Chordata
- Class: Actinopterygii
- Order: Anguilliformes
- Family: Congridae
- Genus: Blachea
- Species: B. xenobranchialis

Binomial name
- Blachea xenobranchialis Karrer & D. G. Smith, 1980

Species of fish

Blachea xenobranchialis, the frillgill conger is an eel in the family Congridae (conger/garden eels), and the type species in the genus Blachea. It was described by Christine Karrer and David G. Smith in 1980. It is a tropical, marine eel which is known from northwestern Australia, in the Indo-West Pacific. It dwells at a depth range of 348–385 metres, and leads a benthic lifestyle, inhabiting continental shelves and slopes. Males can reach a maximum total length of 47.5 centimetres, while females can reach a maximum TL of 37.5 cm.

The species epithet "xenobranchialis" means "strange gill" in Ancient Greek, and refers to the eel's unusual free branchiostegals.
