= Lined conger =

Conservation status
- Least Concern (IUCN 3.1)

Scientific classification
- Kingdom: Animalia
- Phylum: Chordata
- Class: Actinopterygii
- Order: Anguilliformes
- Family: Congridae
- Genus: Bathycongrus
- Species: B. guttulatus

Binomial name
- Bathycongrus guttulatus (Günther, 1887)

Synonyms
- Congromuraena guttulata Günther, 1887; Ariosoma guttulata (Günther, 1887); Conger guttulata (Günther, 1887); Congrellus guttulatus (Günther, 1887); Rhechias guttulatus (Günther, 1887); Congrellus roosendaali Weber & de Beaufort, 1916; Bathycongrus roosendaali (Weber & de Beaufort, 1916); Bathycongrus stimpsoni Fowler, 1934

Species of fish

The lined conger (Bathycongrus guttulatus) is an eel in the family Congridae (conger/garden eels). It was described by Albert Günther in 1887, originally under the genus Congromuraena. It is a marine, deep water-dwelling eel which is known from the western Indian Ocean to the southwestern Pacific Ocean, including Indonesia and Hawaii. It dwells at a depth range of 270–1270 metres.
