= Bathymyrus simus =

Conservation status
- Least Concern (IUCN 3.1)

Scientific classification
- Kingdom: Animalia
- Phylum: Chordata
- Class: Actinopterygii
- Order: Anguilliformes
- Family: Congridae
- Genus: Bathymyrus
- Species: B. simus

Binomial name
- Bathymyrus simus Smith, 1965

Species of fish

Bathymyrus simus is an eel in the family Congridae (conger/garden eels). It was described by J. L. B. Smith in 1965. It is a tropical, marine eel which inhabits moderately deep water. It is known from the Penghu Islands and Vietnam, in the western Pacific Ocean. Males can reach a maximum total length of 19.5 centimetres.
