= Bathycongrus nasicus =

Conservation status
- Least Concern (IUCN 3.1)

Scientific classification
- Kingdom: Animalia
- Phylum: Chordata
- Class: Actinopterygii
- Order: Anguilliformes
- Family: Congridae
- Genus: Bathycongrus
- Species: B. nasicus

Binomial name
- Bathycongrus nasicus (Alcock, 1894)

Synonyms
- Congromuraena nasica Alcock, 1894

Species of fish

Bathycongrus nasicus is an eel in the family Congridae (conger/garden eels). It was described by Alfred William Alcock in 1894, originally under the genus Congromuraena. It is a marine, deep water-dwelling eel which is known from the Indian Ocean, including the Arabian Sea, the Bay of Bengal, and the Gulf of Aden. It dwells at a depth range of 230–1040 metres.
