= Whiptail conger =

Conservation status
- Least Concern (IUCN 3.1)

Scientific classification
- Kingdom: Animalia
- Phylum: Chordata
- Class: Actinopterygii
- Order: Anguilliformes
- Family: Congridae
- Genus: Rhynchoconger
- Species: R. gracilior

Binomial name
- Rhynchoconger gracilior (Ginsburg, 1951)

Synonyms
- Congrina gracilior Ginsburg, 1951; Hildebrandia gracilior (Ginsburg, 1951)

Species of fish

The whiptail conger (Rhynchoconger gracilior), also known as the conger eel in Cuba, is an eel in the family Congridae (conger/garden eels). It was described by Isaac Ginsburg in 1951, originally under the genus Congrina. It is a marine, deep water-dwelling eel which is known from the western Atlantic Ocean, including the United States in the northern Gulf of Mexico and northern South America. It is known to dwell at a depth of 203 meters (666 ft). Males can reach a maximum total length of 61 centimeters (24 in).
