= Rhynchoconger smithi =

Scientific classification
- Domain: Eukaryota
- Kingdom: Animalia
- Phylum: Chordata
- Class: Actinopterygii
- Order: Anguilliformes
- Family: Congridae
- Genus: Rhynchoconger
- Species: R. smithi

Binomial name
- Rhynchoconger smithi Mohapatra, Ho, Acharya, Ray & Mishra, 2022

Species of fish

Rhynchoconger smithi is an eel in the family Congridae (conger/garden eels).

== Etymology ==
The eel is named in honor of the "renowned" American ichthyologist David G. Smith, of the National Museum of Natural History, Smithsonian Institution in Washington, D.C., for his contribution to eel systematics.
