= Bathycongrus bertini =

Conservation status
- Least Concern (IUCN 3.1)

Scientific classification
- Kingdom: Animalia
- Phylum: Chordata
- Class: Actinopterygii
- Order: Anguilliformes
- Family: Congridae
- Genus: Bathycongrus
- Species: B. bertini

Binomial name
- Bathycongrus bertini (Poll, 1953)

Synonyms
- Congermuraena bertini Poll, 1953; Rhechias bertini (Poll, 1953)

Species of fish

Bathycongrus bertini is an eel in the family Congridae (conger/garden eels). It was described by Max Poll in 1953, originally under the genus Congermuraena. It is a marine, deep water-dwelling eel which is known from Mauritania to Angola, in the eastern Atlantic Ocean. It dwells at a depth range of 200–400 metres. Males can reach a maximum total length of 39 centimetres.
