= Acromycter longipectoralis =

Conservation status
- Data Deficient (IUCN 3.1)

Scientific classification
- Kingdom: Animalia
- Phylum: Chordata
- Class: Actinopterygii
- Order: Anguilliformes
- Family: Congridae
- Genus: Acromycter
- Species: A. longipectoralis

Binomial name
- Acromycter longipectoralis Karmovskaya, 2004

Species of fish

Acromycter longipectoralis is an eel in the family Congridae (conger/garden eels). It was described by Emma Stanislavovna Karmovskaya in 2004. It is a marine, deep water-dwelling eel which is known from New Caledonia, in the western Pacific Ocean. It is known to dwell at a depth of 580 metres. Females can reach a total length of 21.7 centimetres.

The species epithet refers to the characteristic long pectoral fins of the species.
