= Blackspot conger =

Conservation status
- Data Deficient (IUCN 3.1)

Scientific classification
- Kingdom: Animalia
- Phylum: Chordata
- Class: Actinopterygii
- Order: Anguilliformes
- Family: Congridae
- Genus: Paraconger
- Species: P. macrops

Binomial name
- Paraconger macrops (Günther, 1870)

Synonyms
- Conger macrops Günther, 1870

Species of fish

The blackspot conger (Paraconger macrops) is an eel in the family Congridae (conger/garden eels). It was described by Albert Günther in 1870, originally under the genus Conger. It is a subtropical, marine eel which is known from the eastern Atlantic Ocean, including Madeira and Azores. It dwells at a depth range of 30–100 meters and burrows into sand. Males can reach a maximum total length of 50 centimetres.
