= Japonoconger sivicolus =

Scientific classification
- Domain: Eukaryota
- Kingdom: Animalia
- Phylum: Chordata
- Class: Actinopterygii
- Order: Anguilliformes
- Family: Congridae
- Genus: Japonoconger
- Species: J. sivicolus

Binomial name
- Japonoconger sivicolus (Matsubara & Ochiai, 1951)

Synonyms
- Arisoma sivicola Matsubara & Ochiai, 1951

Species of eel

Japonoconger sivicolus is an eel in the family Congridae (conger/garden eels). It was described by Kiyomatsu Matsubara and Akira Ochiai in 1951, originally under the genus Arisoma. It is a marine, deep water-dwelling eel which is known from Japan, in the northwestern Pacific Ocean. It dwells at a depth range of 300–535 metres. Males can reach a maximum total length of 57 centimetres.
