= Bathycongrus unimaculatus =

Conservation status
- Data Deficient (IUCN 3.1)

Scientific classification
- Kingdom: Animalia
- Phylum: Chordata
- Class: Actinopterygii
- Order: Anguilliformes
- Family: Congridae
- Genus: Bathycongrus
- Species: B. unimaculatus

Binomial name
- Bathycongrus unimaculatus Karmovskaya, 2009

Species of fish

Bathycongrus unimaculatus is an eel in the family Congridae (conger/garden eels). It was described by Emma Stanislavovna Karmovskaya in 2009. It is a tropical, marine eel which is known from the southern Loyalty Basin in New Caledonia. It usually dwells at a depth range of 430–450 metres. Males can reach a maximum total length of 28.3 centimetres.

The species epithet "unimaculatus" means "one spot" in Latin, and refers to a large dark spot on the anal fin of the eel.
