= Bullish conger =

Conservation status
- Least Concern (IUCN 3.1)

Scientific classification
- Kingdom: Animalia
- Phylum: Chordata
- Class: Actinopterygii
- Order: Anguilliformes
- Family: Congridae
- Genus: Bathycongrus
- Species: B. bullisi

Binomial name
- Bathycongrus bullisi (D. G. Smith & Kanazawa, 1977)

Synonyms
- Rhechias bullisi Smith & Kanazawa, 1977

Species of fish

The Bullish conger (Bathycongrus bullisi) is an eel in the family Congridae (conger/garden eels). It was described by David G. Smith and Robert H. Kanazawa in 1977, originally under the genus Rhechias. It is a marine, deep water-dwelling eel which is known from the Gulf of Mexico to the Amazon, in the western Atlantic Ocean. It dwells at a depth range of 366–475 meters. Males can reach a maximum total length of 39.5 centimeters.

== Etymology ==
The eel was named in honor of marine biologist Harvey R. Bullis, Jr. (1924-1992), of the National Marine Fisheries Service.
