= Parabathymyrus fijiensis =

Conservation status
- Least Concern (IUCN 3.1)

Scientific classification
- Kingdom: Animalia
- Phylum: Chordata
- Class: Actinopterygii
- Order: Anguilliformes
- Family: Congridae
- Genus: Parabathymyrus
- Species: P. fijiensis

Binomial name
- Parabathymyrus fijiensis Karmovskaya, 2004

Species of fish

Parabathymyrus fijiensis is an eel in the family Congridae (conger/garden eels). It was described by Emma Stanislavovna Karmovskaya in 2004. It is a marine, deep water-dwelling eel which is known from Fiji (from which its species epithet is derived), in the western Pacific Ocean. It dwells at a depth range of 478–500 metres. Females can reach a total length of 36 centimetres.
