= Toothy conger =

Conservation status
- Least Concern (IUCN 3.1)

Scientific classification
- Kingdom: Animalia
- Phylum: Chordata
- Class: Actinopterygii
- Order: Anguilliformes
- Family: Congridae
- Genus: Bathycongrus
- Species: B. odontostomus

Binomial name
- Bathycongrus odontostomus (Fowler, 1934)

Synonyms
- Uranoconger odontostomus Fowler, 1934

Species of fish

The Toothy conger (Bathycongrus odontostomus) is an eel in the family Congridae (conger/garden eels). It was described by Henry Weed Fowler in 1934, originally under the genus Uranoconger. It is a marine, deep water-dwelling eel which is known from the western Indian and southwestern Pacific Ocean, including the Philippines and Indonesia. It is known to dwell at a depth of 886 metres. Males can reach a maximum total length of 4.3 centimetres.
