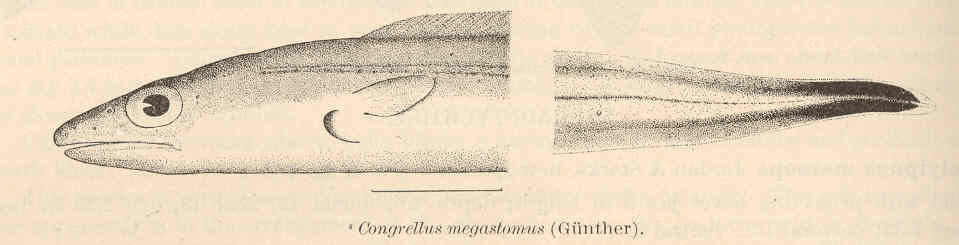

Conservation status
- Least Concern (IUCN 3.1)

Scientific classification
- Kingdom: Animalia
- Phylum: Chordata
- Class: Actinopterygii
- Order: Anguilliformes
- Family: Congridae
- Genus: Congriscus
- Species: C. megastomus

Binomial name
- Congriscus megastomus (Günther, 1877)

Synonyms
- Congromuraena megastoma Günther, 1877; Thalassenchelys coheni Castle & Raju, 1975

= Congriscus megastomus =

Species of eel

Congriscus megastomus is an eel in the family Congridae (conger/garden eels). It was described by Albert Günther in 1877, originally under the genus Congromuraena. It is a marine, temperate-water dwelling eel which is known from Japan and the Kyushu–Palau Ridge, in the northwestern Pacific Ocean. It inhabits reefs. Males can reach a maximum total length of 40 centimeters. This species' remarkably large and distinct leptocephalus larvae were previously known under the name Thalassenchelys coheni. In 2016, scientists used genetic techniques to link the larvae to the adult C. megastomus. These larvae reach a maximum size of 30 cm (12 in) and have a number of unusual characteristics, including two forward-facing front teeth that may be used for feeding on different prey than other eel larvae.

Congriscus megastomus is preyed on by Chlorophthalmus albatrossis. Its own diet includes finfish such as Diaphus coeruleus, Diaphus sagamiensis, Hymenocephalus lethonemus, Synagrops japonicus, and species of Macrura, as well as euphausiid plankton crustaceans and polychaetes.
