= Japonoconger africanus =

Scientific classification
- Kingdom: Animalia
- Phylum: Chordata
- Class: Actinopterygii
- Order: Anguilliformes
- Family: Congridae
- Genus: Japonoconger
- Species: J. africanus

Binomial name
- Japonoconger africanus (Poll, 1953)

Synonyms
- Congermuraena africana Poll, 1953

Species of fish

Japonoconger africanus is an eel in the family Congridae (conger/garden eels). It was described by Max Poll in 1953, originally under the genus Congermuraena. It is a marine, deep water-dwelling eel which is known from Gabon to the Congo, in the eastern Atlantic Ocean. It dwells at a depth range of 250–650 metres. Males can reach a maximum total length of 42.5 centimetres.

The diet of Japanoconger africanus consists of bony fish, crabs, shrimp and prawns.
