= Threadtail conger =

Scientific classification
- Kingdom: Animalia
- Phylum: Chordata
- Class: Actinopterygii
- Order: Anguilliformes
- Family: Congridae
- Genus: Uroconger
- Species: U. syringinus

Binomial name
- Uroconger syringinus Ginsburg, 1954

Species of fish

The threadtail conger (Uroconger syringinus, also known as the slender-tail conger) is an eel in the family Congridae (conger/garden eels). It was described by Isaac Ginsburg in 1954. It is a marine, subtropical eel which is known from the eastern and western Atlantic Ocean, including the Gulf of Guinea, the Gulf of Mexico and Suriname. It is known to dwell at a depth range of 44 to 384 meters (144 to 1,260 ft). Males can reach a maximum total length of 38 centimeters (15 in).
