= Rhynchoconger guppyi =

Conservation status
- Least Concern (IUCN 3.1)

Scientific classification
- Kingdom: Animalia
- Phylum: Chordata
- Class: Actinopterygii
- Order: Anguilliformes
- Family: Congridae
- Genus: Rhynchoconger
- Species: R. guppyi

Binomial name
- Rhynchoconger guppyi (Norman, 1925)

Synonyms
- Congromuraena guppyi Norman, 1925; Hildebrandia guppyi (Norman, 1925)

Species of fish

Rhynchoconger guppyi is an eel in the family Congridae (conger/garden eels). It was described by John Roxborough Norman in 1925, originally under the genus Congromuraena. It is a marine, tropical eel which is known from the western central Atlantic Ocean, including the Gulf of Mexico, the Caribbean, northern South America and southern Brazil. It dwells at a depth range of 137 to 458 metres (449 to 1,503 ft), and inhabits the continental slope. Males can reach a maximum total length of 95 centimetres (37 in).

== Etymology ==
The eel is named in honor of naturalist Plantagenet Lechmere Guppy (1871–1934), the son of the civil engineer who discovered the Guppy, Poecilia reticulata, and who collected the holotype and sent it to the British Museum.
