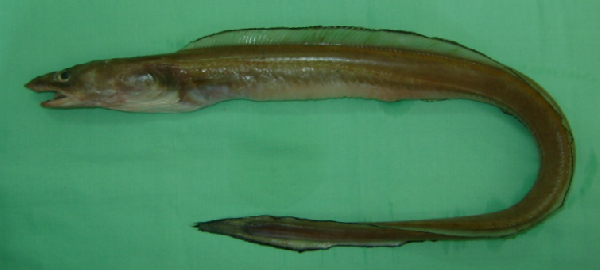

Conservation status
- Least Concern (IUCN 3.1)

Scientific classification
- Kingdom: Animalia
- Phylum: Chordata
- Class: Actinopterygii
- Order: Anguilliformes
- Family: Congridae
- Genus: Rhynchoconger
- Species: R. trewavasae

Binomial name
- Rhynchoconger trewavasae Ben-Tuvia, 1993

= Rhynchoconger trewavasae =

Species of fish

Rhynchoconger trewavasae is an eel in the family Congridae (conger/garden eels). It was described by Adam Ben-Tuvia in 1993. It is a marine, deep water-dwelling eel which is known from the western Indian Ocean, including the Gulf of Aqaba and possibly the Gulf of Suez. A single specimen was recorded in the Mediterranean Sea from Israel in 1993. It dwells at a depth range of 300 to 500 metres (980 to 1,640 ft), and swims in a zigzag motion near the bottom. Males can reach a maximum total length of 57 centimetres (22 in), but more commonly reach a TL of 45 centimetres (18 in).

== Etymology ==
The species epithet "trewavasae" was given in honour of British ichthyologist Ethelwynn Trewavas.

R. trewavasae is sometimes caught in traps and trammel nets.
