= Bathyuroconger parvibranchialis =

Conservation status
- Least Concern (IUCN 3.1)

Scientific classification
- Kingdom: Animalia
- Phylum: Chordata
- Class: Actinopterygii
- Order: Anguilliformes
- Family: Congridae
- Genus: Bathyuroconger
- Species: B. parvibranchialis

Binomial name
- Bathyuroconger parvibranchialis (Fowler, 1934)

Synonyms
- Silvesterina parvibranchialis Fowler, 1934

Species of fish

Bathyuroconger parvibranchialis is an eel in the family Congridae (conger/garden eels). It was described by Henry Weed Fowler in 1934, originally under the genus Silvesterina. It is a marine, deep water-dwelling eel which is known from the western central Pacific Ocean. It is known to dwell at a depth of 1023 metres.
