= Xenomystax atrarius =

Conservation status
- Least Concern (IUCN 3.1)

Scientific classification
- Kingdom: Animalia
- Phylum: Chordata
- Class: Actinopterygii
- Order: Anguilliformes
- Family: Congridae
- Genus: Xenomystax
- Species: X. atrarius

Binomial name
- Xenomystax atrarius Gilbert, 1891

Species of fish

Xenomystax atrarius, the deepwater conger or twinpored eel, is an eel in the family Congridae (conger/garden eels). It was described by Charles Henry Gilbert in 1891. It is a marine, deep water-dwelling eel which is known from southern Canada to Chile, in the eastern Pacific Ocean. It dwells at a depth range of 152–1,050 metres (499–3,445 ft). Males can reach a maximum total length of 100 centimetres (39 in).
