= Dubious conger =

Scientific classification
- Kingdom: Animalia
- Phylum: Chordata
- Class: Actinopterygii
- Division: Teleostei
- Order: Anguilliformes
- Family: Congridae
- Genus: Bathycongrus
- Species: B. dubius

Binomial name
- Bathycongrus dubius (Breder, 1927)

Synonyms
- Pseudoxenomystax dubius Breder, 1927

Species of fish

The dubious conger (Bathycongrus dubius) is an eel in the family Congridae (conger/garden eels). It was described by Charles Marcus Breder Jr. in 1927, originally under the genus Pseudoxenomystax. It is a marine, deep water-dwelling eel which is known from the western Atlantic Ocean, including the United States, the Gulf of Mexico, Caribbean Sea, and the Guianas. It dwells at a depth range of 128–886 meters. Males can reach a maximum total length of 44.3 centimetres (1.45 ft) centimeters.
