= Chiloconger philippinensis =

Conservation status
- Least Concern (IUCN 3.1)

Scientific classification
- Kingdom: Animalia
- Phylum: Chordata
- Class: Actinopterygii
- Order: Anguilliformes
- Family: Congridae
- Genus: Chiloconger
- Species: C. philippinensis

Binomial name
- Chiloconger philippinensis Smith & Karmovskaya, 2003

Species of fish

Chiloconger philippinensis is an eel in the family Congridae (conger/garden eels). It was described by David G. Smith and Emma Stanislavovna Karmovskaya in 2003. It is a tropical, marine eel which is known from the Philippines (from which its species epithet is derived), in the western central Pacific Ocean. It dwells at a depth range of 186–230 metres. Females can reach a total length of 19 centimetres.
