= Bathycongrus bleekeri =

Conservation status
- Data Deficient (IUCN 3.1)

Scientific classification
- Kingdom: Animalia
- Phylum: Chordata
- Class: Actinopterygii
- Order: Anguilliformes
- Family: Congridae
- Genus: Bathycongrus
- Species: B. bleekeri

Binomial name
- Bathycongrus bleekeri Fowler, 1934

Synonyms
- Ariosoma bleekeri (Fowler, 1934)

Species of fish

Bathycongrus bleekeri is an eel in the family Congridae (conger/garden eels). It was described by Henry Weed Fowler in 1934. It is a tropical, marine eel which is known from the Philippines, in the western central Pacific Ocean. It is known to dwell at a depth of 51 metres. Males can reach a maximum total length of 8 centimetres.
