= Rhynchoconger bicoloratus =

Scientific classification
- Domain: Eukaryota
- Kingdom: Animalia
- Phylum: Chordata
- Class: Actinopterygii
- Order: Anguilliformes
- Family: Congridae
- Genus: Rhynchoconger
- Species: R. bicoloratus

Binomial name
- Rhynchoconger bicoloratus Kodeeswaran, Mohapatra, Kumar & Lal, 2023

Species of eel

Rhynchoconger bicoloratus is a species of deep-water conger eel native to the Indian Ocean. It was described through specimens captured in Kalamukku fishing harbor, off Kochi, Arabian Sea, from a depth beyond 200 m.
