= Guinean conger =

Conservation status
- Least Concern (IUCN 3.1)

Scientific classification
- Kingdom: Animalia
- Phylum: Chordata
- Class: Actinopterygii
- Order: Anguilliformes
- Family: Congridae
- Genus: Paraconger
- Species: P. notialis

Binomial name
- Paraconger notialis Kanazawa, 1961

Species of fish

The Guinean conger (Paraconger notialis) is an eel in the family Congridae (conger/garden eels). It was described by Robert H. Kanazawa in 1961. It is a tropical, marine eel which is known from Senegal to Angola, in the eastern Atlantic Ocean. It dwells at a depth range of 25–50 metres, and inhabits benthic sand, which it burrows into backwards. Males can reach a maximum total length of 62.7 centimetres.
