= Uroconger erythraeus =

Scientific classification
- Kingdom: Animalia
- Phylum: Chordata
- Class: Actinopterygii
- Order: Anguilliformes
- Family: Congridae
- Genus: Uroconger
- Species: U. erythraeus

Binomial name
- Uroconger erythraeus Castle, 1982

Species of fish

Uroconger erythraeus is an eel in the family Congridae (conger/garden eels). It was described by Peter Henry John Castle in 1982. It is a marine, deep water-dwelling eel which is known from the Red Sea, in the western Indian Ocean. It is known to dwell at a depth range of 820 to 1,550 metres (2,690 to 5,090 ft).
