= Promyllantor atlanticus =

Scientific classification
- Kingdom: Animalia
- Phylum: Chordata
- Class: Actinopterygii
- Order: Anguilliformes
- Family: Congridae
- Genus: Promyllantor
- Species: P. atlanticus

Binomial name
- Promyllantor atlanticus Karmovskaya, 2006

Species of fish

Promyllantor atlanticus is an eel in the family Congridae (conger/garden eels). It was described by Emma Stanislavovna Karmovskaya in 2006. It is a marine, deep water-dwelling eel which is known from the Republic of Congo, in the southeastern Atlantic Ocean (from which its species epithet is derived). It is known to dwell at a depth of 495 metres (1,624 ft). Males can reach a maximum total length of 51.8 centimetres (20.4 in), while females can reach a maximum TL of 48.5 centimetres (19.1 in).
