= Parabathymyrus macrophthalmus =

Conservation status
- Least Concern (IUCN 3.1)

Scientific classification
- Kingdom: Animalia
- Phylum: Chordata
- Class: Actinopterygii
- Order: Anguilliformes
- Family: Congridae
- Genus: Parabathymyrus
- Species: P. macrophthalmus

Binomial name
- Parabathymyrus macrophthalmus Kamohara, 1938

Species of fish

Parabathymyrus macrophthalmus is an eel in the family Congridae (conger/garden eels). It was described by Toshiji Kamohara in 1938. It is a tropical, marine eel which is known from the Indo-West Pacific, including Japan, Taiwan, the South China Sea, and Indonesia. Males can reach a maximum total length of 47 centimetres.
