= Paraconger guianensis =

Conservation status
- Least Concern (IUCN 3.1)

Scientific classification
- Kingdom: Animalia
- Phylum: Chordata
- Class: Actinopterygii
- Order: Anguilliformes
- Family: Congridae
- Genus: Paraconger
- Species: P. guianensis

Binomial name
- Paraconger guianensis Kanazawa, 1961

Species of fish

Paraconger guianensis is an eel in the family Congridae (conger/garden eels). It was described by Robert H. Kanazawa in 1961. It is a tropical, marine eel which is known from French Guiana and northern Brazil, in the western Atlantic Ocean. It is known to dwell at a depth of 73 metres.
