= Japonoconger caribbeus =

Scientific classification
- Domain: Eukaryota
- Kingdom: Animalia
- Phylum: Chordata
- Class: Actinopterygii
- Order: Anguilliformes
- Family: Congridae
- Genus: Japonoconger
- Species: J. caribbeus

Binomial name
- Japonoconger caribbeus D. G. Smith & Kanazawa, 1977

Species of fish

Japonoconger caribbeus is an eel in the family Congridae (conger/garden eels). It was described by David G. Smith and Robert H. Kanazawa in 1977. It is a marine, deep water-dwelling eel which is known only from the Caribbean Sea (off the coast of Colombia and Venezuela, from which its species epithet is derived), in the western central Atlantic Ocean. It dwells at a depth range of 329–576 m (1,079–1,890 ft). Males can reach a maximum total length of 50.2 cm (19.8 in).
