= Xenomystax bidentatus =

Scientific classification
- Kingdom: Animalia
- Phylum: Chordata
- Class: Actinopterygii
- Division: Teleostei
- Order: Anguilliformes
- Family: Congridae
- Genus: Xenomystax
- Species: X. bidentatus

Binomial name
- Xenomystax bidentatus (Reid, 1940)

Synonyms
- Paraxenomystax bidentatus Reid, 1940

Species of fish

Xenomystax bidentatus is an eel in the family Congridae (conger/garden eels). It was described by Earl Desmond Reid in 1940. It is a marine, tropical eel which is known from northern South America, in the western central Atlantic Ocean. It is known to dwell at a depth range of 494 to 604 meters (1,621 to 1,982 ft).
