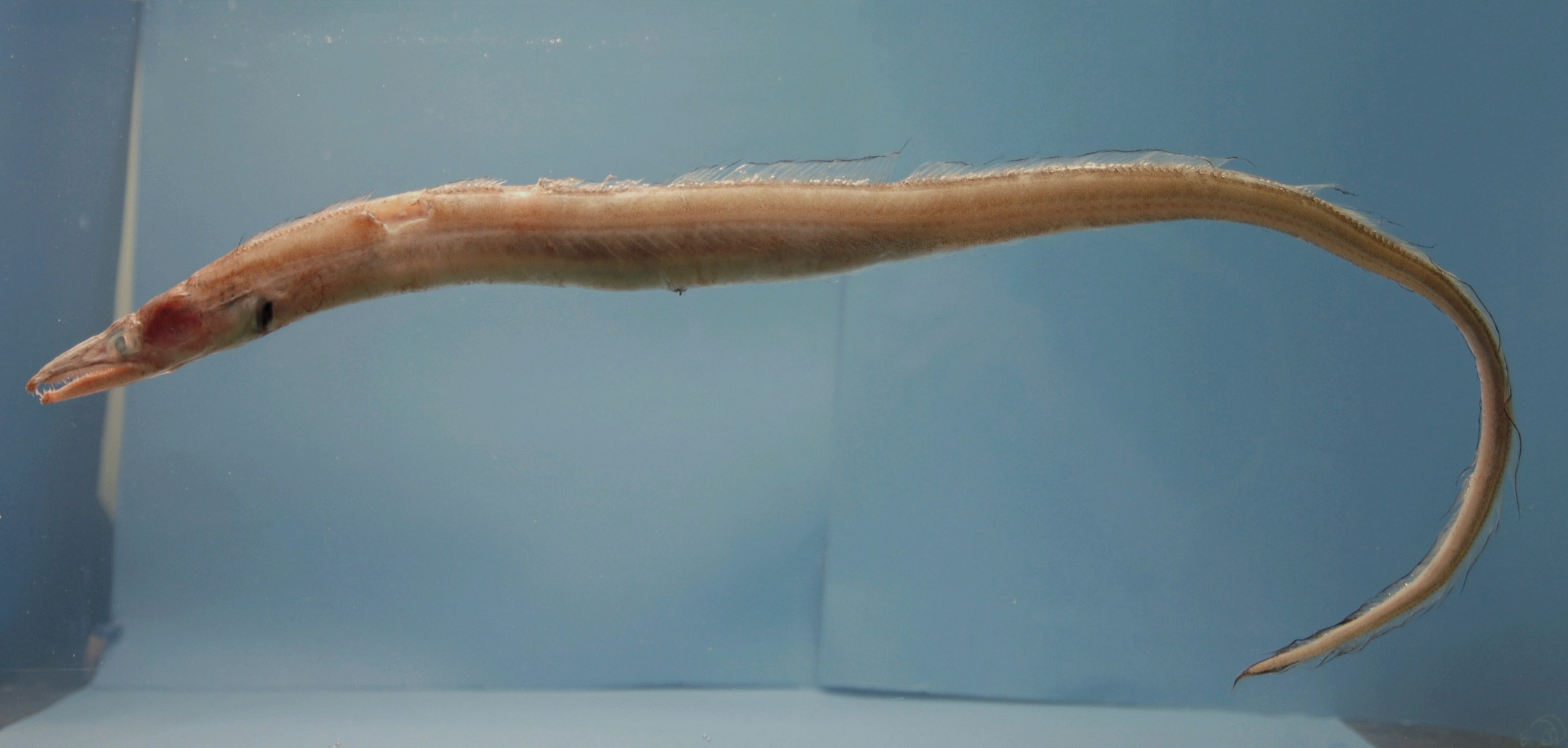

Conservation status
- Least Concern (IUCN 3.1)

Scientific classification
- Kingdom: Animalia
- Phylum: Chordata
- Class: Actinopterygii
- Order: Anguilliformes
- Family: Congridae
- Genus: Xenomystax
- Species: X. congroides

Binomial name
- Xenomystax congroides D. G. Smith & Kanazawa, 1989

= Bristletooth conger =

Species of fish

The bristletooth conger (Xenomystax congroides) is an eel in the family Congridae (conger/garden eels). It was described by David G. Smith and Robert H. Kanazawa in 1989. It is a marine, deep water–dwelling eel which is known from the western Atlantic Ocean, including northeastern Florida, U.S.A.; the Gulf of Mexico, the Amazon River, the Bahamas and the West Indies. It dwells at a depth range of 140–825 metres (459–2,707 ft). Males can reach a maximum total length of 87.6 centimetres (34.5 in).
