= Paraconger ophichthys =

Scientific classification
- Kingdom: Animalia
- Phylum: Chordata
- Class: Actinopterygii
- Order: Anguilliformes
- Family: Congridae
- Genus: Paraconger
- Species: P. ophichthys

Binomial name
- Paraconger ophichthys (Garman, 1899)

Synonyms
- Atopichthys ophichthys Garman, 1899

Species of fish

Paraconger ophichthys is an eel in the family Congridae (conger/garden eels). It was described by Samuel Garman in 1899, originally under the genus Atopichthys. It is a tropical, marine eel which is known from Cocos Island, in the eastern central Pacific Ocean. It is known to dwell at a depth of 1953 metres.
