= Promyllantor purpureus =

Scientific classification
- Kingdom: Animalia
- Phylum: Chordata
- Class: Actinopterygii
- Order: Anguilliformes
- Family: Congridae
- Genus: Promyllantor
- Species: P. purpureus

Binomial name
- Promyllantor purpureus Alcock, 1890

Synonyms
- Ariosoma purpureus (Alcock, 1890)

Species of fish

Promyllantor purpureus is an eel in the family Congridae (conger/garden eels). It was described by Alfred William Alcock in 1890. It is a marine, deep water-dwelling eel which is known from the Indo-Western Pacific, including India and Indonesia. It is known to dwell at a depth range of 1,120 to 2,250 metres (3,670 to 7,380 ft).
