= Shortsnout conger =

Conservation status
- Least Concern (IUCN 3.1)

Scientific classification
- Kingdom: Animalia
- Phylum: Chordata
- Class: Actinopterygii
- Order: Anguilliformes
- Family: Congridae
- Genus: Chiloconger
- Species: C. dentatus

Binomial name
- Chiloconger dentatus (Garman, 1899)

Synonyms
- Atopichthys dentatus (Garman, 1899); Paraconger dentatus (Garman, 1899); Atopichthys obtusus (Garman, 1899); Chiloconger obtusus (Garman, 1899); Gorgasia obtusa (Garman, 1899); Chiloconger labiatus (Myers & Wade, 1941)

Species of fish

The shortsnout conger (Chiloconger dentatus), also known as the thicklip conger, is an eel in the family Congridae (conger/garden eels). It was described by Samuel Garman in 1899, originally under the genus Atopichthys. It is a tropical, marine eel which is known from the eastern central Pacific Ocean, including Colombia, Costa Rica, Ecuador, El Salvador, Guatemala, Honduras, Mexico, Nicaragua, and Panama. It leads a reclusive, benthic, burrowing lifestyle, and typically dwells at a depth range of 27–2198 metres. Males can reach a maximum total length of 30 centimetres.

Due to its widespread distribution, lack of known threats, and lack of observed population declines, the IUCN redlist currently lists the Shortsnout conger at Least Concern.
