= Macrocephenchelys brachialis =

Scientific classification
- Kingdom: Animalia
- Phylum: Chordata
- Class: Actinopterygii
- Order: Anguilliformes
- Family: Congridae
- Genus: Macrocephenchelys
- Species: M. brachialis

Binomial name
- Macrocephenchelys brachialis Fowler, 1934

Species of fish

Macrocephenchelys brachialis is an eel in the family Congridae (conger/garden eels). It was described by Henry Weed Fowler in 1934. It is a marine, deep water-dwelling eel which is known from two specimens collected in the Macassar Strait, in the western central Pacific Ocean. It is known to dwell at a depth of 672 metres (2,205 ft). Males can reach a total length of 50 centimetres (20 in).
