= Acromycter perturbator =

Conservation status
- Least Concern (IUCN 3.1)

Scientific classification
- Kingdom: Animalia
- Phylum: Chordata
- Class: Actinopterygii
- Order: Anguilliformes
- Family: Congridae
- Genus: Acromycter
- Species: A. perturbator

Binomial name
- Acromycter perturbator (A. E. Parr, 1932)

Synonyms
- Ariosoma perturbator A. E. Parr, 1932

Species of fish

Acromycter perturbator is an eel in the family Congridae (conger/garden eels). It was described by Albert Eide Parr in 1932, originally under the genus Ariosoma. It is a marine, deep water-dwelling eel which is known from the northwestern and western central Atlantic Ocean, including the Bahamas, the United States, and Jamaica. It dwells at a depth range of 1299–1318 metres.

Due to its wide distribution, lack of perceived threats, and estimated population stability, the IUCN redlist currently lists Acromycter perturbator as Least Concern.
