= Rhynchoconger squaliceps =

Conservation status
- Data Deficient (IUCN 3.1)

Scientific classification
- Kingdom: Animalia
- Phylum: Chordata
- Class: Actinopterygii
- Order: Anguilliformes
- Family: Congridae
- Genus: Rhynchoconger
- Species: R. squaliceps

Binomial name
- Rhynchoconger squaliceps (Alcock, 1894)

Synonyms
- Congromuraena squaliceps Alcock, 1894; Bathycongrus squaliceps (Alcock, 1894)

Species of fish

Rhynchoconger squaliceps is an eel in the family Congridae (conger/garden eels). It was described by Alfred William Alcock in 1894, originally under the genus Congromuraena. It is a marine, tropical eel which is known from the Bay of Bengal, in the western Indian Ocean. It is known to dwell at a depth of 234 metres (768 ft).
