= Bassanago nielseni =

Conservation status
- Data Deficient (IUCN 3.1)

Scientific classification
- Kingdom: Animalia
- Phylum: Chordata
- Class: Actinopterygii
- Order: Anguilliformes
- Family: Congridae
- Genus: Bassanago
- Species: B. nielseni

Binomial name
- Bassanago nielseni (Karmovskaya, 1990)

Synonyms
- Pseudoxenomystax nielseni Karmovskaya, 1990

Species of fish

Bassanago nielseni is an eel in the family Congridae (conger/garden eels). It was described by Emma Stanislavovna Karmovskaya in 1990, originally under the genus Pseudoxenomystax. It is a marine, deep-water dwelling eel which is known from the central and southern part of the Nazca Ridge, in the southeastern Pacific Ocean. It dwells at a depth range of 160–340 metres. Males can reach a maximum total length of 46.5 centimetres.

The species epithet was given in honour of Jorgen Nielsen, a specialist in the study of deep-sea fish.
