= Xenomystax trucidans =

Scientific classification
- Kingdom: Animalia
- Phylum: Chordata
- Class: Actinopterygii
- Division: Teleostei
- Order: Anguilliformes
- Family: Congridae
- Genus: Xenomystax
- Species: X. trucidans

Binomial name
- Xenomystax trucidans Alcock, 1894

Species of fish

Xenomystax trucidans is an eel in the family Congridae (conger/garden eels). It was described by Alfred William Alcock in 1894. It is a marine, deep water-dwelling eel which is known from Maldives and Laccadives, in the western Indian Ocean. It is known to dwell at a depth of 1,316 metres (4,318 ft), but is more commonly found at a depth range of 400 to 800 metres (1,300 to 2,600 ft). Males can reach a maximum total length of 64.5 centimetres (25.4 in).

Due to the limited number of specimens from which the species is known, the IUCN redlist currently lists X. trucidans as Data Deficient.
