= Flapnose conger =

Conservation status
- Least Concern (IUCN 3.1)

Scientific classification
- Kingdom: Animalia
- Phylum: Chordata
- Class: Actinopterygii
- Order: Anguilliformes
- Family: Congridae
- Genus: Parabathymyrus
- Species: P. oregoni

Binomial name
- Parabathymyrus oregoni D. G. Smith & Kanazawa, 1977

Species of fish

The flapnose conger (Parabathymyrus oregoni) is an eel in the family Congridae (conger/garden eels). It was described by David G. Smith and Robert H. Kanazawa in 1977. It is a tropical, marine eel which is known from French Guiana, in the western central Atlantic Ocean. It is known to dwell at a depth of 210 metres.
