= Bathycongrus parviporus =

Conservation status
- Data Deficient (IUCN 3.1)

Scientific classification
- Kingdom: Animalia
- Phylum: Chordata
- Class: Actinopterygii
- Order: Anguilliformes
- Family: Congridae
- Genus: Bathycongrus
- Species: B. parviporus

Binomial name
- Bathycongrus parviporus Karmovskaya, 2011

Species of fish

Bathycongrus parviporus is an eel in the family Congridae (conger/garden eels). It was described by Emma Stanislavovna Karmovskaya in 2011. It is a tropical, marine eel which is known from the South China Sea and central Vietnam.
