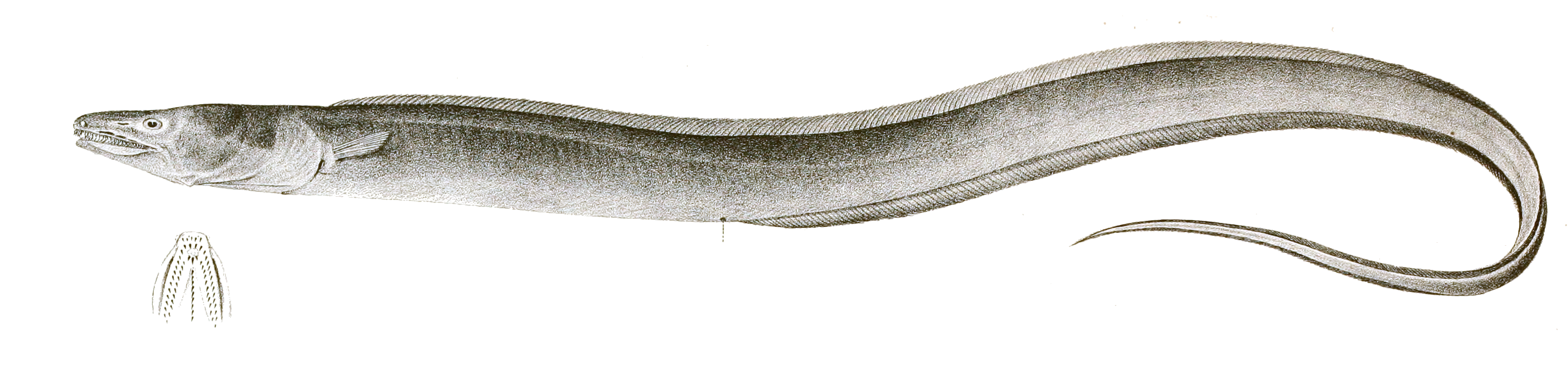

Scientific classification
- Domain: Eukaryota
- Kingdom: Animalia
- Phylum: Chordata
- Class: Actinopterygii
- Order: Anguilliformes
- Family: Congridae
- Genus: Uroconger
- Species: U. lepturus

Binomial name
- Uroconger lepturus (Richardson, 1845)

Synonyms
- Congrus lepturus Richardson, 1845; Conger lepturus (Richardson, 1845)

= Slender conger =

Species of fish

The slender conger (Uroconger lepturus, also known as the longtail conger or the yellow pike-conger) is an eel in the family Congridae (conger/garden eels). It was described by John Richardson in 1845, originally under the genus Congrus. It is a marine, tropical eel which is known from the Indo-Western Pacific Ocean, including the Red Sea, South Africa, and Japan. It dwells at a depth range of 18 to 760 metres (59 to 2,493 ft), and inhabits sand and mud. Males can reach a maximum total length of 52 centimetres (20 in), but more commonly reach a TL of 30 centimetres (12 in).

The slender conger's diet consists of small benthic crustaceans. It is of commercial interest to fisheries.
