= Swollen-headed conger eel =

- Drawing by Dr Tony Ayling

Conservation status
- Least Concern (IUCN 3.1)

Scientific classification
- Kingdom: Animalia
- Phylum: Chordata
- Class: Actinopterygii
- Order: Anguilliformes
- Family: Congridae
- Genus: Bassanago
- Species: B. bulbiceps

Binomial name
- Bassanago bulbiceps Whitley, 1948

Species of fish

The swollen-headed conger eel, Bassanago bulbiceps, is a conger of the family Congridae, found on continental slopes around southern Australia and New Zealand. Its length is between 40 and 60 cm.
