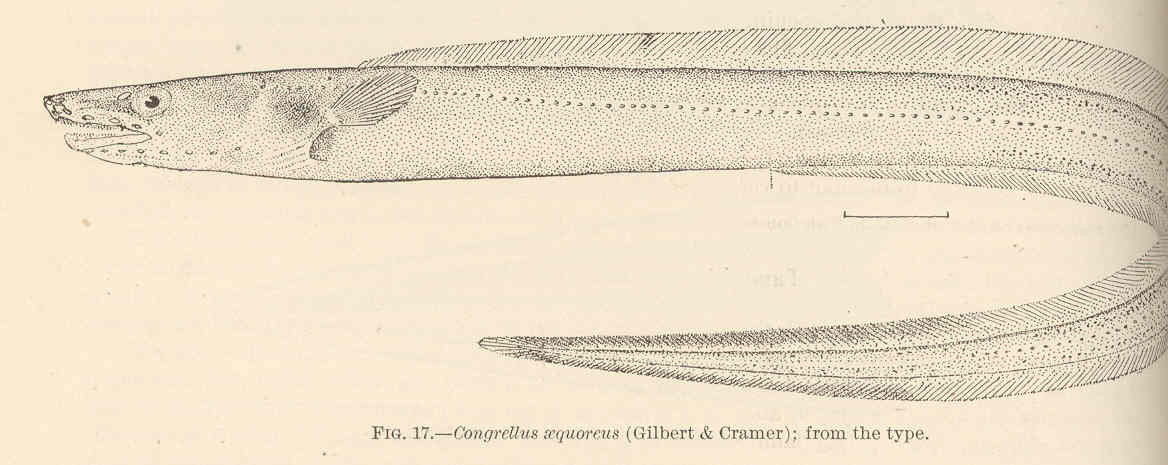

Conservation status
- Least Concern (IUCN 3.1)

Scientific classification
- Kingdom: Animalia
- Phylum: Chordata
- Class: Actinopterygii
- Order: Anguilliformes
- Family: Congridae
- Genus: Bathycongrus
- Species: B. aequoreus

Binomial name
- Bathycongrus aequoreus (C. H. Gilbert & Cramer, 1897)

Synonyms
- Congermuraena aequorea Gilbert & Cramer, 1897; Congermuraena aequoreus Gilbert & Cramer, 1897 (misspelling); Rhechias armiger Jordan, 1921

= Bathycongrus aequoreus =

Species of fish

Bathycongrus aequoreus is an eel in the family Congridae (conger/garden eels). It was described by Charles Henry Gilbert and Frank Cramer in 1897, originally under the genus Congermuraena. It is a marine, deep water-dwelling eel which is known from Hawaii, in the eastern central Pacific Ocean. It dwells at a depth range of 300–686 metres, prefers deeper water and leads a benthic lifestyle.

Not much is known about these creatures, although Bathycongrus aequoreus are believed to be actively mobile, based on Anguilliformes. They also are believed to have a diet of a nektobenthic carnivore, again based on Anguilliformes. In addition, their taphonomy is phosphatic, which is based on vertebrata. They are believed to be harmless to humans and although not much information is known about them, they do have paired fins, dorsal and lateral fins, and have pored lateral line scales

Overall, Anguilliformes are ray-finned fish which consists of 8 suborders, 19 families, 111 genera, and around 800 species. They tend to undergo considerable development from the early larval stage and are usually predators. There are a multitude of colors that vary in Anguilliformes, ranging in where they live. Typically, they are a darkened brown or olive-brown above, a little bit of yellow on the sides, the lower surface is paler brown/yellow, and the belly tends to be a dirty yellowish-white color

Anguilliformes also tend to range from 4 inches to 11.5 feet, and systematists have emphasized a variety of other morphological characteristics that have been useful for phylogenetic purposes, such as a lack of pelvic fins and the continuous dorsal, anal, and caudal fins. Most species tend not to have pectoral fins and also lack scales. Gill openings for Anguilliformes tend to be narrow, with the gill region elongated and the gills posteriorly placed. Overall, this order has morphological simplifications that allows an evolutionary trend in being worm-like.

In terms of feeding ecology and diet, the species of this order typically are opportunistic feeders, where they often eat any source of food that they come in contact with, whether aquatic insects to crustaceans. With this flexibility, they are able to shift toward the best food source and capturing tactics. Some species can also feed on dead animals that lie on the bottom, and therefore, this has led to some interest in the ecological role played by Anguilliformes in benthic habitats such as the Bathycongrus aequoreus. Usually, Anguilliformes are preyed upon mostly by other types of fish, and in larval form, other fish and invertebrates will prey on them. As they grow larger and mature, the size of their predators will also increase

In terms of behavior, one of the most extraordinary aspects of Anguilliform biology is their ability to migrate, despite being slower swimmers. Their method of swimming includes sinuous lateral movements of the body and medial forms. They also have an ability of other borrowing species to swim backwards, which gives Anguilliformes the ability to retreat from predators while still being able to see any potential enemies. Anguilliformes can congregate in larger numbers but tend not to school and are considered to be solitary creatures.
