= Bathycongrus longicavis =

Conservation status
- Data Deficient (IUCN 3.1)

Scientific classification
- Kingdom: Animalia
- Phylum: Chordata
- Class: Actinopterygii
- Order: Anguilliformes
- Family: Congridae
- Genus: Bathycongrus
- Species: B. longicavis

Binomial name
- Bathycongrus longicavis Karmovskaya, 2009

Species of fish

Bathycongrus longicavis is an eel in the family Congridae (conger/garden eels). It was described by Emma Stanislavovna Karmovskaya in 2009. It is a tropical, marine eel which is known from the Pacific Ocean, including Vanuatu and the New Hebrides Trench. It dwells at a depth range of 532–599 metres. Males can reach a maximum total length of 38.6 centimetres.

The species epithet refers to the long cavity on the abdomen of the species.
