= Bathycongrus thysanochilus =

Conservation status
- Least Concern (IUCN 3.1)

Scientific classification
- Kingdom: Animalia
- Phylum: Chordata
- Class: Actinopterygii
- Order: Anguilliformes
- Family: Congridae
- Genus: Bathycongrus
- Species: B. thysanochilus

Binomial name
- Bathycongrus thysanochilus (Reid, 1934)

Synonyms
- Congrina thysanochila Reid, 1934; Rhechias thysanochila (Reid, 1934)

Species of fish

The Conger eel (Bathycongrus thysanochilus) is an eel in the family Congridae (conger/garden eels). It was described by Earl Desmond Reid in 1934, originally under the genus Congrina. It is a marine, deep water-dwelling eel which is known from Cuba and Venezuela, in the western central Atlantic Ocean. It dwells at a depth range of 476–659 metres.
