= Californian conger =

Conservation status
- Least Concern (IUCN 3.1)

Scientific classification
- Kingdom: Animalia
- Phylum: Chordata
- Class: Actinopterygii
- Order: Anguilliformes
- Family: Congridae
- Genus: Paraconger
- Species: P. californiensis

Binomial name
- Paraconger californiensis Kanazawa, 1961

Species of fish

The Californian conger (Paraconger californiensis), also known as the ringeye conger, is an eel in the family Congridae (conger/garden eels). It was described by Robert H. Kanazawa. It is a tropical, marine eel which is known from the eastern central and southeastern Pacific Ocean, including Colombia, Costa Rica, Ecuador, El Salvador, Guatemala, Honduras, Mexico, Nicaragua, Panama, and Peru. It is known to dwell at a depth of 50 metres. Males reach an average total length of 40 centimetres, but can reach a maximum TL of 60 cm.

Due to its widespread distribution, lack of known threats, and lack of perceived population declines, the IUCN redlist currently lists the Californian conger as Least Concern.
