= Longnose conger =

Conservation status
- Least Concern (IUCN 3.1)

Scientific classification
- Kingdom: Animalia
- Phylum: Chordata
- Class: Actinopterygii
- Order: Anguilliformes
- Family: Congridae
- Genus: Bathycongrus
- Species: B. wallacei

Binomial name
- Bathycongrus wallacei (Castle, 1968)

Synonyms
- Congrina wallacei Castle, 1968; Rhechias wallacei (Castle, 1968); Bathycongrus baranesi Ben-Tuvia, 1993

Species of fish

The Longnose conger (Bathycongrus wallacei) is an eel in the family Congridae (conger/garden eels). It was described by Peter Henry John Castle in 1968, originally under the genus Congrina. It is a marine, deep water-dwelling eel which is known from the Indo-Western Pacific, including Mozambique, Natal, South Africa, Japan, the Philippines, and Indonesia. It dwells at a depth range of 250–500 metres. Males can reach a maximum total length of 55 centimetres.
