= Blachea longicaudalis =

Conservation status
- Least Concern (IUCN 3.1)

Scientific classification
- Kingdom: Animalia
- Phylum: Chordata
- Class: Actinopterygii
- Order: Anguilliformes
- Family: Congridae
- Genus: Blachea
- Species: B. longicaudalis

Binomial name
- Blachea longicaudalis Karmovskaya, 2004

Species of fish

Blachea longicaudalis is an eel in the family Congridae (conger/garden eels). It was described by Emma Stanislavovna Karmovskaya in 2004. It is a marine, deep water-dwelling eel which is known from Fiji and New Caledonia, in the western Pacific Ocean. It dwells at a depth range of 400–461 metres. Males can reach a maximum total length of 68.3 centimetres, while females can reach a maximum TL of 57 cm.

The species epithet "longicaudalis" refers to the eel's elongated caudal fins.
