= Acromycter atlanticus =

Conservation status
- Least Concern (IUCN 3.1)

Scientific classification
- Kingdom: Animalia
- Phylum: Chordata
- Class: Actinopterygii
- Order: Anguilliformes
- Family: Congridae
- Genus: Acromycter
- Species: A. atlanticus

Binomial name
- Acromycter atlanticus D. G. Smith, 1989

Species of fish

Acromycter atlanticus is an eel in the family Congridae (conger/garden eels). It was described by David G. Smith in 1989. It is a marine, deep water-dwelling eel which is known from the western central Atlantic Ocean (from which its species epithet is derived). It dwells at a depth range of 503–640 meters. Males can reach a maximum total length of 29.5 centimeters.
