= Bathycongrus trimaculatus =

Conservation status
- Least Concern (IUCN 3.1)

Scientific classification
- Kingdom: Animalia
- Phylum: Chordata
- Class: Actinopterygii
- Order: Anguilliformes
- Family: Congridae
- Genus: Bathycongrus
- Species: B. trimaculatus

Binomial name
- Bathycongrus trimaculatus Karmovskaya & Smith, 2008

Species of fish

Bathycongrus trimaculatus is an eel in the family Congridae (conger/garden eels). It was described by Emma Stanislavovna Karmovskaya and David G. Smith in 2008. It is a tropical, marine eel which is known from the southwestern Pacific Ocean, including Fiji, New Caledonia, and the Solomon Islands. It dwells at a depth range of 357–550 metres. Males can reach a maximum total length of 16.1 centimetres.

The species epithet "trimaculatus" means "three spots" in Latin, and refers to the quantity of spots adorning the anal and dorsal fins of the eel.
