= Japonoconger =

Scientific classification
- Domain: Eukaryota
- Kingdom: Animalia
- Phylum: Chordata
- Class: Actinopterygii
- Order: Anguilliformes
- Family: Congridae
- Subfamily: Congrinae
- Genus: Japonoconger; Asano, 1958

Type species
- Arisoma [sic] sivicola (Matsubara & Ochiai, 1951

Species
- See text.

Genus of fishes

Japonoconger is a genus of eels in the family Congridae.

== Species ==
There are currently four recognized species in this genus:

- Japonoconger africanus (Poll, 1953)
- Japonoconger caribbeus D. G. Smith & Kanazawa, 1977
- Japonoconger proriger (Gilbert, 1891)
- Japonoconger sivicolus (Matsubara & Ochiai, 1951)
