= Castleichthys =

Castleichthys auritus

Conservation status
- Data Deficient (IUCN 3.1)

Scientific classification
- Kingdom: Animalia
- Phylum: Chordata
- Class: Actinopterygii
- Order: Anguilliformes
- Family: Congridae
- Subfamily: Congrinae
- Genus: Castleichthys; D. G. Smith, 2004
- Species: C. auritus

Binomial name
- Castleichthys auritus D. G. Smith, 2004

Genus of fishes

Castleichthys is a genus in the conger eel family, Congridae. It contains the single species Castleichthys auritus, the eared conger. The type specimen was found in the Indian Ocean off the west coast of Australia at a depth of 396 metres (1,300 ft).

The name of the genus commemorates the ichthyologist P. J. H. Castle.
