= Diploconger =

Scientific classification
- Kingdom: Animalia
- Phylum: Chordata
- Class: Actinopterygii
- Order: Anguilliformes
- Family: Congridae
- Subfamily: Congrinae
- Genus: Diploconger; Kotthaus, 1968
- Species: D. polystigmatus

Binomial name
- Diploconger polystigmatus Kotthaus, 1968

Species of fish

Diploconger polystigmatus, or the headband conger, is a species of eel in the family Congridae. It is the only member of the genus Diploconger. It is only found in the Indian Ocean off the western Pacific Ocean at depths of 37–215 meters.

== Size ==
This species reaches a length of 30.0 cm (11.8 in).
