= Kenyaconger =

Conservation status
- Data Deficient (IUCN 3.1)

Scientific classification
- Kingdom: Animalia
- Phylum: Chordata
- Class: Actinopterygii
- Order: Anguilliformes
- Family: Congridae
- Subfamily: Bathymyrinae
- Genus: Kenyaconger; D. G. Smith & Karmovskaya, 2003
- Species: K. heemstrai

Binomial name
- Kenyaconger heemstrai D. G. Smith & Karmovskaya, 2003

Species of fish

Kenyaconger heemstrai is a species of eel in the family Congridae. It is the only member of the genus Kenyaconger. It is only found in the Indian Ocean off the coast of Kenya at a depth of 275 meters.
