= Parabathymyrus =

Scientific classification
- Kingdom: Animalia
- Phylum: Chordata
- Class: Actinopterygii
- Order: Anguilliformes
- Family: Congridae
- Subfamily: Bathymyrinae
- Genus: Parabathymyrus; Kamohara, 1938

Type species
- Parabathymyrus macrophthalmus Kamohara, 1938

Genus of fishes

Parabathymyrus is a genus of eels in the family Congridae.

== Species ==
There are currently 6 recognized species in this genus:

- Parabathymyrus brachyrhynchus (Fowler, 1934)
- Parabathymyrus fijiensis Karmovskaya, 2004
- Parabathymyrus karrerae Karmovskaya, 1991
- Parabathymyrus macrophthalmus Kamohara, 1938
- Parabathymyrus oregoni D. G. Smith & Kanazawa, 1977 (Flap-nose conger)
- Parabathymyrus philippinensis H. C. Ho, D. G. Smith & K. T. Shao, 2015
