= Bassanago albescens =

Conservation status
- Least Concern (IUCN 3.1)

Scientific classification
- Kingdom: Animalia
- Phylum: Chordata
- Class: Actinopterygii
- Order: Anguilliformes
- Family: Congridae
- Genus: Bassanago
- Species: B. albescens

Binomial name
- Bassanago albescens (Barnard, 1923)

Species of fish

Bassanago albescens, the hairy conger, is a conger of the family Congridae.
