= Scalanago =

Scientific classification
- Kingdom: Animalia
- Phylum: Chordata
- Class: Actinopterygii
- Order: Anguilliformes
- Family: Congridae
- Subfamily: Congrinae
- Genus: Scalanago; Whitley, 1935
- Species: S. lateralis

Binomial name
- Scalanago lateralis Whitley, 1935

Genus of fishes

Scalanago lateralis, or the ladder eel is a species of eel in the family Congridae. It is the only member of its genus. It is only found around Australia.
