= Deepsea conger =

Conservation status
- Least Concern (IUCN 3.1)

Scientific classification
- Kingdom: Animalia
- Phylum: Chordata
- Class: Actinopterygii
- Order: Anguilliformes
- Family: Congridae
- Genus: Bassanago
- Species: B. hirsutus

Binomial name
- Bassanago hirsutus (Castle, 1960)

Synonyms
- Pseudoxenomystax hirsutus Castle, 1960

Species of fish

The deepsea conger (Bassanago hirsutus), also known as the hairy conger, is an eel in the family Congridae (conger/garden eels). It was described by Peter Henry John Castle in 1960, originally under the genus Pseudoxenomystax. It is a marine, temperate water-dwelling eel which is known from the southwestern Pacific Ocean. It leads a benthic lifestyle and inhabits continental shelves and slopes. Males can reach a maximum total length of 100 centimetres.
