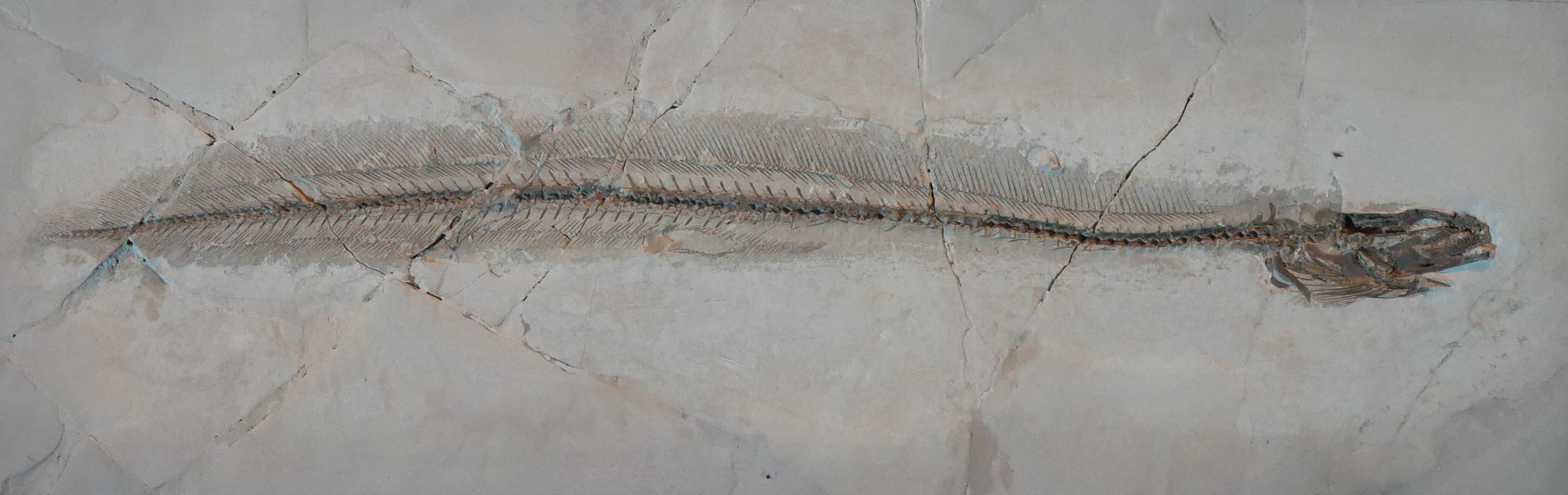
- Voltaconger latispinus

Scientific classification
- Kingdom: Animalia
- Phylum: Chordata
- Class: Actinopterygii
- Order: Anguilliformes
- Family: Congridae
- Genus: †Voltaconger

= Voltaconger =

Voltaconger Temporal range: Early- Middle Eocene

Genus of fishes

Voltaconger is an extinct genus of prehistoric bony fish that lived from the early to middle Eocene.

== See also ==
- Prehistoric fish
- List of prehistoric bony fish
