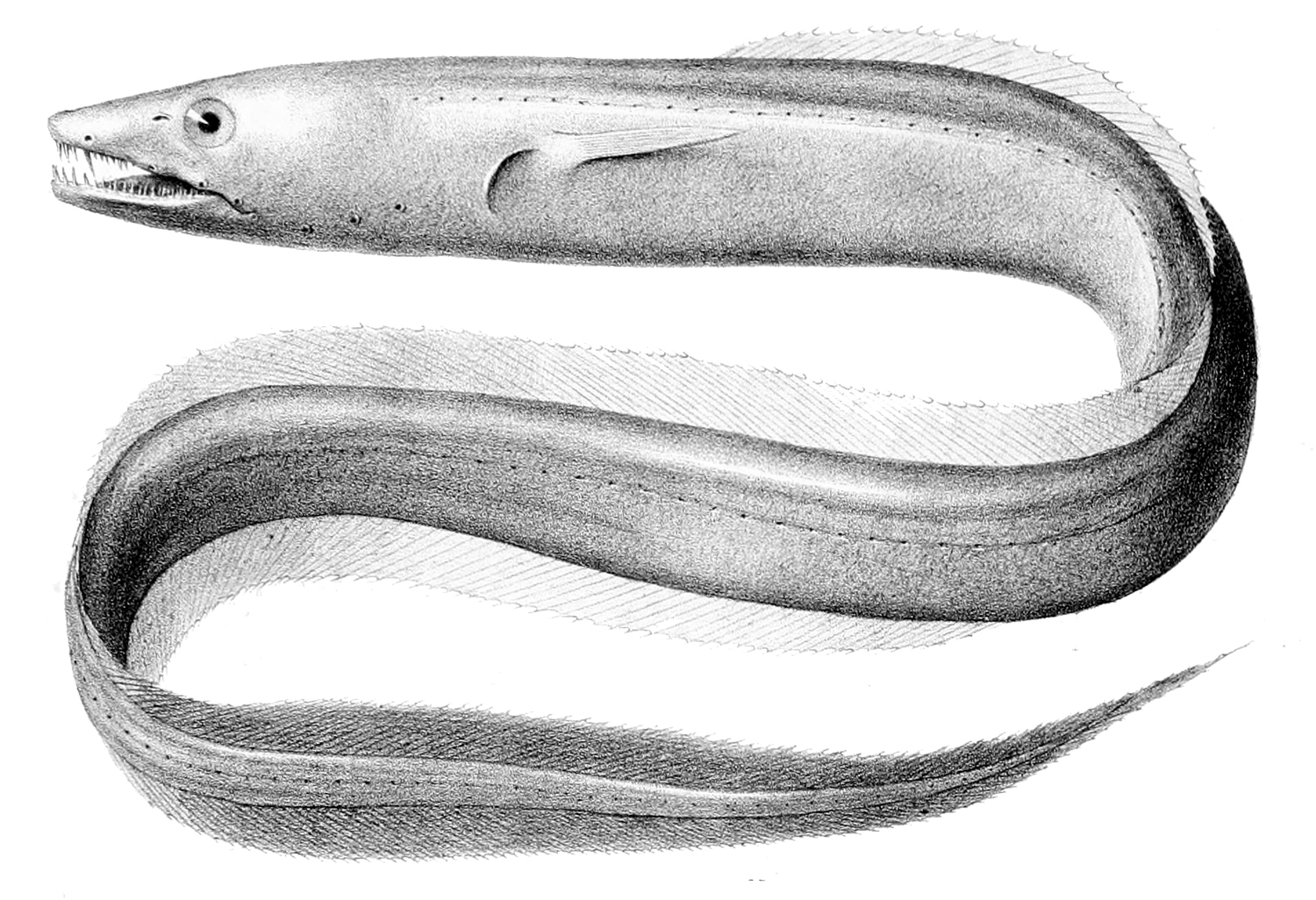
- Bathyuroconger vicinus

Scientific classification
- Kingdom: Animalia
- Phylum: Chordata
- Class: Actinopterygii
- Order: Anguilliformes
- Family: Congridae
- Subfamily: Congrinae
- Genus: Bathyuroconger; Fowler, 1934

Species
- See text.

= Bathyuroconger =

Genus of fishes

Bathyuroconger is a genus of eels in the family Congridae. It currently contains the following species:

- Bathyuroconger albus Smith, Ho, and Tashiro, 2018
- Bathyuroconger dolichosomus Smith, Ho, and Tashiro, 2018
- Bathyuroconger fowleri Smith, Ho, and Tashiro, 2018 (Fowler's large-toothed conger)
- Bathyuroconger hawaiiensis Smith, Ho, and Tashiro, 2018 (Hawaiian large-toothed conger)
- Bathyuroconger parvibranchialis (Fowler, 1934)
- Bathyuroconger vicinus (Vaillant, 1888) (Large-toothed conger)
