= Slope conger =

Conservation status
- Least Concern (IUCN 3.1)

Scientific classification
- Kingdom: Animalia
- Phylum: Chordata
- Class: Actinopterygii
- Order: Anguilliformes
- Family: Congridae
- Genus: Japonoconger
- Species: J. proriger

Binomial name
- Japonoconger proriger (C. H. Gilbert, 1891)

Synonyms
- Ariosoma prorigerum (Gilbert, 1891); Ophisoma prorigerum Gilbert, 1891; Congermuraena caudalis Garman, 1899

Species of fish

The slope conger (Japonoconger proriger), also known as the black-fin conger, is an eel in the family Congridae (conger/garden eels). It was described by Charles Henry Gilbert in 1891, originally under the genus Ophisoma. It is a marine, deep water-dwelling eel which is known from the southeastern and eastern central Pacific Ocean, including Colombia, Ecuador, Costa Rica, Honduras, El Salvador, Mexico, Guatemala, Nicaragua, Panama, and Peru. It is known to dwell at a depth range of 380–740 metres (1,250–2,430 ft), and inhabits substrates. Males can reach a maximum total length of 35 centimetres (1 ft 2 in).

Due to its widespread distribution, lack of known threats, and lack of observed population declines, the IUCN redlist currently lists the slope conger as Least Concern. There is some dispute as to whether Ariosoma or Ophisoma is the valid genus for the species.
