= Acromycter =

Scientific classification
- Domain: Eukaryota
- Kingdom: Animalia
- Phylum: Chordata
- Class: Actinopterygii
- Order: Anguilliformes
- Family: Congridae
- Subfamily: Congrinae
- Genus: Acromycter; D. G. Smith & Kanazawa, 1977

Type species
- Ariosoma perturbator Parr, 1932

Species
- See text

Genus of fishes

Acromycter is a genus of eels in the family Congridae.

== Species ==
There are currently five recognized species in this genus:

- Acromycter alcocki (C. H. Gilbert & Cramer, 1897)
- Acromycter atlanticus D. G. Smith, 1989
- Acromycter longipectoralis Karmovskaya, 2004
- Acromycter nezumi (Asano, 1958)
- Acromycter perturbator (A. E. Parr, 1932)
