= Congrhynchus =

Scientific classification
- Kingdom: Animalia
- Phylum: Chordata
- Class: Actinopterygii
- Order: Anguilliformes
- Family: Congridae
- Subfamily: Congrinae
- Genus: Congrhynchus; Fowler, 1934
- Species: C. talabonoides

Binomial name
- Congrhynchus talabonoides Fowler, 1934

Species of fish

Congrhynchus talabonoides is a species of eel in the family Congridae. It is the only member of the genus Congrhynchus. It is only found in the Pacific Ocean near the Philippines at depths of 247–393 meters.
