= Pseudophichthys =

Conservation status
- Least Concern (IUCN 3.1)

Scientific classification
- Kingdom: Animalia
- Phylum: Chordata
- Class: Actinopterygii
- Order: Anguilliformes
- Family: Congridae
- Subfamily: Congrinae
- Genus: Pseudophichthys; Roule, 1915
- Species: P. splendens

Binomial name
- Pseudophichthys splendens (E. H. M. Lea, 1913)

Synonyms
- Leptocephalus splendens (Lea, 1913); Promyllantor schmitti (Hildebrand, 1940); Pseudophichthys latedorsalis (Roule, 1915)

Species of fish

Pseudophichthys splendens, the purple-mouthed conger, is a species of eel in the family Congridae. It is the only member of its genus. It is found in the Atlantic Ocean at depths of 123–1,647 meters (404–5,404 ft).
