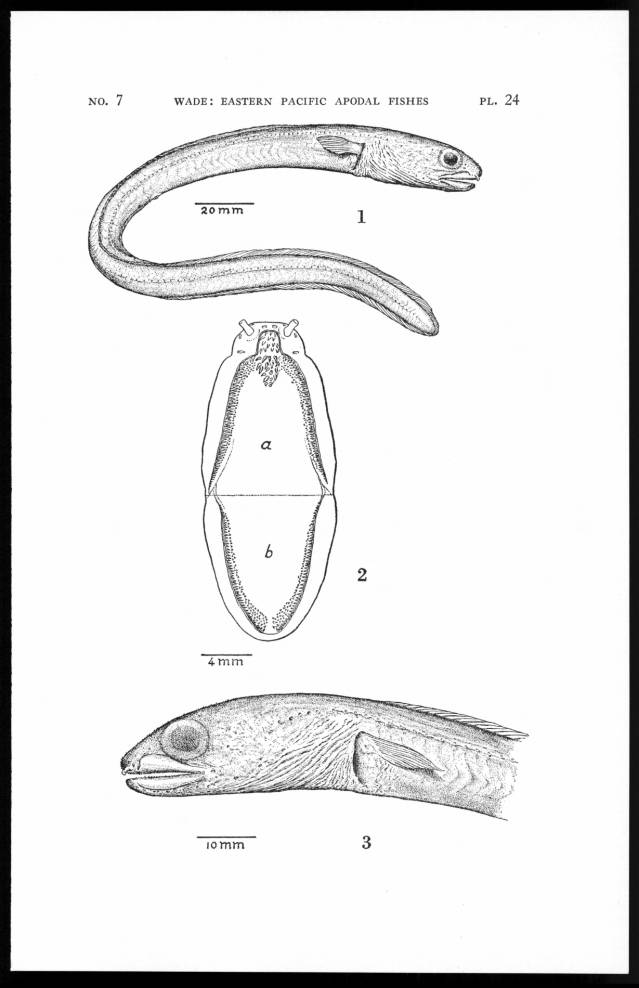
- Paraconger similis

Scientific classification
- Domain: Eukaryota
- Kingdom: Animalia
- Phylum: Chordata
- Class: Actinopterygii
- Order: Anguilliformes
- Family: Congridae
- Subfamily: Bathymyrinae
- Genus: Paraconger; Kanazawa, 1961

Type species
- Echelus caudilimbatus Poey, 1867

= Paraconger =

Genus of fishes

Paraconger is a genus of eels in the family Congridae. It currently contains the following species:

- Paraconger californiensis Kanazawa, 1961 (Californian conger)
- Paraconger caudilimbatus (Poey, 1867) (Margintail conger)
- Paraconger guianensis Kanazawa, 1961
- Paraconger macrops (Günther, 1870) (Blackspot conger)
- Paraconger notialis Kanazawa, 1961 (Guinean conger)
- Paraconger ophichthys (Garman, 1899)
- Paraconger similis (Wade, 1946) (Shorttail conger)
