= Bathymyrus =

Scientific classification
- Domain: Eukaryota
- Kingdom: Animalia
- Phylum: Chordata
- Class: Actinopterygii
- Order: Anguilliformes
- Family: Congridae
- Subfamily: Bathymyrinae
- Genus: Bathymyrus; Alcock, 1889

Type species
- Bathymyrus echinorhynchus Alcock, 1889

Species
- See text.

Genus of fishes

Bathymyrus is a genus of eels in the family Congridae. It currently contains the following species:

- Bathymyrus echinorhynchus Alcock, 1889
- Bathymyrus simus J. L. B. Smith, 1965
- Bathymyrus smithi Castle, 1968 (Maputo conger)
