= Lumiconger =

Scientific classification
- Kingdom: Animalia
- Phylum: Chordata
- Class: Actinopterygii
- Order: Anguilliformes
- Family: Congridae
- Subfamily: Congrinae
- Genus: Lumiconger; Castle & Paxton, 1984
- Species: L. arafura

Binomial name
- Lumiconger arafura Castle & Paxton, 1984

Species of fish

Lumiconger arafura, the luminous conger, is a species of eel in the family Congridae. It is the only member of the genus Lumiconger. It is only found in the Indian Ocean off the west coast of Australia at depths of 27–104 meters near the ocean floor.
