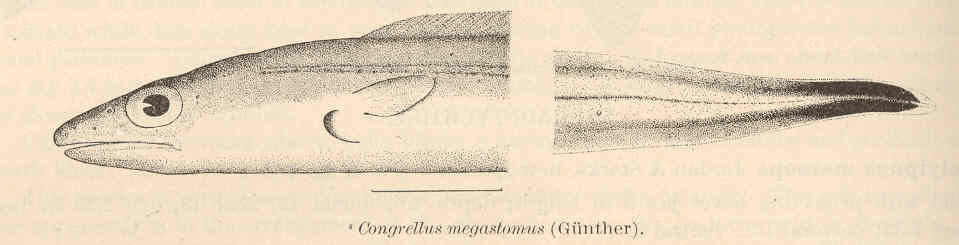
- Congriscus megastomus

Scientific classification
- Kingdom: Animalia
- Phylum: Chordata
- Class: Actinopterygii
- Order: Anguilliformes
- Family: Congridae
- Subfamily: Congrinae
- Genus: Congriscus; D. S. Jordan & C. L. Hubbs, 1925

Type species
- Congromuraena megastoma Günther, 1877

Synonyms
- Thalassenchelys Castle & Raju, 1975

= Congriscus =

Genus of fishes

Congriscus is a genus of eels in the family Congridae.

== Species ==
There are currently three recognized species in this genus:

- Congriscus maldivensis (Norman, 1939)
- Congriscus marquesaensis Karmovskaya, 2004
- Congriscus megastomus (Günther, 1877)
