= Bathycongrus polyporus =

Conservation status
- Least Concern (IUCN 3.1)

Scientific classification
- Kingdom: Animalia
- Phylum: Chordata
- Class: Actinopterygii
- Order: Anguilliformes
- Family: Congridae
- Genus: Bathycongrus
- Species: B. polyporus

Binomial name
- Bathycongrus polyporus (D. G. Smith & Kanazawa, 1977)

Synonyms
- Rhechias polypora Smith & Kanazawa, 1977

Species of fish

Bathycongrus polyporus is an eel in the family Congridae (conger/garden eels). It was described by David G. Smith and Robert H. Kanazawa in 1977, originally under the genus Rhechias. It is a marine, deep water-dwelling eel which is known from the Straits of Florida and the northern coast of Cuba, in the western central Atlantic Ocean. It dwells at a depth range of 439–549 meters. Males can reach a maximum total length of 43 centimeters.

The species epithet "polyporus" means "many pored" in Ancient Greek, and refers to the large quantity of pores in the eel's lateralis system.
