= Rostroconger =

Scientific classification
- Kingdom: Animalia
- Phylum: Chordata
- Class: Actinopterygii
- Order: Anguilliformes
- Family: Congridae
- Subfamily: Bathymyrinae
- Genus: Rostroconger; D. G. Smith, 2018
- Species: R. macrouriceps

Binomial name
- Rostroconger macrouriceps D. G. Smith, 2018

Genus of fishes

Rostroconger is a monospecific genus of marine ray-finned fish belonging to the subfamily Bathymyrinae, which is in the family Congridae, which also includes the conger and garden eels. The only species in the genus is Rostroconger macrouriceps. This species is known only from the holotype collected off Aurora Luzon in the Philippines.
