= Bathycongrus =

Scientific classification
- Kingdom: Animalia
- Phylum: Chordata
- Class: Actinopterygii
- Order: Anguilliformes
- Family: Congridae
- Subfamily: Congrinae
- Genus: Bathycongrus; J. D. Ogilby, 1898

Type species
- Congromuraena nasica Alcock, 1894

Species
- See text.

Synonyms
- Congrina D. S. Jordan & C. L. Hubbs, 1925; Microcephalocongrus ( Fowler, 1934; Pseudoxenomystax Breder, 1927; Rhechias D. S. Jordan, 1921; Uranoconger Fowler, 1934

Genus of fishes

Bathycongrus is a genus of eels in the family Congridae.

== Species ==
There are currently 30 recognized species in this genus:

- Bathycongrus aequoreus (C. H. Gilbert & Cramer, 1897)
- Bathycongrus albimarginatus Huang, Smith, Chang & Chen, 2018
- Bathycongrus bertini (Poll, 1953)
- Bathycongrus bimaculatus Smith & Ho, 2018
- Bathycongrus bleekeri Fowler, 1934
- Bathycongrus brunneus Huang, Ho & Chen, 2018
- Bathycongrus bullisi (D. G. Smith & Kanazawa, 1977) (bullish conger)
- Bathycongrus castlei Smith & Ho, 2018
- Bathycongrus dubius (Breder, 1927) (dubious conger)
- Bathycongrus graciliceps Smith & Ho, 2018
- Bathycongrus guttulatus (Günther, 1887) (Lined conger)
- Bathycongrus longicavis Karmovskaya, 2009
- Bathycongrus macrocercus (Alcock, 1894)
- Bathycongrus macroporis (Kotthaus, 1968)
- Bathycongrus macrurus (C. H. Gilbert, 1891) (Shorthead conger)
- Bathycongrus melanostomus Huang, Ho, Chen & Chan, 2022
- Bathycongrus nasicus (Alcock, 1894)
- Bathycongrus odontostomus (Fowler, 1934) (Toothy conger)
- Bathycongrus parapolyporus Karmovskaya, 2009
- Bathycongrus parviporus Karmovskaya, 2011
- Bathycongrus polyporus (D. G. Smith & Kanazawa, 1977)
- Bathycongrus retrotinctus (D. S. Jordan & Snyder, 1901) (blackedge conger) (formerly known as Bathycongrus randalli)
- Bathycongrus thysanochilus (Reid, 1934) (Conger eel)
- Bathycongrus trilineatus (Castle, 1964)
- Bathycongrus trimaculatus Karmovskaya & D. G. Smith, 2008
- Bathycongrus unimaculatus Karmovskaya, 2009
- Bathycongrus varidens (Garman, 1899) (Largehead conger)
- Bathycongrus vicinalis (Garman, 1899) (Neighbor conger)
- Bathycongrus villosus Smith, Karmovskaya & da Silva, 2020
- Bathycongrus wallacei (Castle, 1968) (Longnose conger)

== Former Species ==
Species formerly categorized as Bathycongrus, that are now listed under a different genus

- Bathycongrus mystax - now known as Gnathophis mystax (thinlip conger)
