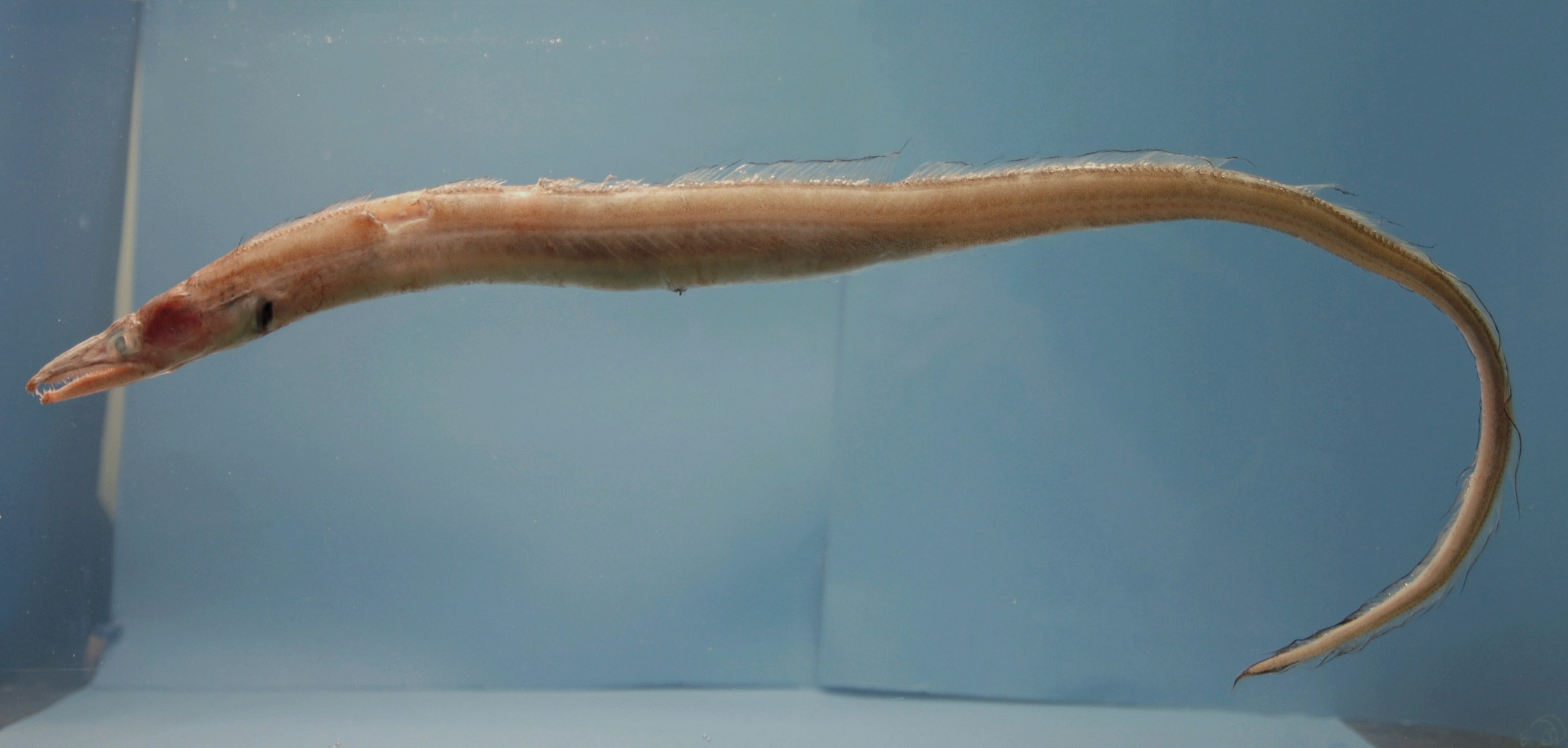
- Xenomystax congroides

Scientific classification
- Domain: Eukaryota
- Kingdom: Animalia
- Phylum: Chordata
- Class: Actinopterygii
- Order: Anguilliformes
- Family: Congridae
- Subfamily: Congrinae
- Genus: Xenomystax; Gilbert, 1891

Species
- See text

= Xenomystax =

Genus of fishes

Xenomystax is a genus of eels in the family Congridae. It currently contains the following species:

- Xenomystax atrarius C. H. Gilbert, 1891 (Deepwater conger)
- Xenomystax austrinus D. G. Smith & Kanazawa, 1989
- Xenomystax bidentatus (Reid, 1940)
- Xenomystax congroides D. G. Smith & Kanazawa, 1989 (Bristletooth conger)
- Xenomystax trucidans Alcock, 1894
