= Paruroconger =

Conservation status
- Data Deficient (IUCN 3.1)

Scientific classification
- Kingdom: Animalia
- Phylum: Chordata
- Class: Actinopterygii
- Order: Anguilliformes
- Family: Congridae
- Subfamily: Congrinae
- Genus: Paruroconger; Blache & Bauchot, 1976
- Species: P. drachi

Binomial name
- Paruroconger drachi Blache & Bauchot, 1976

Species of fish

Paruroconger is a monospecific genus of marine ray-finned fish belonging to the subfamily Congrinae, the conger eels, in the family Congridae, which also includes the garden eels. The only species in the genus is Paruroconger drachi, an eel which is known only from the holotype collected in the Eastern Atlantic Ocean off Pointe-Noire in the Republic of Congo.
