= Blachea =

Scientific classification
- Kingdom: Animalia
- Phylum: Chordata
- Class: Actinopterygii
- Order: Anguilliformes
- Family: Congridae
- Subfamily: Congrinae
- Genus: Blachea; Karrer & D. G. Smith, 1980

Species
- See text

Genus of fishes

Blachea is a genus of eels in the family Congridae.

== Species ==
There are currently two recognized species in this genus:

- Blachea longicaudalis Karmovskaya, 2004
- Blachea xenobranchialis Karrer & D. G. Smith, 1980 (frillgill conger)
