= Bassanago =

- Bassanago bulbiceps

Scientific classification
- Kingdom: Animalia
- Phylum: Chordata
- Class: Actinopterygii
- Order: Anguilliformes
- Family: Congridae
- Subfamily: Congrinae
- Genus: Bassanago; Whitley, 1948

Type species
- Bassanago bulbiceps Whitley, 1948

Species
- See text.

Genus of fishes

Bassanago is a genus of marine congrid eels.

== Species ==
There are currently four recognized species in this genus:

- Bassanago albescens (Barnard, 1923) (hairy conger)
- Bassanago bulbiceps Whitley, 1948 (swollen-headed conger eel)
- Bassanago hirsutus (Castle, 1960) (deepsea conger)
- Bassanago nielseni (Karmovskaya, 1990)
