= Congrosoma =

Scientific classification
- Kingdom: Animalia
- Phylum: Chordata
- Class: Actinopterygii
- Order: Anguilliformes
- Family: Congridae
- Subfamily: Congrinae
- Genus: Congrosoma; Garman, 1899
- Species: C. evermanni

Binomial name
- Congrosoma evermanni Garman, 1899

Species of fish

Congrosoma evermanni, or the Evermann's conger, is a species of eel in the family Congridae. It is the only member of the genus Congrosoma. It is only found in the Pacific Ocean off the west coast of Panama at a depth of 333 meters.
