= Macrocephenchelys =

Scientific classification
- Kingdom: Animalia
- Phylum: Chordata
- Class: Actinopterygii
- Order: Anguilliformes
- Family: Congridae
- Subfamily: Congrinae
- Genus: Macrocephenchelys; Fowler, 1934

Species
- See text.

Genus of fishes

Macrocephenchelys is a genus of eels in the family Congridae.

== Species ==
There are currently two recognized species in this genus:

- Macrocephenchelys brachialis Fowler, 1934
- Macrocephenchelys brevirostris (J. S. T. F. Chen & H. T. C. Weng, 1967) (Rubbernose conger)
