= Chiloconger =

Scientific classification
- Kingdom: Animalia
- Phylum: Chordata
- Class: Actinopterygii
- Order: Anguilliformes
- Family: Congridae
- Subfamily: Bathymyrinae
- Genus: Chiloconger; G. S. Myers & Wade, 1941

Type species
- Chiloconger labiatus Myers & Wade, 1941

Species
- See text.

Genus of fishes

Chiloconger is a genus of eels in the family Congridae.

== Species ==
There are currently two recognized species in this genus:

- Chiloconger dentatus (Garman, 1899) (Shortsnout conger)
- Chiloconger philippinensis D. G. Smith & Karmovskaya, 2003
