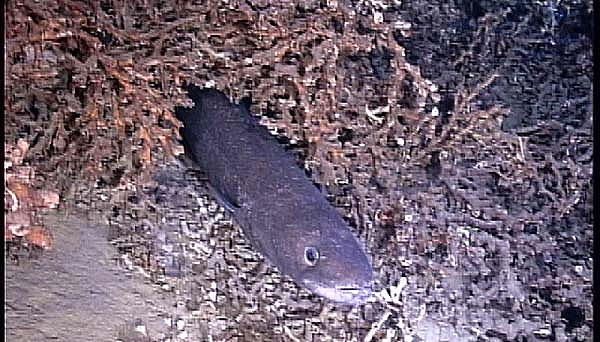
- Conger eel

Scientific classification
- Kingdom: Animalia
- Phylum: Chordata
- Class: Actinopterygii
- Order: Anguilliformes
- Family: Congridae
- Subfamily: Congrinae; Kaup, 1856

= Congrinae =

Conger

Subfamily of fishes

The Congrinae are a subfamily of eels in the family Congridae.

== Genera ==
Congrinae contains the following genera:

- Acromycter D. G. Smith & Kanazawa, 1977
- Bassanago Whitley, 1948
- Bathycongrus Ogilby, 1898
- Bathyuroconger Fowler, 1934
- Blachea Karrer & D. G. Smith, 1980
- Castleichthys D. G. Smith, 2004
- Conger Bosc, 1817
- Congrhynchus Fowler, 1934
- Congriscus D.S. Jordan & C. L. Hubbs, 1925
- Congrosoma Garman, 1899
- Diploconger Kotthaus, 1968
- Gavialiceps Alcock, 1889
- Gnathophis Kaup, 1860.
- Japonoconger Asano, 1958
- Lumiconger Castle & Paxton, 1984
- Macrocephenchelys Fowler, 1934
- Paruroconger Blache & Bauchot, 1976
- Promyllantor Alcock, 1890
- Pseudophichthys Roule, 1915
- Rhynchoconger D. S. Jordan & C.L. Hubbs, 1925
- Scalanago Whitley, 1935
- Uroconger Kaup, 1856
- Xenomystax Gilbert, 1891
