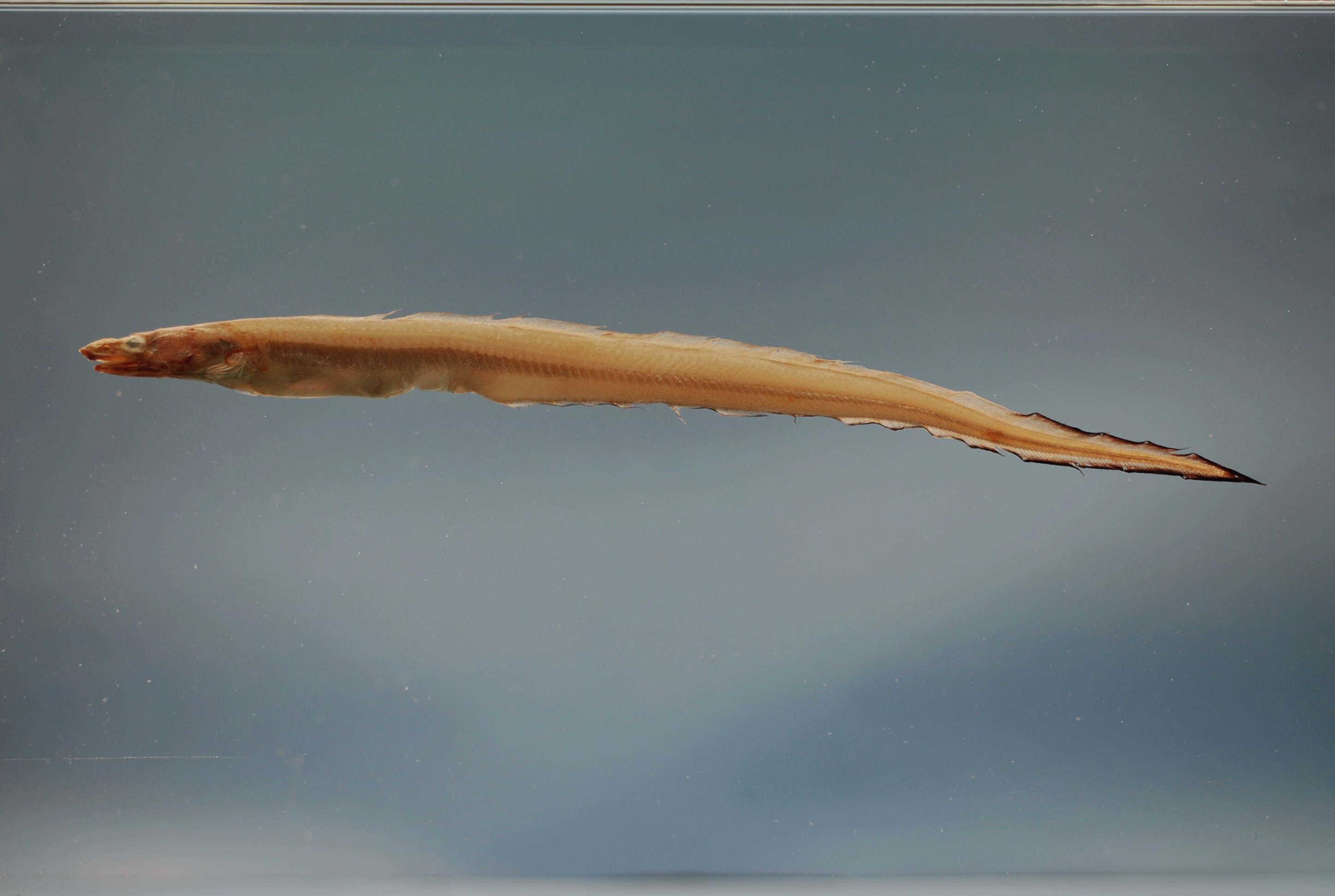
- Rhynchoconger flavus

Scientific classification
- Kingdom: Animalia
- Phylum: Chordata
- Class: Actinopterygii
- Division: Teleostei
- Order: Anguilliformes
- Family: Congridae
- Subfamily: Congrinae
- Genus: Rhynchoconger; D. S. Jordan & C. L. Hubbs, 1925

Type species
- Leptocephalus ectenurus D. S. Jordan & Richardson, 1909

= Rhynchoconger =

Genus of fishes

Rhynchoconger is a genus of eels in the family Congridae.

== Species ==
The following species are currently recognised:

- Rhynchoconger bicoloratus Kodeeswaran, Mohapatra, Kumar & Lal, 2023 (Bicolor conger)
- Rhynchoconger ectenurus (D. S. Jordan & R. E. Richardson, 1909)
- Rhynchoconger flavus (Goode & T. H. Bean, 1896) (Yellow conger)
- Rhynchoconger gracilior (Ginsburg, 1951) (Whiptail conger)
- Rhynchoconger guppyi (Norman, 1925)
- Rhynchoconger humbermariorum (Tommasi, 1960) (Species inquirenda)
- Rhynchoconger nitens (D. S. Jordan & Bollman, 1890) (Bignose conger)
- Rhynchoconger smithi Mohapatra, Ho, Acharya, Ray & Mishra, 2022
- Rhynchoconger squaliceps (Alcock, 1894)
- Rhynchoconger trewavasae Ben-Tuvia, 1993
