= Promyllantor =

Scientific classification
- Domain: Eukaryota
- Kingdom: Animalia
- Phylum: Chordata
- Class: Actinopterygii
- Order: Anguilliformes
- Family: Congridae
- Subfamily: Congrinae
- Genus: Promyllantor; Alcock, 1890

Type species
- Promyllantor purpureus Alcock, 1890

Species
- See text.

Genus of fishes

Promyllantor is a genus of eels in the family Congridae.

== Species ==
There are currently three recognized species in this genus:

- Promyllantor adenensis (Klausewitz, 1991)
- Promyllantor atlanticus Karmovskaya, 2006
- Promyllantor purpureus Alcock, 1890
