= Paracongroides =

Paracongroides Temporal range: Early- Middle Eocene

Scientific classification
- Domain: Eukaryota
- Kingdom: Animalia
- Phylum: Chordata
- Class: Actinopterygii
- Order: Anguilliformes
- Genus: †Paracongroides; Blot, 1978

Paracongroides is an extinct genus of prehistoric bony fish that lived from the early to middle Eocene period.

== See also ==
- Prehistoric fish
- List of prehistoric bony fish
