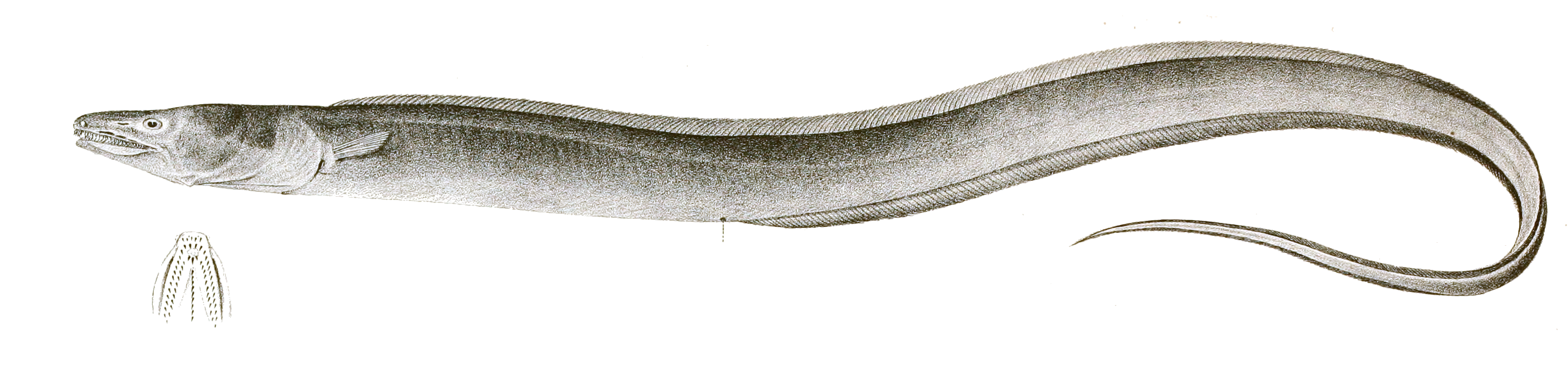

Scientific classification
- Kingdom: Animalia
- Phylum: Chordata
- Class: Actinopterygii
- Order: Anguilliformes
- Family: Congridae
- Subfamily: Congrinae
- Genus: Uroconger; Kaup, 1856

Type species
- Congrus lepturus Richardson 1845

Species
- See text.

= Uroconger =

Genus of fishes

Uroconger is a genus of eels in the family Congridae. It currently contains the following species:

- Uroconger erythraeus Castle, 1982
- Uroconger lepturus (J. Richardson, 1845) (Slender conger)
- Uroconger syringinus Ginsburg, 1954 (Threadtail conger)
