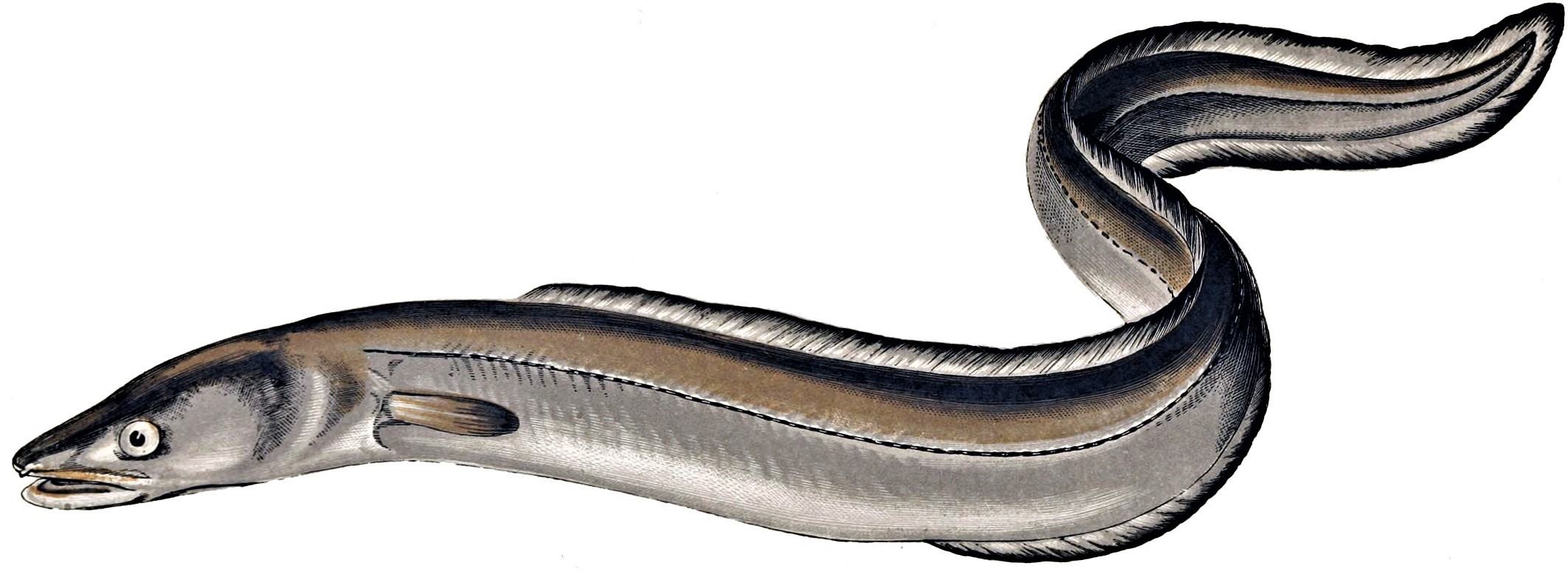
- Conger conger

Scientific classification
- Kingdom: Animalia
- Phylum: Chordata
- Class: Actinopterygii
- Order: Anguilliformes
- Suborder: Congroidei
- Family: Congridae; Kaup, 1856

Subfamilies
- Bathymyrinae; Congrinae; Heterocongrinae

= Congridae =

Conger and garden eels Temporal range: Campanian–present

Family of fishes

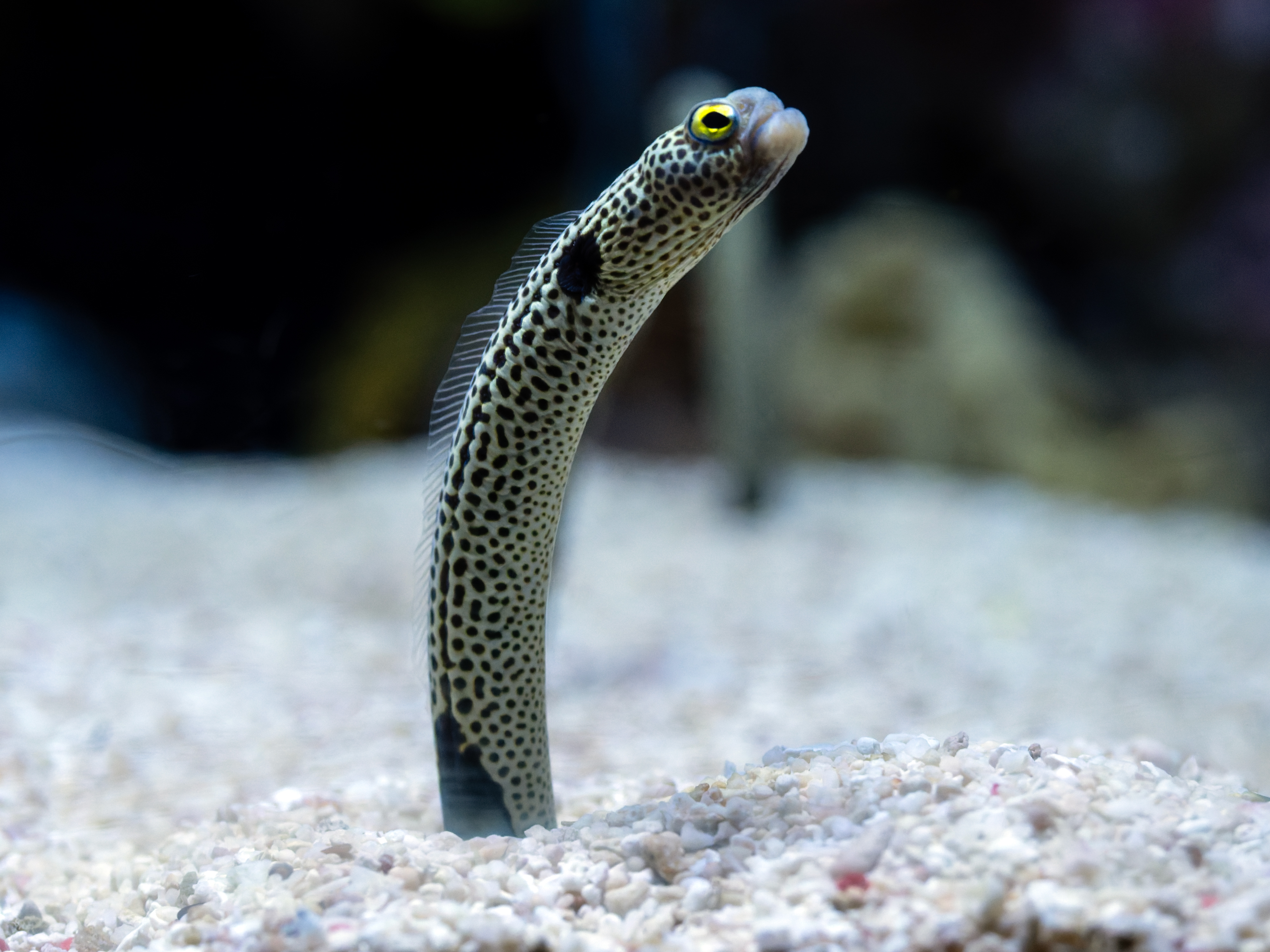
Spotted garden eel (Heteroconger hassi)

The Congridae are the family of conger and garden eels. Congers are valuable and often large food fishes, while garden eels live in colonies, all protruding from the sea floor after the manner of plants in a garden (thus the name). The family includes over 220 species in 32 genera.

The European conger, Conger conger, is the largest of the family and of the Anguilliformes order that includes it; it has been recorded at up to 3 m (9.8 ft) in length and weighing 350 lb (160 kg).

Congrids are found in tropical, subtropical and temperate seas around the world. Clear distinguishing features among congrids are few; they all lack scales, and most possess pectoral fins. They feed on crustaceans and small fish.

The earliest known fossils of this group are otoliths from the Campanian of the United States. A number of articulated specimens are known from the Paleogene of Europe.

== Genera ==
The Congridae is divided into the following subfamilies and genera:

- †Alaconger Schwarzhans, 2010 (2 species; otolith-based taxon; Late Cretaceous of the United States and Germany)
- †Bolcyrus Blot, 1978 (1 species, fossil; Eocene of Italy)
- †Congrophichthus Schwarzhans & Stringer,2020 (1 species; otolith-based taxon; Late Cretaceous and Early Paleocene of the United States)
- †Voltaconger Blot, 1978' (1 species, fossil; Eocene of Italy)
- Subfamily Bathymyrinae J. E. Böhlke, 1949
  - Ariosoma Swainson, 1838 (39 species)
  - Bathymyrus Alcock, 1889 (three species)
  - Chiloconger Myers & Wade, 1941 (two species)
  - Kenyaconger D. G. Smith & Karmovskaya, 2003 (one species)
  - Parabathymyrus Kamohara, 1938 (six species)
  - Paraconger Kanazawa, 1961 (seven species)
  - Rostroconger D. G. Smith, 2015 (one species)
  - †Paracongroides Blot, 1978 (1 species, fossil; Eocene of Italy)
  - †Pavelichthys Bannikov & Fedotov, 1984 (1 species, fossil; Oligocene of Russia)
- Subfamily Congrinae Kaup, 1856
  - Acromycter D. G. Smith & Kanazawa, 1977 (five species)
  - Bassanago Whitley, 1938 (four species)
  - Bathycongrus Ogilby, 1898 (22 species)
  - Bathyuroconger Fowler, 1934 (six species)
  - Blachea Karrer & D. G. Smith, 1980 (two species)
  - Castleichthys D. G. Smith, 2004 (one species)
  - Conger Bosc, 1817 (21 species)
  - Congrhynchus Fowler, 1934 (one species)
  - Congriscus D. S. Jordan & C. L. Hubbs, 1925 (three species)
  - Congrosoma Garman, 1899 (one species)
  - Diploconger Kotthaus, 1968 (one species)
  - Gavialiceps Alcock, 1889 (five species)
  - Gnathophis Kaup, 1859 (27 species)
  - Japonoconger Asano, 1958 (three species)
  - Lumiconger Castle & Paxton, 1984 (one species)
  - Macrocephenchelys Fowler, 1856 (two species)
  - Paruroconger Blache & Bauchot, 1976
  - Promyllantor Allcock, 1890 (three species)
  - Pseudophichthys Roule, 1915 (one species)
  - Rhynchoconger D. S. Jordan & C. L. Hubbs, 1925 (10 species)
  - Scalanago Whitley, 1935 (one species)
  - †Smithconger Carnevale, Schwarzhans, Schrøder & Lindow, 2022 (two species, fossil & otolith; Eocene of Denmark & New Zealand)
  - Uroconger Kaup, 1856 (four species)
  - Xenomystax Gilbert, 1891 (five species)
- Subfamily Heterocongrinae Günther, 1870 (garden eels)
  - Gorgasia Meek & Hildebrand, 1923 (14 species)
  - Heteroconger Bleeker, 1868 (24 species)

== See also ==
- List of fish families
