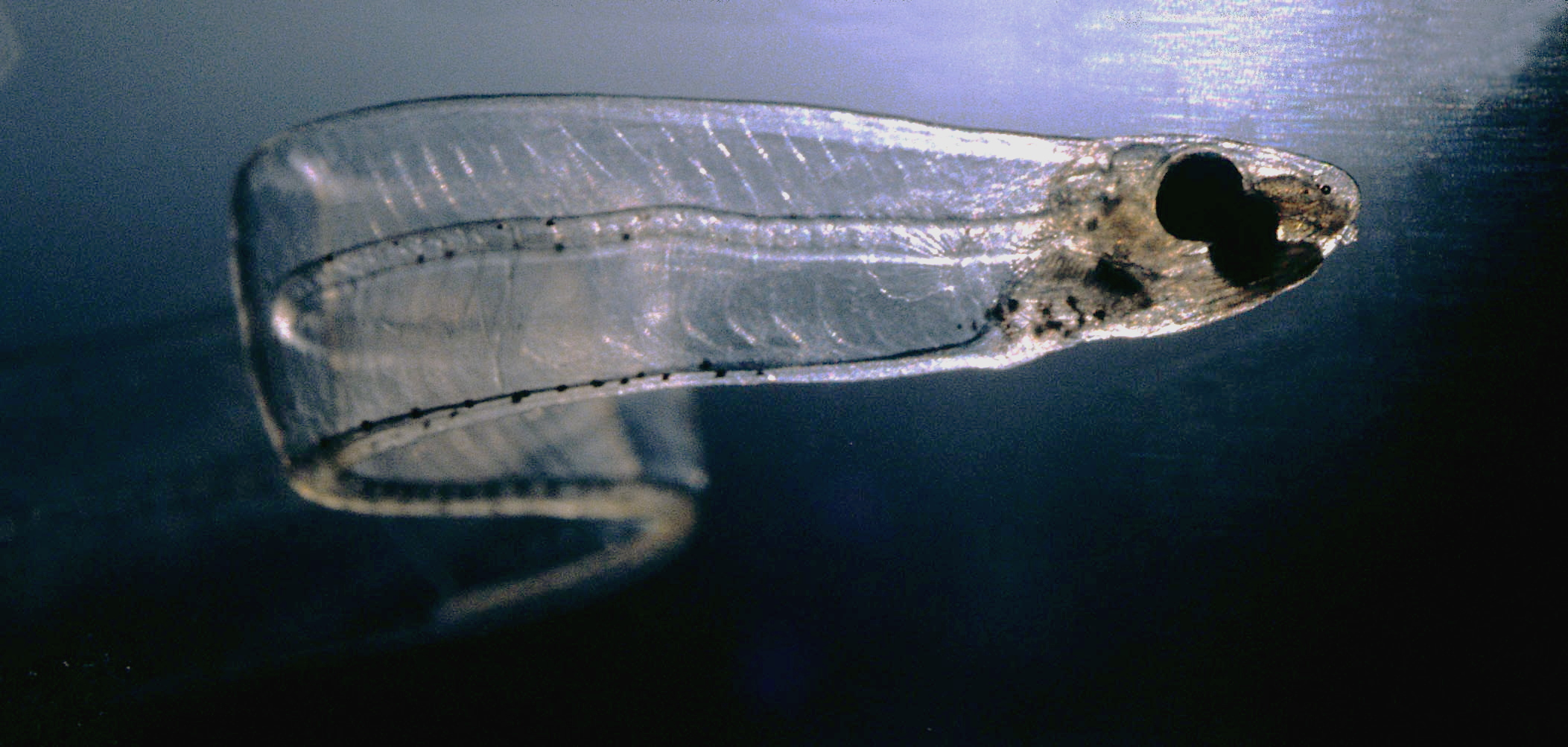
- Leptocephalus conger

Scientific classification
- Kingdom: Animalia
- Phylum: Chordata
- Class: Actinopterygii
- Order: Anguilliformes
- Family: See text
- Genus: Leptocephalus Scopoli, 1777 (ex Gronow)

= Leptocephalus (genus) =

Genus of fishes

Leptocephalus is an obsolete genus that was used to classify larval eels, now called leptocephali. Leptocephali larvae differ so much in appearance from the adults that, when first discovered, they were thought to be a distinct type of fish, and not any type of eel. Because of this, the genus Leptocephalus was historically used to accommodate unidentified leptocephali. After their nature as eel larvae became known, it was recognized as a wastebasket taxon; the genus is not used in present classification systems.

== Species ==
Due to being used to classify leptocephalus-stage larvae of many eel species, members of the genus belong to many families; the genus would be polyphyletic in the modern sense. The following species of Leptocephalus were named, with their valid names appearing after the dash (–):

- Leptocephalus acuticeps Regan, 1916 – Avocettina acuticeps (Regan, 1916)
- Leptocephalus affinis Facciolà, 1883 – Ariosoma balearicum (Delaroche, 1809)
- Leptocephalus andreae Schmidt, 1912 – Nemichthys scolopaceus Richardson, 1848
- Leptocephalus anguilloides Schmidt, 1916 – Derichthys serpentinus Gill, 1884
- Leptocephalus arabicus D'Ancona, 1928 – Gavialiceps arabicus (D'Ancona, 1928)
- Leptocephalus brevirostris Kaup, 1856 – Anguilla anguilla (Linnaeus, 1758)
- Leptocephalus canaricus Lea, 1913 – Nemichthys scolopaceus Richardson, 1848
- Leptocephalus candidissimus Costa, 1832 – Conger conger (Linnaeus, 1758)
- Leptocephalus capensis Kaup, 1856 – Gnathophis capensis (Kaup, 1856)
- Leptocephalus caudomaculatus Eigenmann & Kennedy, 1902 – Echiophis intertinctus (Richardson, 1848)
- Leptocephalus conger (Linnaeus, 1758) – Conger conger (Linnaeus, 1758)
- Leptocephalus conger Eigenmann, 1902 – Ophichthus cruentifer (Goode & Bean, 1896)
- Leptocephalus congroides D'Ancona, 1928 – Heteroconger congroides (D'Ancona, 1928)
- Leptocephalus cotroneii D'Ancona, 1928 – Gorgasia cotroneii (D'Ancona, 1928)
- Leptocephalus crenatus Strömman, 1896 – Ahlia egmontis (Jordan, 1884)
- Leptocephalus curvirostris Strömman, 1896 – Nemichthys curvirostris (Strömman, 1896)
- Leptocephalus diptychus Eigenmann & Kennedy, 1901 – Moringua edwardsi (Jordan & Bollman, 1889)
- Leptocephalus dolichorhynchus Lea, 1913 – Synaphobranchus dolichorhynchus (Lea, 1913)
- Leptocephalus echeloides D'Ancona, 1928 – Ophichthus echeloides (D'Ancona, 1928)
- Leptocephalus eckmani Strömman, 1896 (lapsus Leptocephalus ekmani) – Ariosoma balearicum (Delaroche, 1809)
- Leptocephalus ectenurus Jordan & Richardson, 1909 – Rhynchoconger ectenurus (Jordan & Richardson, 1909)
- Leptocephalus erebennus Jordan & Snyder, 1901 – Conger erebennus (Jordan & Snyder, 1901)
- Leptocephalus euryurus Lea, 1913 – Anarchias euryurus (Lea, 1913)
- Leptocephalus forsstromi Strömman, 1896 (lapsus Leptocephalus forstromi) – Gymnothorax vicinus (Castelnau, 1855)
- Leptocephalus giganteus Castle, 1959 – Coloconger giganteus (Castle, 1959)
- Leptocephalus gilberti Eigenmann & Kennedy, 1902 – Bascanichthys bascanium (Jordan, 1884)
- Leptocephalus grassii Eigenmann & Kennedy, 1902 – Anguilla rostrata (Lesueur, 1817)
- Leptocephalus gussoni Cocco, 1829 – Conger conger (Linnaeus, 1758)
- Leptocephalus hexastigma Regan, 1916 – Ahlia egmontis (Jordan, 1884)
- Leptocephalus humilis Strömman, 1896 – Ahlia egmontis (Jordan, 1884)
- Leptocephalus hyoproroides Strömman, 1896 – Kaupichthys hyoproroides (Strömman, 1896)
- Leptocephalus inaequalis Facciolà, 1883 – Conger conger (Linnaeus, 1758)
- Leptocephalus inferomaculatus Blache, 1977 – Gorgasia inferomaculata (Blache, 1977)
- Leptocephalus ingolfianus Schmidt, 1912 – Nessorhamphus ingolfianus (Schmidt, 1912)
- Leptocephalus inornatus Facciolà, 1883 – Ariosoma balearicum (Delaroche, 1809)
- Leptocephalus kefersteini Kaup, 1860 – Echelus myrus (Linnaeus, 1758)
- Leptocephalus lanceolatoides Schmidt, 1916 – Serrivomer lanceolatoides (Schmidt, 1916)
- Leptocephalus lanceolatus Strömman, 1896 – Serrivomer beanii Gill & Ryder, 1883
- Leptocephalus lateromaculatus D'Ancona, 1928 – Saurenchelys lateromaculata (D'Ancona, 1928)
- Leptocephalus latissimus Schmidt, 1912 – Saccopharynx ampullaceus (Harwood, 1827)
- Leptocephalus lineatus Bonnaterre, 1788 – Conger conger (Linnaeus, 1758)
- Leptocephalus longirostris Kaup, 1856 – Nettastoma melanura Rafinesque, 1810
- Leptocephalus maculatus Della Croce & Castle, 1966 – Heteroconger hassi (Klausewitz & Eibl-Eibesfeldt, 1959)
- Leptocephalus marginatus Kaup, 1856 – Ariosoma balearicum (Delaroche, 1809)
- Leptocephalus mauritianus Pappenheim, 1914 (lapsus Leptocephalus mauritianum) – Ariosoma mauritianum (Pappenheim, 1914)
- Leptocephalus microphthalmus Beebe & Tee-Van, 1928 – Ariosoma balearicum (Delaroche, 1809)
- Leptocephalus mollis Fowler, 1944 – Myrophis punctatus Lütken, 1852
- Leptocephalus mongolicus Basilewsky, 1855 – Chanodichthys mongolicus (Basilewsky, 1855)
- Leptocephalus morrisii Gmelin, 1789 – Conger conger (Linnaeus, 1758)
- Leptocephalus mucronatus Eigenmann & Kennedy, 1902 – Ophichthus cruentifer (Goode & Bean, 1896)
- Leptocephalus nystromi Jordan & Snyder, 1901 – Gnathophis nystromi (Jordan & Snyder, 1901)
- Leptocephalus orbignyanus (Valenciennes, 1837) – Conger orbignianus Valenciennes, 1837
- Leptocephalus oxycephalus Pappenheim, 1914 – Avocettina infans (Günther, 1878)
- Leptocephalus oxyrhynchus Bellotti, 1883 – Facciolella oxyrhynchus (Bellotti, 1883)
- Leptocephalus pellucidus (Couch, 1832) – Conger conger (Linnaeus, 1758)
- Leptocephalus polymerus Lea, 1913 – Nemichthys curvirostris (Strömman, 1896)
- Leptocephalus proboscideus Lea, 1913 – Dysommina proboscideus (Lea, 1913)
- Leptocephalus pseudolatissimus Bertin, 1936 – Eurypharynx pelecanoides Vaillant, 1882
- Leptocephalus retrotinctus Jordan & Snyder, 1901 – Bathycongrus retrotinctus (Jordan & Snyder, 1901)
- Leptocephalus rex Eigenmann & Kennedy, 1902 – Ariosoma balearicum (Delaroche, 1809)
- Leptocephalus sanzoi D'Ancona, 1928 – Ariosoma sanzoi (D'Ancona, 1928)
- Leptocephalus saurencheloides D'Ancona, 1928 – Facciolella saurencheloides (D'Ancona, 1928)
- Leptocephalus scheelei Strömman, 1896 – Ariosoma scheelei (Strömman, 1896)
- Leptocephalus similis Lea, 1913 – Anarchias similis (Lea, 1913)
- Leptocephalus spallanzani Risso, 1810 – Conger conger (Linnaeus, 1758)
- Leptocephalus splendens Lea, 1913 – Pseudophichthys splendens (Lea, 1913)
- Leptocephalus stenops Kaup, 1856 – Conger conger (Linnaeus, 1758)
- Leptocephalus stylurus Lea, 1913 – Saurenchelys stylura (Lea, 1913)
- Leptocephalus taenia Kaup, 1856 – Ariosoma balearicum (Delaroche, 1809)
- Leptocephalus telescopicus Schmidt, 1913 – Dysomma brevirostre (Facciolà, 1887)
- Leptocephalus trilineatus Castle, 1964 – Bathycongrus trilineatus (Castle, 1964)
- Leptocephalus tuberculatus Castle, 1965 – Neoconger tuberculatus (Castle, 1965)
- Leptocephalus undulatus Strömman, 1896 – Myrichthys breviceps (Richardson, 1848)
- Leptocephalus urosema Lea, 1913 – Nettastoma melanura Rafinesque, 1810
- Leptocephalus vitreus Kölliker, 1853 – Conger conger (Linnaeus, 1758)
- Leptocephalus wilsoni (Bloch & Schneider, 1801) – Conger wilsoni (Bloch & Schneider, 1801)
