= Baleares =

Baleares may refer to:

- Balearic Islands (Spanish: Islas Baleares)
- Baleares-class frigate
  - Spanish cruiser Baleares, a warship

== See also ==
- Bandtooth conger, or Baleares conger, an eel
