= Facciolella =

Scientific classification
- Kingdom: Animalia
- Phylum: Chordata
- Class: Actinopterygii
- Order: Anguilliformes
- Family: Nettastomatidae
- Genus: Facciolella; Whitley, 1938

Type species
- Nettastomella physonima Facciolà 1914

Species
- See text.

Synonyms
- Nettastomella Facciolà, 1911

Genus of fishes

Facciolella is a genus of eels in the duckbill eel family Nettastomatidae.

== Species ==
There are currently six recognized species in this genus:

- Facciolella castlei Parin & Karmovskaya, 1985
- Facciolella equatorialis (C. H. Gilbert, 1891) (Dogface witch eel)
- Facciolella karreri Klausewitz, 1995
- Facciolella oxyrhynchus (Bellotti, 1883) (Facciola's sorcerer)
- Facciolella saurencheloides (D'Ancona, 1928)
- Facciolella smithi (2025)
