= Gorgasia cotroneii =

Conservation status
- Data Deficient (IUCN 3.1)

Scientific classification
- Kingdom: Animalia
- Phylum: Chordata
- Class: Actinopterygii
- Order: Anguilliformes
- Family: Congridae
- Genus: Gorgasia
- Species: G. cotroneii

Binomial name
- Gorgasia cotroneii (D'Ancona, 1928)

Synonyms
- Leptocephalus cotroneii D'Ancona, 1928

Species of fish

Gorgasia cotroneii is an eel in the family Congridae (conger/garden eels). It was described by Umberto D'Ancona in 1928, originally under the genus Leptocephalus. It is a marine, tropical eel which is known from the Red Sea, in the western Indian Ocean.

== Etymology ==
The fish is named in honor of Italian zoologist Giulio Cotronei (1885–1962), who was Director of the Institute of Comparative Anatomy, R. Università di Roma, where describer D'Ancona was based.
