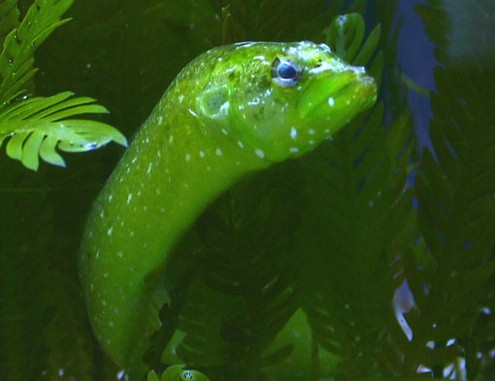
- Congrogadus subducens

Scientific classification
- Kingdom: Animalia
- Phylum: Chordata
- Class: Actinopterygii
- Clade: Ovalentaria
- Order: Blenniiformes
- Family: Pseudochromidae
- Subfamily: Congrogadinae; Günther, 1862

= Congrogadinae =

Subfamily of fishes

Congrogadinae is a subfamily of ray-finned fishes, one of four subfamilies that make up the family Pseudochromidae, these elongated fish are commonly called eel-blennies.

== Characteristics ==
The species in the subfamily Congrogadidae have elongated rather eel-like bodies which are covered in with small cycloid scales. Their dorsal fin normally has a single robust spine and 32–79 rays while the anal fin lacks any spines and has 26–66 rays. The dorsal and anal fins are long and the pelvic fin is sometimes present but in more than half the species it is absent. The caudal fin is joined to the long dorsal and anal fins in a small number of species but is separated in all the others. They have a protractable mouth and there is a rear facing spine on the opercle. They have between one and three complete or partial lateral lines. There are no teeth on the palatine and they may or may not be present on the vomerine bone. They grow to a maximum length of 40 centimetres (16 in).

They lay eggs which are covered in hooks, some of which may develop into filaments. The eggs are clumped together in an egg mass the hooks on the eggs' surfaces interlocking with each other, which is most likely guarded by the male.

== Distribution and habitat ==
The species in the Congrogadinae inhabit coral reefs as well as sand and mud substrates from the intertidal zone down to 140 metres (460 ft). They are found in the Indo-Pacific region. There is one species which lives within sponges which is found in the Gulf of Carpentaria. The subfamily is thought to have arisen in the proto Indian Ocean before Gondwanaland broke up and dispersed into the western Pacific Ocean.

== Genera ==
The following genera are included within the Congrogadinae:

- Blennodesmus Günther, 1872
- Congrogadus Günther, 1862
- Halidesmus Günther, 1872
- Halimuraena J. L. B. Smith, 1952
- Halimuraenoides Maugé & Bardach, 1985
- Haliophis Rüppell, 1829
- Natalichthys Winterbottom, 1980
- Rusichthys Winterbottom, 1979
