= Saurenchelys lateromaculata =

Conservation status
- Data Deficient (IUCN 3.1)

Scientific classification
- Kingdom: Animalia
- Phylum: Chordata
- Class: Actinopterygii
- Order: Anguilliformes
- Family: Nettastomatidae
- Genus: Saurenchelys
- Species: S. lateromaculata

Binomial name
- Saurenchelys lateromaculata (D'Ancona, 1928)

Synonyms
- Leptocephalus lateromaculatus D'Ancona, 1928

Species of fish

Saurenchelys lateromaculata is a species of eel in the family Nettastomatidae. It was described by Umberto D'Ancona in 1928, originally under the genus Leptocephalus. It is a marine, tropical eel which is known from the Indo-Western Pacific, including the South China Sea and possibly also the Red Sea.
