= Ariosoma major =

Conservation status
- Least Concern (IUCN 3.1)

Scientific classification
- Kingdom: Animalia
- Phylum: Chordata
- Class: Actinopterygii
- Order: Anguilliformes
- Family: Congridae
- Genus: Ariosoma
- Species: A. major

Binomial name
- Ariosoma major (Asano, 1958)

Synonyms
- Alloconger shiroanago major Asano, 1958; Ariosoma shiroanago major (Asano, 1958)

Species of fish

Ariosoma major is an eel in the family Congridae (conger/garden eels). It was described by Hirotoshi Asano in 1958, originally as a subspecies of Alloconger shiroanago, which was later moved under the genus Ariosoma. It is a marine, temperate water-dwelling eel which is known from the eastern China Sea, Japan, and Taiwan, in the northwestern Pacific Ocean. It has a widespread distribution, and inhabits sandy regions. Males can reach a maximum total length of 53 centimetres.

The diet of Ariosoma major consists primarily of bony fish and crabs.
