= Gavialiceps arabicus =

Conservation status
- Least Concern (IUCN 3.1)

Scientific classification
- Kingdom: Animalia
- Phylum: Chordata
- Class: Actinopterygii
- Order: Anguilliformes
- Family: Congridae
- Genus: Gavialiceps
- Species: G. arabicus

Binomial name
- Gavialiceps arabicus (D'Ancona, 1928)

Synonyms
- Leptocephalus arabicus D'Ancona, 1928

Species of fish

Gavialiceps arabicus is an eel in the family Muraenesocidae (pike congers). It was described by Umberto D'Ancona in 1928, originally under the genus Leptocephalus. It is a marine, deep water-dwelling eel which is known from the western Indian Ocean, including the Gulf of Aden, the southeastern Arabian Sea, Socotra, Yemen and Maldives. It dwells at a depth range of 380 to 497 metres (1,250 to 1,630 ft). Males can reach a maximum total length of 84 centimetres (2 ft 9 in).
