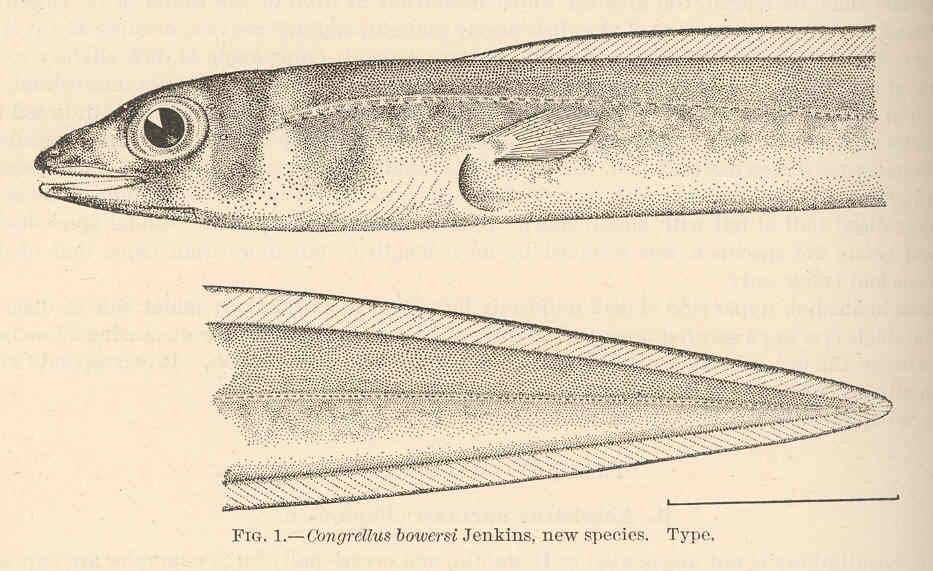
- Large-eye Conger

Conservation status
- Least Concern (IUCN 3.1)

Scientific classification
- Kingdom: Animalia
- Phylum: Chordata
- Class: Actinopterygii
- Order: Anguilliformes
- Family: Congridae
- Genus: Ariosoma
- Species: A. marginatum

Binomial name
- Ariosoma marginatum (Vaillant & Sauvage, 1875)

Synonyms
- Congrogadus marginatus Vaillant & Sauvage, 1875; Congrellus bowersi Jenkins, 1903; Ariosoma bowersi (Jenkins, 1903)

= Large-eye conger =

Species of fish

The large-eye conger (Ariosoma marginatum) is an eel in the family Congridae (conger/garden eels). This fish also goes by the name puhi. Ariosoma marginatum and other conger eels are also called White Eels in the Hawaiian Islands. It was described by Léon Vaillant and Henri Émile Sauvage in 1875, originally under the genus Congrogadus. It is a tropical, marine eel which is known from the northwestern and eastern central Pacific Ocean, including Hawaii and the Ladd Seamount.

== Description ==
Ariosoma marginatum typically ranges from very pale brown to pale brown in color dorsally, and white ventrally. It's anal, caudal, and dorsal fin are defined by a narrow black border. The species name, marginatum denotes the blackish margin along the dorsal and anal fins. Males generally reach a maximum total length of 38 centimetres (15 in), though particularly large males will reach 16 in. They have large eyes, roughly equal in length to the snout. Its eyes are encased in a layer of heavy transparent flesh. As with other congrid eels in the genus Ariosoma, the large-eye conger is one of the primary food sources of the Hawaiian monk seal.

== Distribution & Habitat ==
Ariosoma marginatum is endemic to the Hawaiian Islands and Johnston Atoll. The large-eye conger is commonly found in some shallow-water, sandy areas. While the large-eye conger is mainly active at night, swimming in open water, it spends its days hiding under the sand, with only its head visible; if approached, it quickly retreats headfirst beneath the surface. Ariosoma marginatum inhabits the shallows up to a depth of 490 metres (1600 ft), and leads a benthic, nocturnal, sand-dwelling lifestyle.

== Human Use ==
Ariosoma marginatum has been used as a food item by inhabitants of Hawaii, and sold in markets there.
