= Heteroconger congroides =

Conservation status
- Data Deficient (IUCN 3.1)

Scientific classification
- Kingdom: Animalia
- Phylum: Chordata
- Class: Actinopterygii
- Order: Anguilliformes
- Family: Congridae
- Genus: Heteroconger
- Species: H. congroides

Binomial name
- Heteroconger congroides (D'Ancona, 1928)

Synonyms
- Leptocephalus congroides D'Ancona, 1928

Species of fish

Heteroconger congroides is an eel in the family Congridae (conger/garden eels). It was described by Umberto D'Ancona in 1928, originally under the genus Leptocephalus. It is a marine, deepwater-dwelling eel which is known from the Kamaran Islands in Yemen, in the Red Sea, in the western Indian Ocean. It is known only from larvae, which are known from a depth of 522 m (1,710 ft).
