= Gavialiceps =

Scientific classification
- Kingdom: Animalia
- Phylum: Chordata
- Class: Actinopterygii
- Order: Anguilliformes
- Family: Congridae
- Genus: Gavialiceps; Alcock, 1889

Species
- See text

Genus of fishes

Gavialiceps is a genus of eels in the family Congridae, the conger eels.

== Species ==
There are currently five recognized species in this genus:

- Gavialiceps arabicus (D'Ancona, 1928)
- Gavialiceps bertelseni Karmovskaya, 1993
- Gavialiceps javanicus Karmovskaya, 1993 (duckbill conger)
- Gavialiceps taeniola Alcock, 1889
- Gavialiceps taiwanensis (J. S. T. F. Chen & H. T. C. Weng, 1967)
