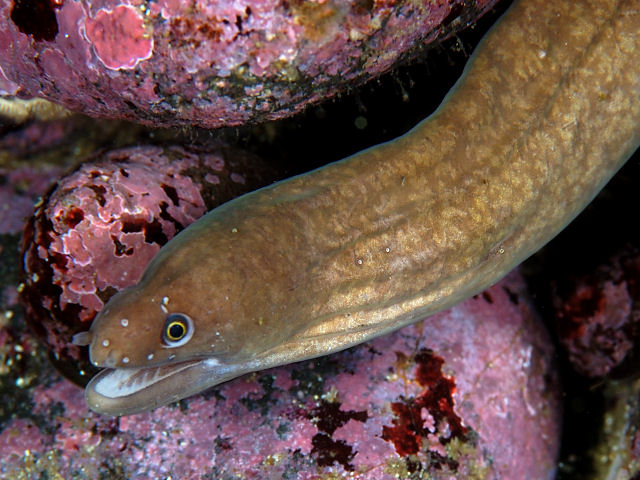
- Anarchias seychellensis

Scientific classification
- Kingdom: Animalia
- Phylum: Chordata
- Class: Actinopterygii
- Order: Anguilliformes
- Family: Muraenidae
- Subfamily: Uropterygiinae
- Genus: Anarchias; D. S. Jordan & Starks, 1906

Type species
- Anarchias allardicei D. S. Jordan & Starks, 1906

Species
- See text.

= Anarchias =

Genus of fishes

Anarchias is a genus of moray eels in the family Muraenidae.

The species in this family are typically characterized by their small stature(length), they’re usually brown, and they tend to reside in coral reefs or rocky regions near shores.

== Species ==
- Anarchias allardicei D. S. Jordan & Starks, 1906 (Allardice's moray) (formerly Anarchias maldiviensis)
- Anarchias cantonensis (L. P. Schultz, 1943) (Canton Island moray)
- Anarchias euryurus (E. H. M. Lea, 1913)
- Anarchias exulatus Reece, D. G. Smith & Holm, 2010
- Anarchias galapagensis (Seale, 1940) (Minute moray)
- Anarchias leucurus (Snyder, 1904) (Snyder's moray)
- Anarchias longicaudis (W. K. H. Peters, 1877)
- Anarchias schultzi Reece, D. G. Smith & Holm, 2010
- Anarchias seychellensis J. L. B. Smith, 1962 (Seychelles moray)
- Anarchias similis (E. H. M. Lea, 1913) (Pygmy moray) (formerly Anarchias grassi and Anarchias yoshiae)
- Anarchias supremus McCosker & A. L. Stewart, 2006
