= Gavialiceps javanicus =

Scientific classification
- Kingdom: Animalia
- Phylum: Chordata
- Class: Actinopterygii
- Order: Anguilliformes
- Family: Congridae
- Genus: Gavialiceps
- Species: G. javanicus

Binomial name
- Gavialiceps javanicus Karmovskaya, 1993

Species of fish

Gavialiceps javanicus, the duckbill conger, is an eel in the family Muraenesocidae (pike congers). It was described by Emma Stanislavovna Karmovskaya in 1993. It is a marine, deep water-dwelling eel which is known from the Indo-West Pacific, including northwestern Australia, Java (from which the species epithet is derived), and Indonesia. It dwells at a depth range of 560–600 metres. Males can reach a maximum total length of 89 centimetres.
