= Gnathophis capensis =

Conservation status
- Least Concern (IUCN 3.1)

Scientific classification
- Kingdom: Animalia
- Phylum: Chordata
- Class: Actinopterygii
- Order: Anguilliformes
- Family: Congridae
- Genus: Gnathophis
- Species: G. capensis

Binomial name
- Gnathophis capensis (Kaup, 1856)

Synonyms
- Leptocephalus capensis Kaup, 1856; Gnatophis capensis (Kaup, 1856) (misspelling); Congermuraena australis Barnard, 1923; Ariosoma australis (Barnard, 1923)

Species of fish

Gnathophis capensis, the Southern Atlantic conger or southern conger, is an eel in the family Congridae (conger/garden eels). It was described by Johann Jakob Kaup in 1856, originally under the genus Leptocephalus. It is a subtropical, marine eel which is known from the southeastern Atlantic Ocean, including from False Bay to Plettenberg Bay, South Africa and also on Tristan da Cunha Island. It is known to dwell at a depth of 100 metres. Males can reach a maximum total length of 37 cm (1 ft 3 in).

The Southern conger is preyed upon by Chelidonichthys queketti, Helicolenus dactylopterus, and Sphyrna zygaena. Its own diet consists of benthic crustaceans.
