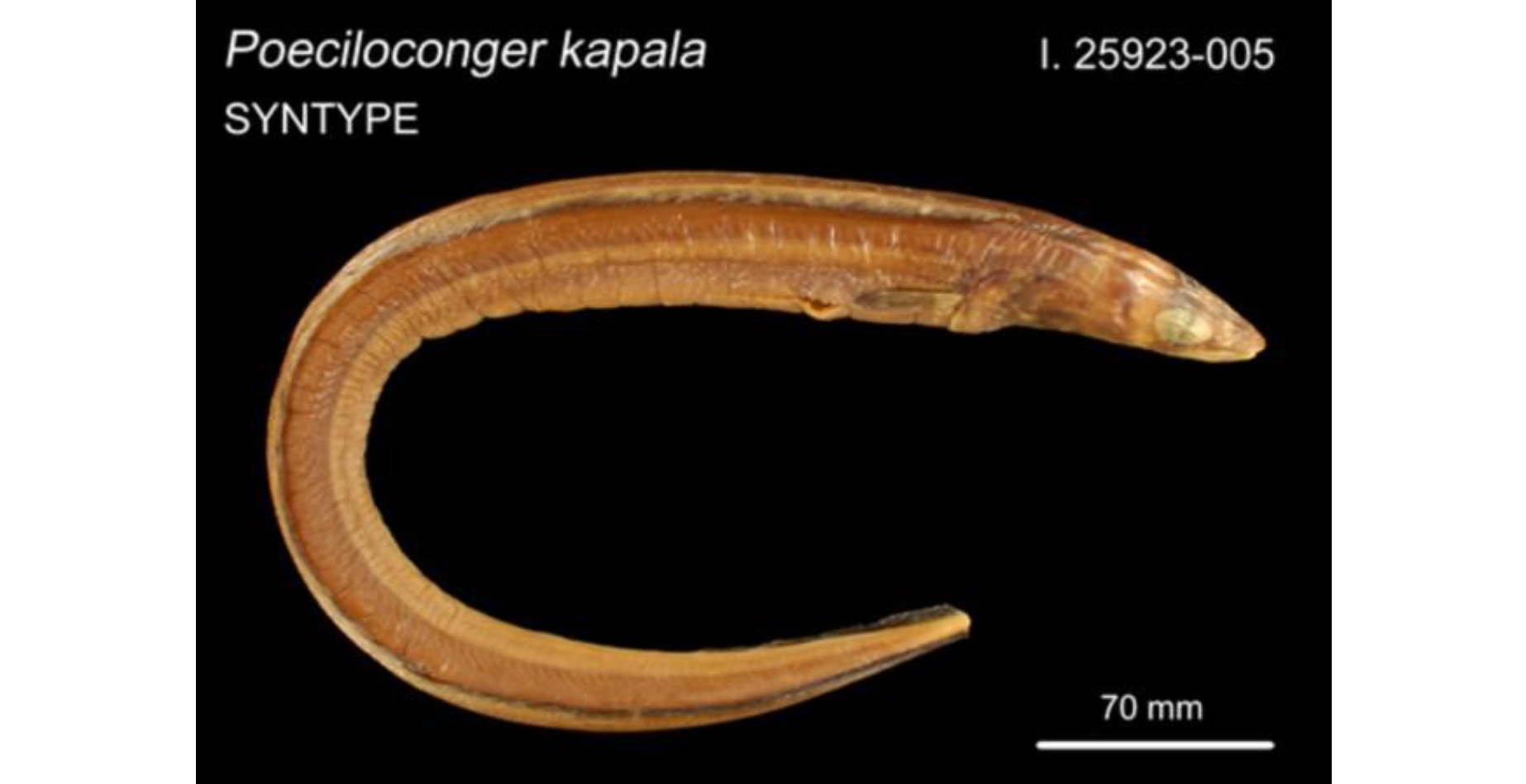
- AM I.25923-005

Conservation status
- Data Deficient (IUCN 3.1)

Scientific classification
- Kingdom: Animalia
- Phylum: Chordata
- Class: Actinopterygii
- Order: Anguilliformes
- Family: Congridae
- Genus: Ariosoma
- Species: A. kapala

Binomial name
- Ariosoma kapala (Castle, 1990)

= Ariosoma kapala =

Species of fish

(AM I.25923-005) Holotype site (off Port Stephens, NSW'"`UNIQ--ref-0000000E-QINU`"'

Ariosoma kapala (common name mottled conger) is an eel in the family Congridae (conger/garden eels). It was first described in 1990 by Peter H. J. Castle as Poeciloconger kapala. The holotype was collected by the New South Wales Fisheries Research Vessel Kapala on April 11, 1985, during a bottom trawl at a depth of 46–64 m. The species was named for the FRV Kapala. In 1998, Shieh-Chieh Shen moved the species to the genus Ariosoma.

It is a benthic species, endemic to the east coast of Australia and found in the neritic zone.
