= Gavialiceps bertelseni =

Scientific classification
- Kingdom: Animalia
- Phylum: Chordata
- Class: Actinopterygii
- Order: Anguilliformes
- Family: Congridae
- Genus: Gavialiceps
- Species: G. bertelseni

Binomial name
- Gavialiceps bertelseni Karmovskaya, 1993

Species of fish

Gavialiceps bertelseni is an eel in the family Muraenesocidae (pike congers). It was described by Emma Stanislavovna Karmovskaya in 1993. It is a marine, deep water-dwelling eel which is known from the southwestern slope of Madagascar, in the western Indian Ocean. It dwells at a depth range of 670 to 1,200 metres (2,200 to 3,940 ft). Males can reach a maximum total length of 84 centimetres (33 in).

The species epithet was given in memory of ichthyologist Erik Bertelsen.

== Names ==
In Hindi the word ''Gavialiceps'' is translated as gavial and Bertelseni is named in memory of Erik Bertelsen.

== Description ==
Color is dark-black. Dorsal and anal fin are dark in the caudal sections of the body. The gill and mouth cavities are dark but does not show through the skin.

== Distribution ==
This species of eel is found in Western Indian Ocean in south-western Madagascar.
