= Ophichthus echeloides =

Conservation status
- Data Deficient (IUCN 3.1)

Scientific classification
- Kingdom: Animalia
- Phylum: Chordata
- Class: Actinopterygii
- Order: Anguilliformes
- Family: Ophichthidae
- Genus: Ophichthus
- Species: O. echeloides

Binomial name
- Ophichthus echeloides (D'Ancona, 1928)

Synonyms
- Leptocephalus echeloides D'Ancona, 1928

Species of fish

Ophichthus echeloides is an eel in the family Ophichthidae (worm/snake eels). It was described by Umberto D'Ancona in 1928. It is a marine, tropical eel which is known from the Gulf of Aqaba and the Red Sea, in the western Indian Ocean. Males can reach a maximum total length of 51 centimetres (20 in).
