= Anarchias galapagensis =

Scientific classification
- Domain: Eukaryota
- Kingdom: Animalia
- Phylum: Chordata
- Class: Actinopterygii
- Order: Anguilliformes
- Family: Muraenidae
- Genus: Anarchias
- Species: A. galapagensis

Binomial name
- Anarchias galapagensis (Seale 1940)

Synonyms
- Uropterygius galapagensis Seale 1940

Species of fish

Anarchias galapagensis is a moray eel commonly known as the Minute moray or the Hardtail moray. It was first named by Alvin Seale in 1940 and is found in coral reefs from the Gulf of California to Colombia. At a maximum length of 14 cm, it is regarded as one of the smallest morays worldwide.
