= Anarchias longicaudis =

Scientific classification
- Domain: Eukaryota
- Kingdom: Animalia
- Phylum: Chordata
- Class: Actinopterygii
- Order: Anguilliformes
- Family: Muraenidae
- Genus: Anarchias
- Species: A. longicaudis

Binomial name
- Anarchias longicaudis (W. K. H. Peters, 1877)

Synonyms
- Muraena longicauda W. K. H. Peters, 1877

Species of fish

Anarchias longicaudis is a moray eel found in the eastern-central Atlantic Ocean. It was first named by Peters in 1877.
