= Ariosoma dolichopterum =

Scientific classification
- Kingdom: Animalia
- Phylum: Chordata
- Class: Actinopterygii
- Order: Anguilliformes
- Family: Congridae
- Genus: Ariosoma
- Species: A. dolichopterum

Binomial name
- Ariosoma dolichopterum Karmovskaya, 2015

Species of fish

Ariosoma dolichopterum is a species of fish found in Central Vietnam. It has about 127–131 vertebrae. It is closely related to A. anago and 30 specimens were seized upon its description.
