= Bernard Séret =

French ichthyologist and marine biologist (born 1949)

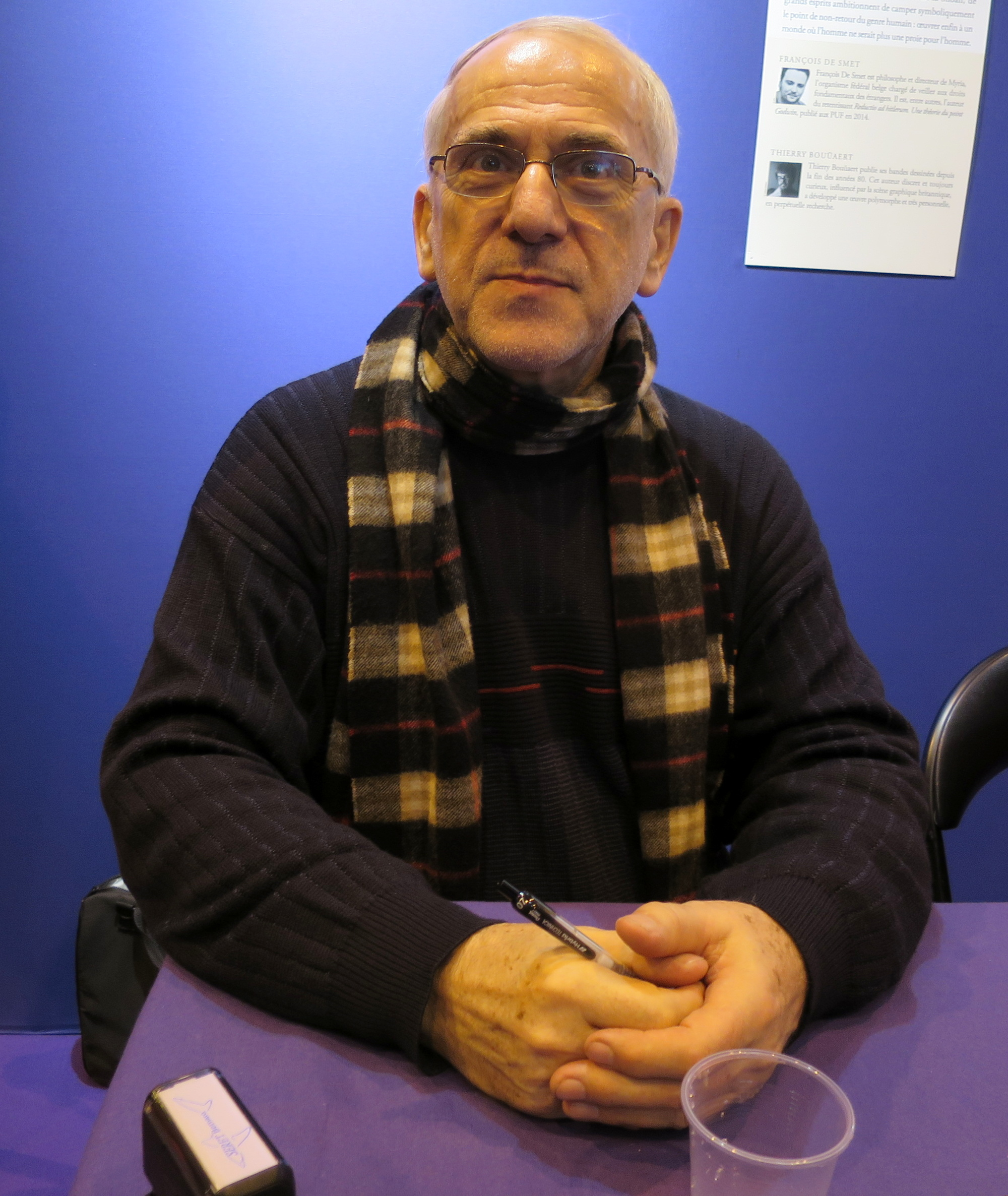
- Séret in 2016
- Born: 1949 (age 76–77)
- Known for: Research on cartilaginous fish (sharks, rays, and chimaeras)
- Scientific career
- Fields: Ichthyology, marine biology
- Workplaces: Institut de recherche pour le développement Muséum national d'histoire naturelle

Bernard Séret (born 1949) is a French ichthyologist and marine biologist. He specializes in cartilaginous fish, including sharks, rays, and chimaeras.

== Biography ==
Séret earned a Diplôme d'études approfondies (DEA) in biological oceanography and completed a doctoral dissertation revising the suborder Rhinobatoidei within the Batoidea. Between 1975 and 1978, he was a project leader at the Centre national pour l’exploitation des océans (CNEXO), followed by service at the Office de la recherche scientifique et technique outre-mer (ORSTOM) until 1983, and later at the ichthyology laboratory of the Muséum national d'histoire naturelle (MNHN). Overall, he worked for nearly forty years at the Institut de recherche pour le développement (IRD) and for more than twenty years in the Department of Systematics and Evolution at the Muséum national d'histoire naturelle in Paris. Since retiring in 2015, he has continued his scientific and consulting activities.

His research concerns the taxonomy, ecobiology, fisheries, and conservation of cartilaginous fishes. He has described more than seventy new species and published more than 180 scientific papers, including approximately 120 on cartilaginous fishes. In 1998, he participated in the development of the Food and Agriculture Organization's international plan of action for the conservation and management of shark populations. He is the French representative in the International Council for the Exploration of the Sea (ICES) working group on elasmobranchs and serves as an expert for the French Ministry of the Environment on international conventions, including CITES, the Convention on Migratory Species (CMS), and OSPAR. He is a member of the IUCN SSC Shark Specialist Group and was scientific director of the European Elasmobranch Association until 2014, having been a founding member in 1996. Séret has also participated in the European projects MADE (Mitigating adverse ecological impacts of open ocean fisheries) and CPOA-Shark (Provision of scientific advice for the implementation of the Community Plan of Action for sharks). He has led a programme on the sharks of the Îles Éparses in the southwestern Indian Ocean. His books include Poissons de mer de l’ouest africain tropical (1981), Les Requins des côtes françaises (1999), Les Requins (2001), Guide d’identification des principales espèces de requins et de raies de l’Atlantique tropical oriental (2006), Guide des requins, des raies et des chimères des pêches françaises (2010), and Les Requins: Les Connaître Pour Les Comprendre (2016). In the same year, he contributed to Rays of the World by Peter R. Last.

Séret's interest in shark fisheries includes analyses of French shark fishery data in European waters, studies of shark bycatch in French tuna fisheries in collaboration with IRD fisheries biologists, and the training of fishery observers in the identification of sharks and rays. His work on shark conservation also includes assessments for French and European institutions as well as international organizations. He has also been involved in the analysis of shark attacks and has served as an adviser on this subject.

Séret has conducted several scientific expeditions and participated in exploratory cruises in the Atlantic Ocean, the Southern Ocean, and the South Pacific Ocean.

In 2000, Bernard Séret became involved in a controversy concerning a falsified photograph of a coelacanth. Together with his co-authors, he attempted in a paper published in Nature to demonstrate that a photograph taken in 1995 provided evidence for the existence of the Indonesian coelacanth. The image was subsequently shown to be an obvious forgery derived from a photograph published by Mark V. Erdmann in 1998. Séret acknowledged that one of his co-authors, George Serre, had supplied the manipulated photograph. Although the incident attracted attention within the scientific community, Séret continued his career until retirement.

== Eponyms ==
The species Ariosoma sereti Karmovskaya, 2004, Callionymus sereti Fricke, 1998, Coelorinchus sereti Iwamoto & Merrett, 1997, Gymnura sereti Yokota & Carvalho, 2017, Lepidapedon sereti Bray, Faliex, Allienne & Mouahid, 2013, Lepidotrigla sereti del Cerro & Lloris, 1997, Neobythites sereti Nielsen, 2002, and Notoraja sereti White, Last & Mana, 2017 were named in his honour.

== Taxa described by Bernard Séret ==
(Complete list omitted here for brevity; retain the original list from the German article.)

== Selected publications ==
- Poissons de mer de l’ouest africain tropical (1981)
- Les Requins des côtes françaises (1999)
- Les Requins (2001)
- Guide d’identification des principales espèces de requins et de raies de l’Atlantique tropical oriental (2006)
- Guide des requins, des raies et des chimères des pêches françaises (2010)
- Les Requins: Les Connaître Pour Les Comprendre (2016)
