= Ariosoma ophidiophthalmus =

Conservation status
- Data Deficient (IUCN 3.1)

Scientific classification
- Kingdom: Animalia
- Phylum: Chordata
- Class: Actinopterygii
- Order: Anguilliformes
- Family: Congridae
- Genus: Ariosoma
- Species: A. ophidiophthalmus

Binomial name
- Ariosoma ophidiophthalmus Karmovskaya, 1991

Species of fish

Ariosoma ophidiophthalmus is an eel in the family Congridae (conger/garden eels). It was described by Emma Stanislavovna Karmovskaya in 1991. It is a tropical, marine eel which is known from the Say de Malha Bank in the western Indian Ocean. It is known to dwell at a depth range of 110–115 metres.

The species epithet "ophidiophthalmus" is derived from a Latinized version of the Ancient Greek words "ophis" and "ophthalmus", and refers to the snake-like appearance of the eel's eyes.
