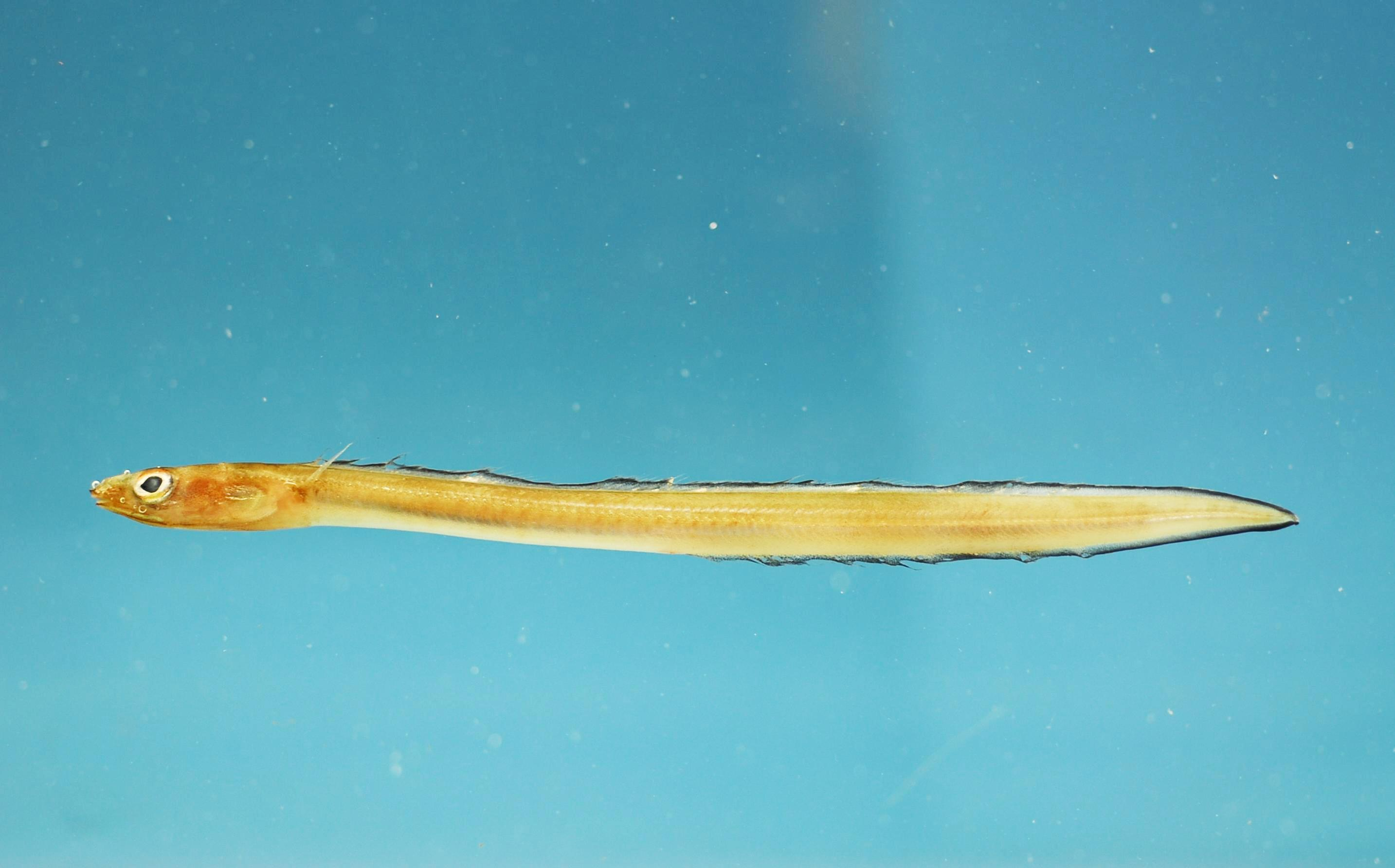
- Ariosoma selenops

Scientific classification
- Kingdom: Animalia
- Phylum: Chordata
- Class: Actinopterygii
- Order: Anguilliformes
- Family: Congridae
- Subfamily: Bathymyrinae
- Genus: Ariosoma; Swainson, 1838

Type species
- Ophisoma acuta Swainson, 1839

Synonyms
- Ophisoma Swainson, 1839; Anguilla (Ophisoma) Swainson, 1839

= Ariosoma =

Genus of fishes

Ariosoma is a genus of marine congrid eels.

== Species ==
There are 42 species currently recognized in this genus by Eschmeyer's Catalog of Fishes:

- Ariosoma albimaculatum Kodeeswaran, Dash, Kumar & Lal, 2022
- Ariosoma anago (Temminck & Schlegel, 1846) (Silvery conger)
- Ariosoma anagoides (Bleeker, 1853) (Sea conger)
- Ariosoma anale (Poey, 1860) (Longtrunk conger) (syn. Ariosoma analis)
- Ariosoma balearicum (Delaroche, 1809) (Band-tooth conger) (syn. Ariosoma impressa, Ariosoma minor)
- Ariosoma bauchotae Karrer, 1982
- Ariosoma bengalense Ray, Acharya, Khatua, Roy, Mohapatra & Mishra, 2022
- Ariosoma bowersi (Jenkins, 1903) (large-eye conger) (syn. Ariosoma marginatum (Vaillant & Sauvage, 1875))
- Ariosoma coquettei D. G. Smith & Kanazawa, 1977
- Ariosoma dolichopterum Karmovskaya, 2015
- Ariosoma emmae Smith & Ho, 2018
- Ariosoma fasciatum (Günther, 1872) (Barred conger) (syn. Ariosoma nancyae)
- Ariosoma gilberti (J. D. Ogilby, 1898) (Gilbert's garden eel)
- Ariosoma gnadanossi Talwar & Mukherjee, 1977
- Ariosoma gracile Kodeeswaran, Kathirvelpandian, Mohapatra, Kumar & Sarkar, 2024
- Ariosoma hemiaspidus Wade, 1946
- Ariosoma howense (McCulloch & Waite, 1916) (Lord Howe conger)
- Ariosoma indicum Kodeeswaran, Kathirvelpandian, Acharya, Mohanty, Mohapatra, Kumar & Lal, 2022
- Ariosoma kannani Kodeeswaran, Kathirvelpandian, Ray, Kumar, Mohapatra & Sarkar, 2024
- Ariosoma kapala (Castle, 1990)
- Ariosoma majus (Asano, 1958)
- Ariosoma mauritianum (Pappenheim, 1914) (Blunt-tooth conger)
- Ariosoma maurostigma Kodeeswaran, Mohapatra, Dhinakaran, Kumar & Lal, 2022
- Ariosoma meeki (D. S. Jordan & Snyder, 1900)
- Ariosoma megalops Fowler, 1938
- Ariosoma melanospilos Kodeeswaran, Jayakumar, Akash, Kumar & Lal, 2021
- Ariosoma mellissii (Günther, 1870) (Silver eel)
- Ariosoma multivertebratum Karmovskaya, 2004
- Ariosoma nigrimanum Norman, 1939
- Ariosoma obud Herre, 1923
- Ariosoma ophidiophthalmus Karmovskaya, 1991
- Ariosoma opistophthalmum (Ranzani, 1839)
- Ariosoma sanzoi (D'Ancona, 1928)
- Ariosoma sazonovi Karmovskaya, 2004
- Ariosoma scheelei (Strömman, 1896) (Tropical conger)
- Ariosoma selenops Reid, 1934
- Ariosoma sereti Karmovskaya, 2004
- Ariosoma shiroanago (Asano, 1958)
- Ariosoma sokotranum Karmovskaya, 1991
- Ariosoma somaliense Kotthaus, 1968
- Ariosoma tamilicum Kodeeswaran, Acharya, Mohapatra & Kumar, 2025
- Ariosoma thoothukudiense Kodeeswaran, Kathirvelpandian, Mohapatra & Kumar, 2024

=== Former Species ===
Species formerly categorized as Ariosoma, that are now listed under a different genus:

- Ariosoma bleekeri (Fowler, 1934) - now known as Bathycongrus bleekeri
- Ariosoma guttulata (Günther, 1887) - now known as Bathycongrus guttulatus (lined conger)
- Ariosoma mystax (Delaroche, 1809) - now known as Gnathophis mystax (thinlip conger)
- Ariosoma prorigerum (C. H. Gilbert, 1891) - now known as Japonoconger proriger (slope conger)
