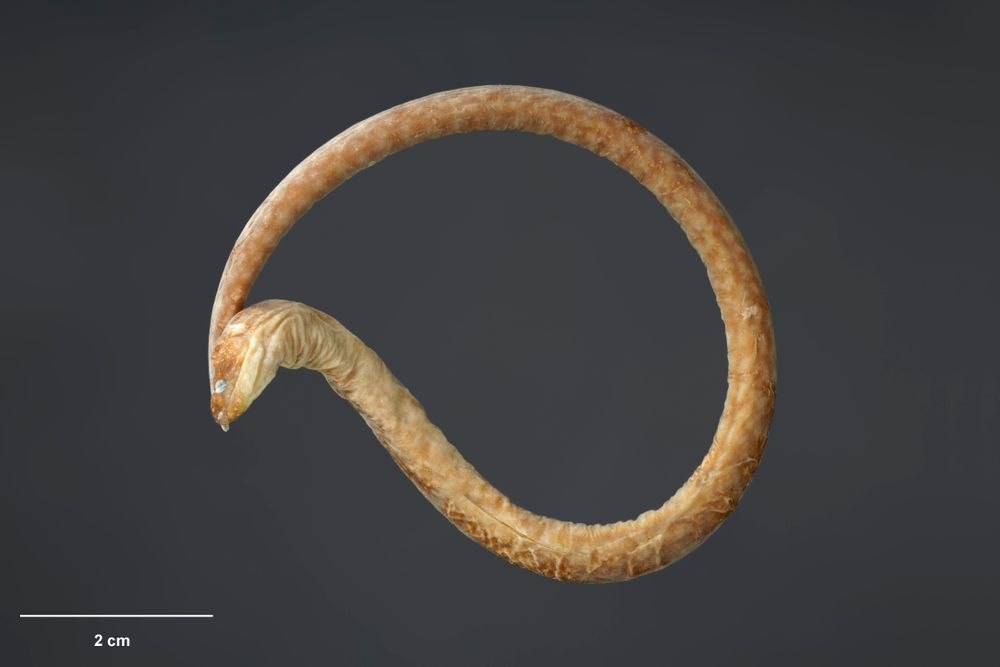
- Holotype of Anarchias supremus

Scientific classification
- Kingdom: Animalia
- Phylum: Chordata
- Class: Actinopterygii
- Order: Anguilliformes
- Family: Muraenidae
- Genus: Anarchias
- Species: A. supremus

Binomial name
- Anarchias supremus McCosker & Stewart, 2006

= Anarchias supremus =

Species of fish

Anarchias supremus is an eel in the family Muraenidae (moray eels). It was described by John E. McCosker and Andrew L. Stewart in 2006. It is a subtropical, marine eel which is known from Macauley Island on the Kermadec Ridge in the southwestern Pacific Ocean. Males are known to reach a maximum total length of 19.1 centimetres.

The species epithet is derived from the Latin word for "supreme/uppermost", acknowledging Anarchias supremus's possession of the most vertebrae of any known species in the genus.
