= Halimuraenoides =

Conservation status
- Data Deficient (IUCN 3.1)

Scientific classification
- Kingdom: Animalia
- Phylum: Chordata
- Class: Actinopterygii
- Order: Blenniiformes
- Family: Pseudochromidae
- Subfamily: Congrogadinae
- Genus: Halimuraenoides
- Species: H. isostigma

Binomial name
- Halimuraenoides isostigma Maugé & Bardach, 1985

Genus of fishes

Halimuraenoides is a monotypy genus of ray-finned fishes, classified under the subfamily Congrogadinae, the eel blennies, part of the dottyback family, Pseudochromidae. The single species in the genus, Halimuraenoides isostigma, is known only from the south-western tip of Madagascar.
