= Ariosoma sokotranum =

Conservation status
- Least Concern (IUCN 3.1)

Scientific classification
- Kingdom: Animalia
- Phylum: Chordata
- Class: Actinopterygii
- Order: Anguilliformes
- Family: Congridae
- Genus: Ariosoma
- Species: A. sokotranum

Binomial name
- Ariosoma sokotranum Karmovskaya, 1991

Species of fish

Ariosoma sokotranum is an eel in the family Congridae (conger/garden eels). It was described by Emma Stanislavovna Karmovskaya. It is a marine, deep water-dwelling eel which is known from Sokotra Island (from which its species epithet is derived), in the western Indian Ocean.

== Info ==
Ariosoma Sokotranum is a bathydemersal marine eel, usually found between 395-420 meters below the water's surface. Ariosoma Sokotranum was discovered in 1991 by Emma Stanislavovna Karmovskaya. She described it as a new species of conger eel (congridae). Arisoma Sokotranum can only be found in the western Indian Ocean. The Ariosoma has between 136 - 141 vertebrae with a dark edge along the unpaired fins and light-coloured pectoral fins, with the branchial chamber in the region of the operculum dark. Ariosoma Sokotranum's dorsal fin originates slightly anterior to the base of the pectorals.
