= Sea conger =

Conservation status
- Data Deficient (IUCN 3.1)

Scientific classification
- Kingdom: Animalia
- Phylum: Chordata
- Class: Actinopterygii
- Order: Anguilliformes
- Family: Congridae
- Genus: Ariosoma
- Species: A. anagoides

Binomial name
- Ariosoma anagoides (Bleeker, 1853)

Synonyms
- Conger anagoides Bleeker, 1853; Alloconger anagoides (Bleeker, 1853)

Species of fish

The sea conger (Ariosoma anagoides), also known as the big-eye conger, is an eel in the family Congridae (conger/garden eels). It was described by Pieter Bleeker in 1853, originally under the genus Conger. It is a tropical, marine eel which is known from the western Pacific Ocean, including Kanagawa Prefecture, Japan; the eastern China Sea, and the East Indies. It leads a benthic lifestyle and dwells in sand and mud. Males can reach a maximum total length of 51 centimeters.
