= Ariosoma obud =

Conservation status
- Data Deficient (IUCN 3.1)

Scientific classification
- Kingdom: Animalia
- Phylum: Chordata
- Class: Actinopterygii
- Order: Anguilliformes
- Family: Congridae
- Genus: Ariosoma
- Species: A. obud

Binomial name
- Ariosoma obud Herre, 1923

Species of fish

Ariosoma obud is an eel in the family Congridae (conger/garden eels). It was described by Albert William Herre in 1923. It is a tropical, marine eel which is known from the Philippines, in the western central Pacific Ocean.

The species epithet "obud" refers to the Visayan language term for leptocephalid eels.
