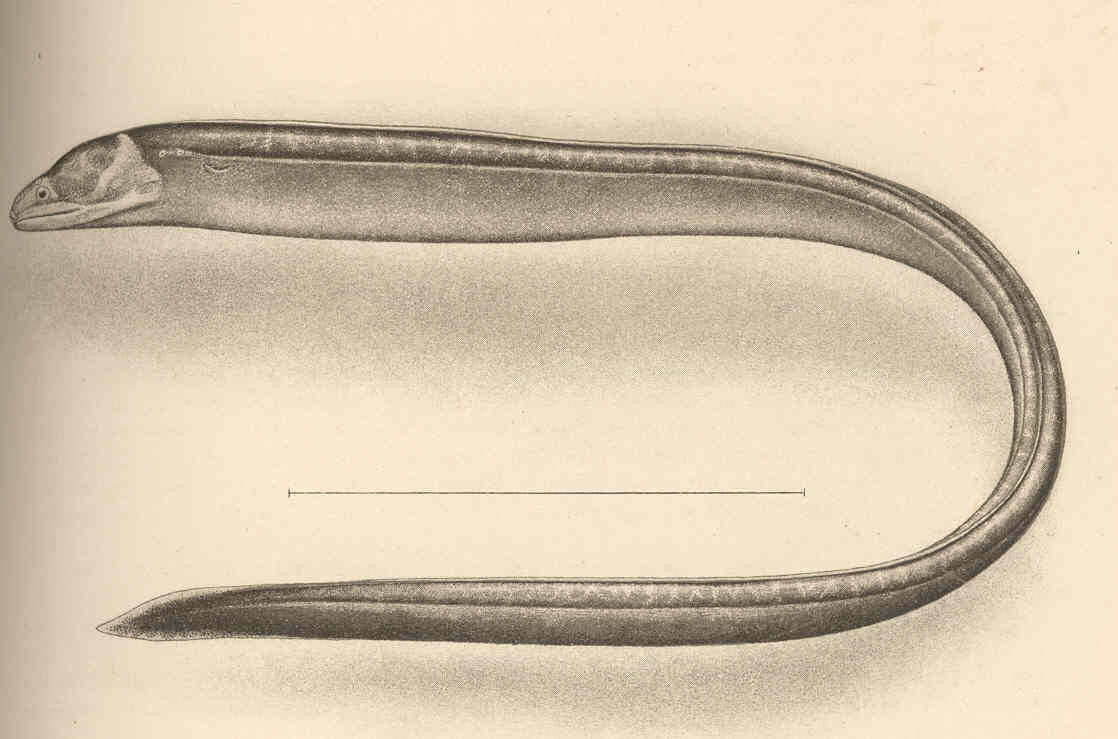

Scientific classification
- Domain: Eukaryota
- Kingdom: Animalia
- Phylum: Chordata
- Class: Actinopterygii
- Order: Anguilliformes
- Family: Muraenidae
- Genus: Anarchias
- Species: A. leucurus

Binomial name
- Anarchias leucurus (Snyder, 1904)

Synonyms
- Uropterygius leucurus Snyder, 1904

= Anarchias leucurus =

Species of fish

Anarchias leucurus is a moray eel found in the Pacific Ocean. It was first named by Snyder in 1904 as Uropterygius leucurus, and is commonly known as Snyder's moray, the fine-spotted moray or the finespot moray. It is thought to be the smallest species of moray, and may actually represent several different species or subspecies.
