= Blackedge conger =

Conservation status
- Data Deficient (IUCN 3.1)

Scientific classification
- Kingdom: Animalia
- Phylum: Chordata
- Class: Actinopterygii
- Order: Anguilliformes
- Family: Congridae
- Genus: Bathycongrus
- Species: B. retrotinctus

Binomial name
- Bathycongrus retrotinctus (Jordan & Snyder, 1901)

Synonyms
- Leptocephalus retrotinctus Jordan & Snyder, 1901; Rhechias retrotincta (Jordan & Snyder, 1901); Bathycongrus randalli Ben-Tuvia, 1993

Species of fish

The Blackedge conger (Bathycongrus retrotinctus, also known as the Randall's conger) is an eel in the family Congridae (conger/garden eels). It was described by David Starr Jordan and John Otterbein Snyder in 1901, originally under the genus Leptocephalus. It is a marine, deep water-dwelling eel which is known from Japan to the Philippines, in the western Pacific Ocean. It dwells at a depth range of 150–450 metres (490–1,480 ft). Males can reach a maximum total length of 54 centimetres (1 ft 9 in).
