= Rhynchoconger ectenurus =

Conservation status
- Least Concern (IUCN 3.1)

Scientific classification
- Kingdom: Animalia
- Phylum: Chordata
- Class: Actinopterygii
- Order: Anguilliformes
- Family: Congridae
- Genus: Rhynchoconger
- Species: R. ectenurus

Binomial name
- Rhynchoconger ectenurus (D. S. Jordan & R. E. Richardson, 1909)

Synonyms
- Leptocephalus ectenurus Jordan & Richardson, 1909; Rhynchocymba ectenura (Jordan & Richardson, 1909)

Species of fish

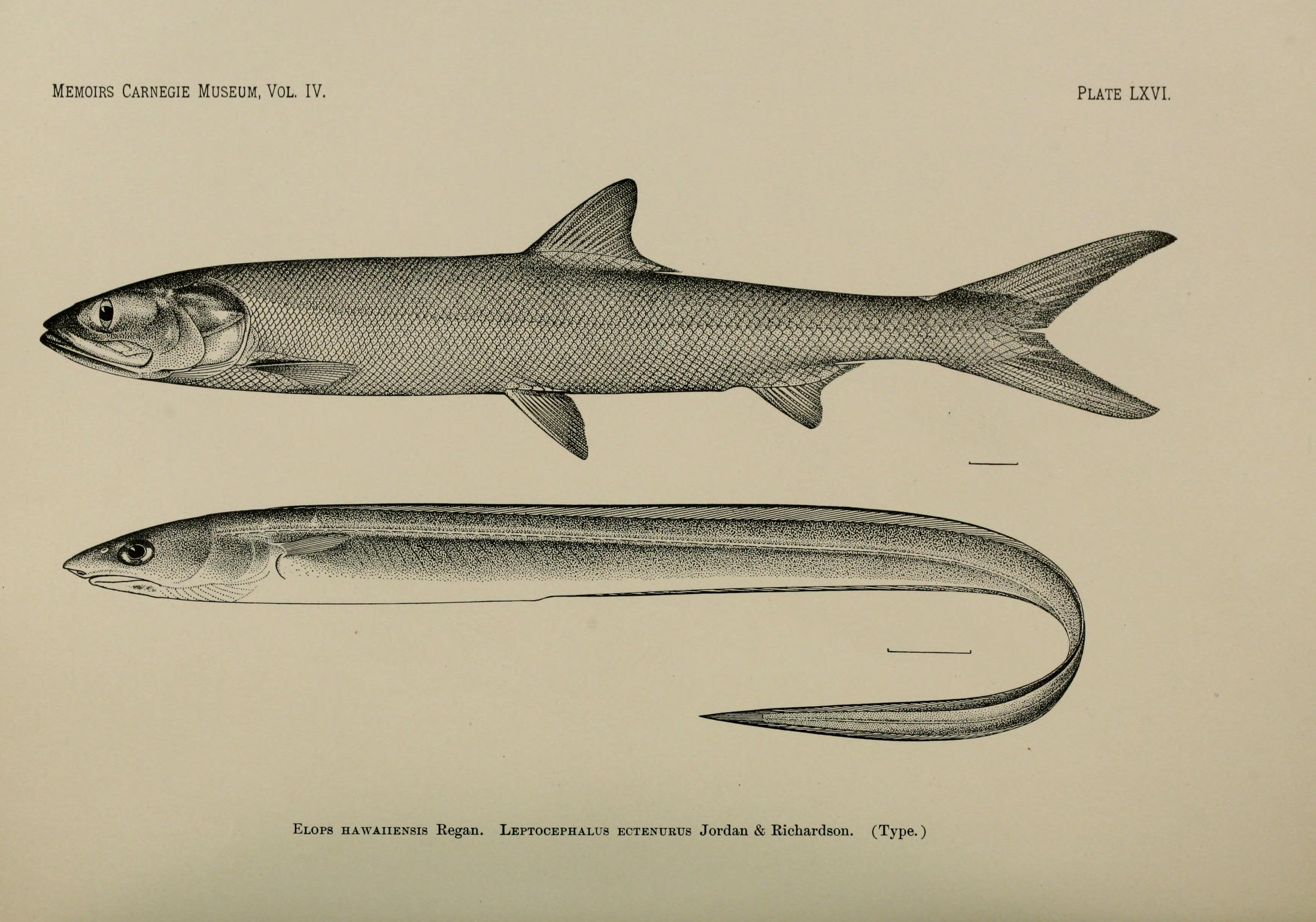
Elops hawaiensis (above) & Rhynchoconger ectenurus (below)

Rhynchoconger ectenurus, known commonly as the longnose conger in Australia, is an eel in the family Congridae (conger/garden eels). It was described by David Starr Jordan in Robert Earl Richardson in 1909, originally under the genus Leptocephalus. It is a marine, subtropical eel which is known from the western Pacific Ocean, including northern Australia, Japan, the Korean Peninsula, and the eastern China Sea. It inhabits soft sediments on the continental shelf and slope. Males can reach a maximum total length of 65 centimetres (26 in; 2.13 ft).
