= Facciolella saurencheloides =

Conservation status
- Least Concern (IUCN 3.1)

Scientific classification
- Kingdom: Animalia
- Phylum: Chordata
- Class: Actinopterygii
- Order: Anguilliformes
- Family: Nettastomatidae
- Genus: Facciolella
- Species: F. saurencheloides

Binomial name
- Facciolella saurencheloides (D'Ancona, 1928)

Synonyms
- Leptocephalus saurencheloides D'Ancona, 1928

Species of fish

Facciolella saurencheloides is an eel in the family Nettastomatidae (duckbill/witch eels). It was described by Umberto D'Ancona in 1928. It is a marine, deep water-dwelling eel which is known from the northwestern and western Indian Ocean, including the Red Sea. It dwells at a depth range of 700–2,000 metres (2,300–6,560 ft).
