= Ariosoma meeki =

Conservation status
- Least Concern (IUCN 3.1)

Scientific classification
- Kingdom: Animalia
- Phylum: Chordata
- Class: Actinopterygii
- Order: Anguilliformes
- Family: Congridae
- Genus: Ariosoma
- Species: A. meeki

Binomial name
- Ariosoma meeki (Jordan & Snyder, 1900)

Synonyms
- Congrellus meeki Jordan & Snyder, 1900; Ariosome meeki (Jordan & Snyder, 1900) (misspelling)

Species of fish

Ariosoma meeki is an eel in the family Congridae (conger/garden eels). It was described by David Starr Jordan and John Otterbein Snyder in 1900, originally under the genus Congrellus. It is a subtropical, marine eel which is known from Japan and the Peng-hu Islands, in the northwestern Pacific Ocean. Males are known to reach a maximum total length of 53 centimetres.

Named in honor of ichthyologist Seth Eugene Meek (1859-1914), who first recognized the distinctiveness of this species.
