= Anarchias exulatus =

Scientific classification
- Domain: Eukaryota
- Kingdom: Animalia
- Phylum: Chordata
- Class: Actinopterygii
- Order: Anguilliformes
- Family: Muraenidae
- Genus: Anarchias
- Species: A. exulatus

Binomial name
- Anarchias exulatus Reece, Smith & Holm, 2010

Species of fish

Anarchias exulatus is an eel in the family Muraenidae (moray eels). It was described by Joshua S. Reece, David G. Smith, and Erling Holm in 2010. It is a subtropical, marine eel which is known from the Hawaiian Islands, Johnston Atoll, Rapa, Gambier, Pitcairn Island, and the Tonga Islands. It is an uncommon species which dwells in coral reefs and rocky regions near shores, and has been reported at a depth of 12 metres. Males are known to reach a maximum total length of 29.3 centimetres.

The species epithet "exulatus" means "exiled/banished" in Latin, referring to the species' restriction to outskirts of the faunal region in the Indo-West Pacific.
