= Ariosoma shiroanago =

Conservation status
- Least Concern (IUCN 3.1)

Scientific classification
- Kingdom: Animalia
- Phylum: Chordata
- Class: Actinopterygii
- Order: Anguilliformes
- Family: Congridae
- Genus: Ariosoma
- Species: A. shiroanago

Binomial name
- Ariosoma shiroanago (Asano, 1958)

Synonyms
- Alloconger shiroanago shiroanago Asano, 1958; Ariosoma shiroanago shiroanago (Asano, 1958)

Species of fish

Ariosoma shiroanago is an eel in the family Congridae (conger/garden eels). It was described by Hirotoshi Asano in 1958, originally under the genus Alloconger. It is a marine, temperate water-dwelling eel which is known from the northwestern Pacific Ocean, including Japan, South Korea, and Taiwan. It leads a benthic lifestyle and inhabits rough sand on continental shelves. Males can reach a maximum total length of 40 centimetres.
