= Ariosoma coquettei =

Conservation status
- Least Concern (IUCN 3.1)

Scientific classification
- Kingdom: Animalia
- Phylum: Chordata
- Class: Actinopterygii
- Order: Anguilliformes
- Family: Congridae
- Genus: Ariosoma
- Species: A. coquettei

Binomial name
- Ariosoma coquettei D. G. Smith & Kanazawa, 1977

Species of fish

Ariosoma coquettei is an eel in the family Congridae (conger/garden eels). It was described by David G. Smith and Robert H. Kanazawa in 1977. It is a tropical, marine eel which is known from the northern coast of South America, in the western central Atlantic Ocean. It is known to dwell at a maximum depth of 75 meters. It can reach a maximum total length of 28.1 centimeters.

The species epithet "coquettei" refers to the name of the vessel which collected the first specimens of the eel.
