= Ariosoma nigrimanum =

Conservation status
- Data Deficient (IUCN 3.1)

Scientific classification
- Kingdom: Animalia
- Phylum: Chordata
- Class: Actinopterygii
- Order: Anguilliformes
- Family: Congridae
- Genus: Ariosoma
- Species: A. nigrimanum

Binomial name
- Ariosoma nigrimanum Norman, 1939

Synonyms
- Ariosoma nigrimanus Norman, 1939 (misspelling)

Species of fish

Ariosoma nigrimanum is an eel in the family Congridae (conger/garden eels). It was described by John Roxborough Norman in 1939. It is a tropical, marine eel which is known from the Gulf of Aden, in the western Indian Ocean. It is known to dwell at a maximum depth of 220 metres. Males can reach a maximum total length of 33.5 centimetres.
