= Facciolella karreri =

Conservation status
- Least Concern (IUCN 3.1)

Scientific classification
- Kingdom: Animalia
- Phylum: Chordata
- Class: Actinopterygii
- Order: Anguilliformes
- Family: Nettastomatidae
- Genus: Facciolella
- Species: F. karreri

Binomial name
- Facciolella karreri Klausewitz, 1995

Species of fish

Facciolella karreri is an eel in the family Nettastomatidae (duckbill/witch eels). It was described by Wolfgang Klausewitz in 1995. It is a marine, deep water-dwelling eel which is known from the eastern and western Indian Ocean and the western central Pacific Ocean, including the Red Sea, Egypt, Eritrea, Somalia, Saudi Arabia, Yemen and Sudan, and possibly northern Australia. It dwells at a depth range of 700–2000 metres, and is believed to inhabit holes in soft sediments on the sea-bottom. Males can reach a maximum total length of 36.1 centimetres.

== Etymology ==
The species epithet "karreri" refers to Christine Karrer, and was given to honour her contributions to the knowledge of eels and other deep-sea fishes from the western Indian Ocean. Due to a lack of known threats or observed decline in population, and an estimated unlikelihood of such occurrences, the IUCN redlist currently lists F. karreri as Least Concern.
