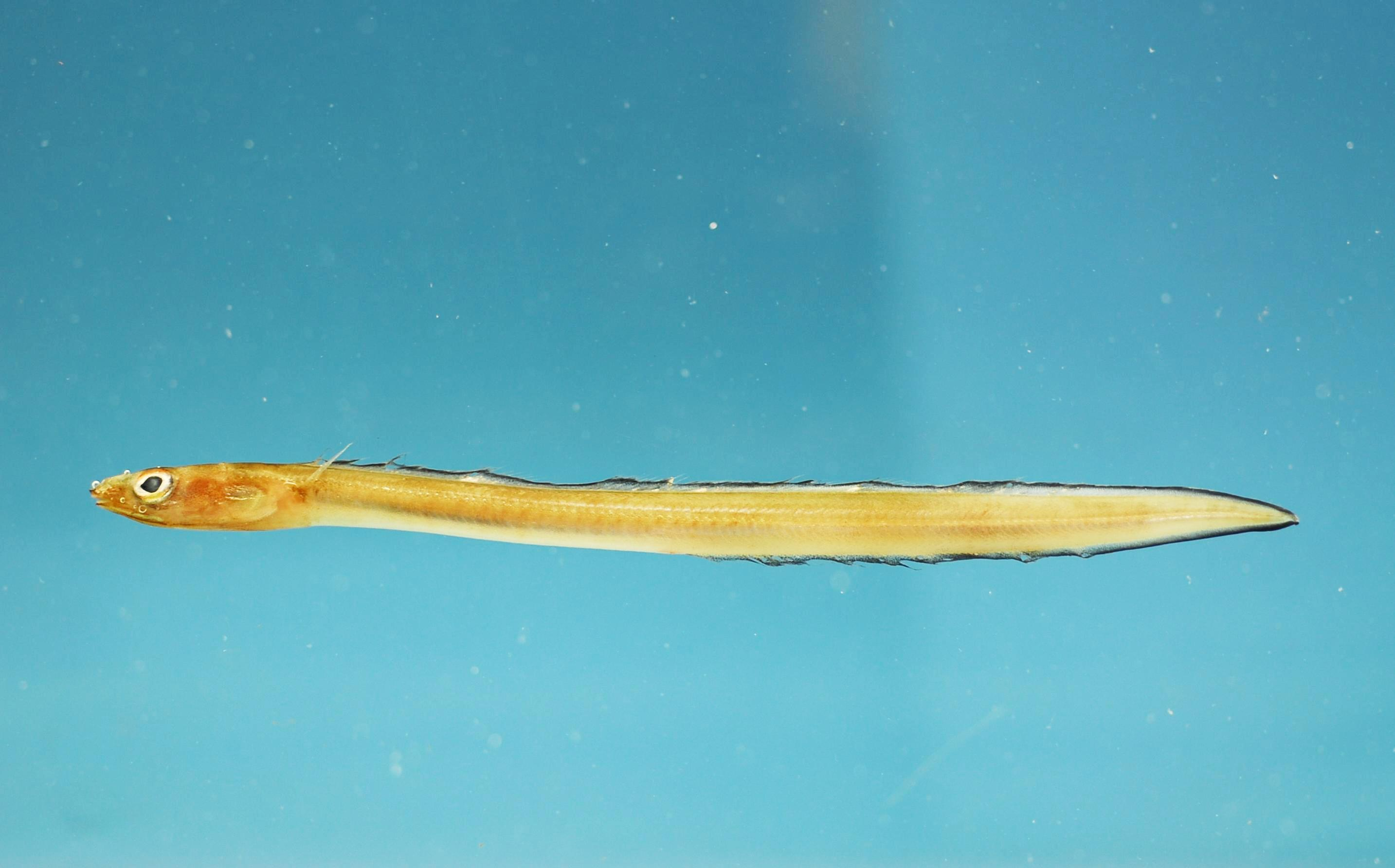

Conservation status
- Least Concern (IUCN 3.1)

Scientific classification
- Kingdom: Animalia
- Phylum: Chordata
- Class: Actinopterygii
- Order: Anguilliformes
- Family: Congridae
- Genus: Ariosoma
- Species: A. selenops

Binomial name
- Ariosoma selenops Reid, 1934

= Ariosoma selenops =

Species of fish

Ariosoma selenops is an eel in the family Congridae (conger/garden eels). It was described by Earl Desmond Reid in 1934. It is a marine, deep water-dwelling eel which is known from the northwestern, southwestern, and western central Atlantic Ocean, including Antigua and Barbuda, the Bahamas, Brazil, Dominica, the Dominican Republic, Canada, Haiti, Grenada, Guadeloupe, Martinique, Puerto Rico, Jamaica, Saint Vincent and the Grenadines, Saint Lucia, the United States, and Venezuela. It is known to dwell at a depth range of 348–549 metres.

Due to the widespread distribution of the species, and doubts over its chances of undergoing a population decline caused by man-made pollution (in lieu of its deep-water nature), the IUCN redlist currently lists Ariosoma selenops as Least Concern.
