= Haliophis =

Scientific classification
- Kingdom: Animalia
- Phylum: Chordata
- Class: Actinopterygii
- Order: Blenniiformes
- Family: Pseudochromidae
- Subfamily: Congrogadinae
- Genus: Haliophis; Rüppell, 1829

Type species
- Muraena guttata Forsskål 1775

Genus of fishes

Haliophis is a genus of ray-finned fishes, the type genus of the subfamily Congrogadinae, the eel blennies, part of the dottyback family, Pseudochromidae. They are found in the Indian Ocean and in the western Pacific Ocean.

== Species ==
The following species are classified in the genus Halidesmus:

- Haliophis aethiopus Winterbottom, 1985 (Bali eelblenny)
- Haliophis diademus Winterbottom & Randall, 1994 (Stars-and-stripes snakelet )
- Haliophis guttatus (Forsskål, 1775) (African eel blenny)
