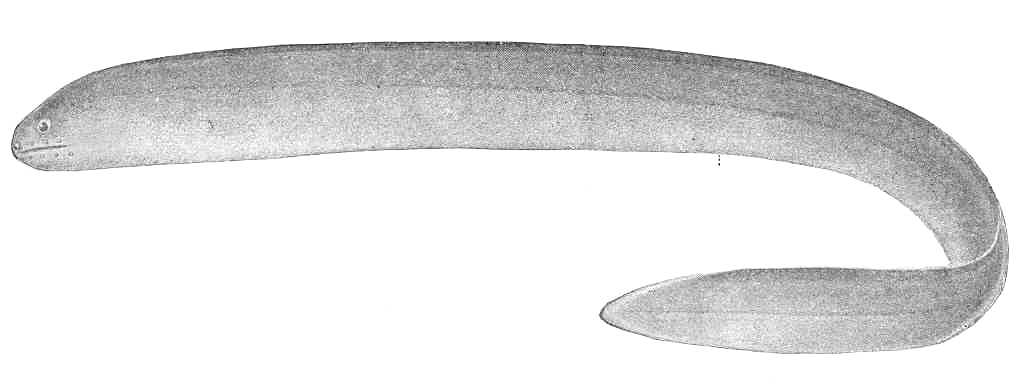

Scientific classification
- Kingdom: Animalia
- Phylum: Chordata
- Class: Actinopterygii
- Order: Anguilliformes
- Family: Muraenidae
- Genus: Anarchias
- Species: A. allardicei

Binomial name
- Anarchias allardicei D. S. Jordan & Starks in Jordan & Seale, 1906

Synonyms
- Anarchias maldiviensis Klausewitz, 1964

= Anarchias allardicei =

Species of fish

Anarchias allardicei is a moray eel commonly known as the Allardice's moray. It is light brown in color, and is found in coral reefs in the Pacific and Indian Oceans.
