= Facciolella castlei =

Conservation status
- Data Deficient (IUCN 3.1)

Scientific classification
- Kingdom: Animalia
- Phylum: Chordata
- Class: Actinopterygii
- Order: Anguilliformes
- Family: Nettastomatidae
- Genus: Facciolella
- Species: F. castlei

Binomial name
- Facciolella castlei Parin & Karmovskaya, 1985

Species of fish

Facciolella castlei is an eel in the family Nettastomatidae (duckbill/witch eels). It was described by Nikolai Vasilyevich Parin and Emma Stanislavovna Karmovskaya in 1985. It is a marine, deep water-dwelling eel which is known from Chile, in the southeastern Pacific Ocean. The type specimen was retrieved from a depth of 230 metres.
