= Ariosoma sereti =

Conservation status
- Least Concern (IUCN 3.1)

Scientific classification
- Kingdom: Animalia
- Phylum: Chordata
- Class: Actinopterygii
- Order: Anguilliformes
- Family: Congridae
- Genus: Ariosoma
- Species: A. sereti

Binomial name
- Ariosoma sereti Karmovskaya, 2004

Species of fish

Ariosoma sereti is an eel in the family Congridae (conger/garden eels). It was described by Emma Stanislavovna Karmovskaya in 2004. It is a marine, deep water-dwelling eel which is known from the Marquesas Islands, in the eastern central Pacific Ocean. It is known to dwell at a depth range of 95–370 metres. Females can reach a maximum total length of 26.5 centimetres.

The species epithet was given in honour of Bernard Séret. (b. 1949), Muséum national d'Histoire naturelle (Paris), for "significant" contributions to the study and collection of deepwater fishes, and for giving Karmovskaya the opportunity to study his material on eels.
