= Rusichthys =

Scientific classification
- Kingdom: Animalia
- Phylum: Chordata
- Class: Actinopterygii
- Order: Blenniiformes
- Family: Pseudochromidae
- Subfamily: Congrogadinae
- Genus: Rusichthys; Winterbottom, 1979

Type species
- Rusichthys plesiomorphus Winterbottom 1979

Genus of fishes

Rusichthys is a genus of ray-finned fishes, classified under the subfamily Congrogadinae, the eel blennies, part of the dottyback family, Pseudochromidae, from the western Indian Ocean. The generic name is a compound of the acronym RUSI which stands for Rhodes University Smith Institute and thus honours the South African ichthyologist James Leonard Brierley Smith

== Species ==
The following species are classified in the genus Rusichthys:

- Rusichthys explicitus Winterbottom, 1996
- Rusichthys plesiomorphus Winterbottom, 1979
