= Bathycongrus trilineatus =

Conservation status
- Data Deficient (IUCN 3.1)

Scientific classification
- Kingdom: Animalia
- Phylum: Chordata
- Class: Actinopterygii
- Order: Anguilliformes
- Family: Congridae
- Genus: Bathycongrus
- Species: B. trilineatus

Binomial name
- Bathycongrus trilineatus (Castle, 1964)

Synonyms
- Leptocephalus trilineatus Castle, 1964; Bathyuroconger trilineatus (Castle, 1964)

Species of fish

Bathycongrus trilineatus is an eel in the family Congridae (conger/garden eels). It was described by Peter Henry John Castle in 1964, originally under the genus Leptocephalus. It is a tropical, marine eel which is known from the western central Pacific Ocean. It is known to dwell at a depth of 50 metres.
