= Natalichthys =

Scientific classification
- Kingdom: Animalia
- Phylum: Chordata
- Class: Actinopterygii
- Order: Blenniiformes
- Family: Pseudochromidae
- Subfamily: Congrogadinae
- Genus: Natalichthys; Winterbottom, 1980

Type species
- Natalichthys ori Winterbottom 1980

Genus of fishes

Natalichthys is a genus of ray-finned fishes, classified under the subfamily Congrogadinae, the eel blennies, part of the dottyback family, Pseudochromidae. They are found in the western Indian Ocean off the eastern coast of South Africa, the genus being named after Natal, where all three species in the genus are so far restricted to.

== Species ==
The following species are classified in the genus Natalichthys:

- Natalichthys leptus Winterbottom, 1980 (Pencil snakelet)
- Natalichthys ori Winterbottom, 1980 (Natal snakelet)
- Natalichthys sam Winterbottom, 1980 (Nail snakelet)
