= Ariosoma multivertebratum =

Conservation status
- Data Deficient (IUCN 3.1)

Scientific classification
- Kingdom: Animalia
- Phylum: Chordata
- Class: Actinopterygii
- Order: Anguilliformes
- Family: Congridae
- Genus: Ariosoma
- Species: A. multivertebratum

Binomial name
- Ariosoma multivertebratum Karmovskaya, 2004

Species of fish

Ariosoma multivertebratum is an eel in the family Congridae (conger/garden eels). It was described by Emma Stanislavovna Karmovskaya in 2004. It is a marine, deep water-dwelling eel which is known from the Marquesas Islands, in the eastern central Pacific Ocean. It is known to dwell at a depth range of 300–460 metres. Males can reach a maximum total length of 54.2 centimetres.

The species epithet "multivertebratum" refers to the eel's possession of a larger quantity of vertebrae than others in the genus Ariosoma.
