= Ariosoma sazonovi =

Conservation status
- Data Deficient (IUCN 3.1)

Scientific classification
- Kingdom: Animalia
- Phylum: Chordata
- Class: Actinopterygii
- Order: Anguilliformes
- Family: Congridae
- Genus: Ariosoma
- Species: A. sazonovi

Binomial name
- Ariosoma sazonovi Karmovskaya, 2004

Species of fish

Ariosoma sazonovi is an eel in the family Congridae (conger/garden eels). It was described by Emma Stanislavovna Karmovskaya in 2004. It is a marine, deep water-dwelling eel which is known from the Philippines, in the western Pacific Ocean. It is known to dwell at a depth range of 160–440 metres. Females can reach a maximum total length of 39.5 centimetres.

The species epithet was given in honour of Yurii Sazonov.
