= Anarchias schultzi =

Scientific classification
- Domain: Eukaryota
- Kingdom: Animalia
- Phylum: Chordata
- Class: Actinopterygii
- Order: Anguilliformes
- Family: Muraenidae
- Genus: Anarchias
- Species: A. schultzi

Binomial name
- Anarchias schultzi Reece, Smith & Holm, 2010

Species of fish

Anarchias schultzi is an eel in the family Muraenidae (moray eels). It was described by Joshua S. Reece, David G. Smith, and Erling Holm in 2010. It is a tropical, marine eel which is known from the western Pacific Ocean, including the Caroline Islands, the Solomon Islands New Caledonia, and the Tonga Islands. It is an uncommon species which dwells at a depth range of 8–14 metres, in coral reefs and rocky regions near shores. Males are known to reach a maximum total length of 15.9 centimetres.

The species epithet honours American ichthyologist Leonard Peter Schultz.
