= Halimuraena =

Scientific classification
- Kingdom: Animalia
- Phylum: Chordata
- Class: Actinopterygii
- Order: Blenniiformes
- Family: Pseudochromidae
- Subfamily: Congrogadinae
- Genus: Halimuraena; J. L. B. Smith, 1952

Type species
- Halimuraena hexagonata J. L. B. Smith, 1952

Genus of fishes

Halimuraena is a genus of ray-finned fishes, classified under the subfamily Congrogadinae, the eel blennies, part of the dottyback family, Pseudochromidae. They are found in the western Indian Ocean as far east as the Mascarene Islands, and north to Kenya, although the centre of the genus's distribution appears to be around Madagascar and the Mozambique Channel.

== Species ==
The following species are classified in the genus Halimuraena:

- Halimuraena hexagonata J. L. B. Smith, 1952
- Halimuraena lepopareia Winterbottom, 1980
- Halimuraena shakai Winterbottom, 1978 (Zulu snakelet)
