= Dogface witch eel =

Conservation status
- Least Concern (IUCN 3.1)

Scientific classification
- Kingdom: Animalia
- Phylum: Chordata
- Class: Actinopterygii
- Order: Anguilliformes
- Family: Nettastomatidae
- Genus: Facciolella
- Species: F. equatorialis

Binomial name
- Facciolella equatorialis (Gilbert, 1891)

Synonyms
- Chlopsis equatorialis Gilbert, 1891

Species of fish

The dogface witch eel (Facciolella equatorialis) is an eel in the family Nettastomatidae (duckbill/witch eels). It was described by Charles Henry Gilbert in 1891. It is a marine, deep water-dwelling eel which is known from the eastern central Pacific Ocean, including Point Conception, California; Panama, Guadalupe, and the Galapagos Islands. The fish is known to dwell at an approximate depth of 734 meters. Males can reach a maximum total length of 90 centimetres.

The color is uniformly brown.

The dogface witch eel's diet consists primarily of small deep-water crustaceans. To humans, it is considered harmless.
