= Conger erebennus =

Conservation status
- Least Concern (IUCN 3.1)

Scientific classification
- Kingdom: Animalia
- Phylum: Chordata
- Class: Actinopterygii
- Order: Anguilliformes
- Family: Congridae
- Genus: Conger
- Species: C. erebennus

Binomial name
- Conger erebennus (Jordan & Snyder, 1901)

Synonyms
- Leptocephalus erebennus Jordan & Snyder, 1901

Species of fish

Conger erebennus is an eel in the family Congridae (conger/garden eels). It was described by David Starr Jordan and John Otterbein Snyder in 1901, originally under the genus Leptocephalus. It is a marine, temperate water-dwelling eel which is known from Japan and the Korean Peninsula, in the northwestern Pacific Ocean. It is also called the "anaconda" アナコンダ ("marine anaconda") in Tokyo, Japan.

Conger erebennus can grow to 134 cm (53 in) in total length.
