= Ariosoma opistophthalmum =

Conservation status
- Least Concern (IUCN 3.1)

Scientific classification
- Kingdom: Animalia
- Phylum: Chordata
- Class: Actinopterygii
- Order: Anguilliformes
- Family: Congridae
- Genus: Ariosoma
- Species: A. opistophthalmum

Binomial name
- Ariosoma opistophthalmum (Ranzani, 1839)

Synonyms
- Conger opistophthalmus Ranzani, 1839; Ariosoma opistophthalmus (Ranzani, 1839)

Species of fish

Ariosoma opistophthalmum is an eel in the family Congridae (conger/garden eels). It was described by Camillo Ranzani in 1839, originally under the genus Conger. It is a rare, non-migratory marine, deep water-dwelling eel which is known from the southwestern Atlantic Ocean around Brazil, where it ranges from Bahia to São Paulo. It is known to dwell at a depth range of 110–600 metres. Males can reach a maximum total length of 27.2 centimetres.
