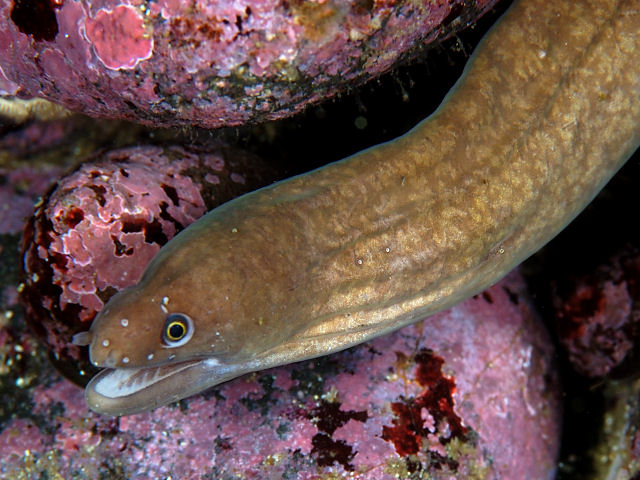

Conservation status
- Least Concern (IUCN 3.1)

Scientific classification
- Kingdom: Animalia
- Phylum: Chordata
- Class: Actinopterygii
- Order: Anguilliformes
- Family: Muraenidae
- Genus: Anarchias
- Species: A. seychellensis

Binomial name
- Anarchias seychellensis J. L. B. Smith, 1962

Synonyms
- Anarchias leucurus non Snyder, 1904

= Anarchias seychellensis =

Species of fish

Anarchias seychellensis is a moray eel found in coral reefs in the Pacific and Indian Oceans. It was first named by J. L. B. Smith Smith in 1962, and is commonly known as the Seychelles moray or the marbled reef-eel.

== Distribution and habitat ==
It is found in depths of 0–35 metres (0–115 ft) in tropical habitats.
