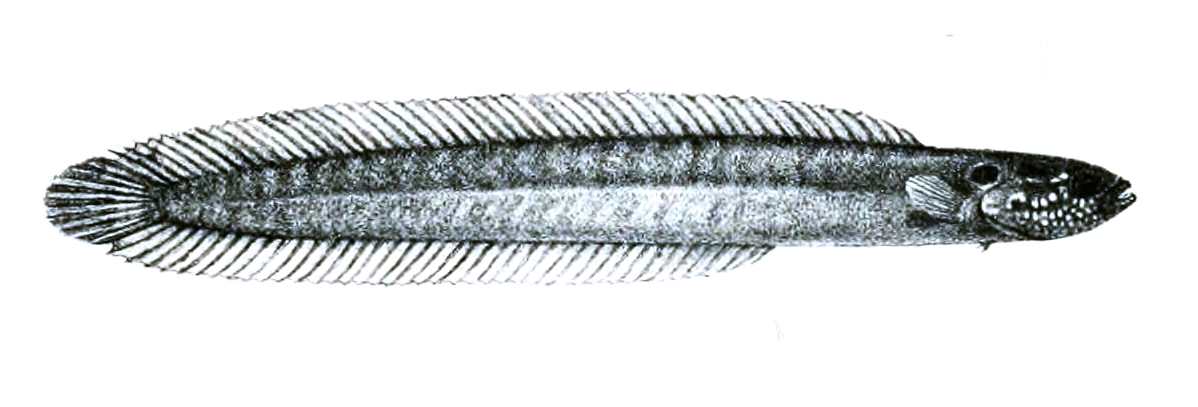

Conservation status
- Least Concern (IUCN 3.1)

Scientific classification
- Kingdom: Animalia
- Phylum: Chordata
- Class: Actinopterygii
- Division: Teleostei
- Order: Blenniiformes
- Family: Pseudochromidae
- Subfamily: Congrogadinae
- Genus: Blennodesmus; Günther, 1872
- Species: B. scapularis

Binomial name
- Blennodesmus scapularis Günther, 1872

= Ocellate eel blenny =

Species of fish

The ocellate eel blenny (Blennodesmus scapularis) is a species of ray-finned fish from the subfamily Congrogadidae, which is in the family Pseudochromidae. It is the only species in the monospecific genus Blennodesmus. It is found along the northern coasts of Australia, from Western Australia, along the coast of the Northern Territory to Queensland. The ocellate eel blenny is found among coral rubble and occurs in intertidal pools up to a depth of 3 metres (9.8 ft) where it feeds mostly on crustaceans. Like other species of Congrogadid the ocellate eel blenny has eggs covered in hooks, cross shaped hooks in this species. This species has an extremely elongated body, its gill membranes are joineded to the isthmus ventrally. It has one, short lateral line which runs from its shoulder to underneath the front part of the dorsal fin. The body is dark brown in colour with mottled with paler markings and it has a black eyespot, smaller than its eye, located above the opercle. It grows to a maximum length of 8.9 centimetres (3.5 in) standard length.
