= Gavialiceps taiwanensis =

Scientific classification
- Domain: Eukaryota
- Kingdom: Animalia
- Phylum: Chordata
- Class: Actinopterygii
- Order: Anguilliformes
- Family: Congridae
- Genus: Gavialiceps
- Species: G. taiwanensis

Binomial name
- Gavialiceps taiwanensis (Chen & Weng, 1967)

Synonyms
- Chlopsis taiwanensis Chen & Weng, 1967

Species of fish

Gavialiceps taiwanensis is an eel in the family Muraenesocidae (pike congers). It was described by Johnson T. F. Chen and Herman Ting-Chen Weng in 1967, originally under the genus Chlopsis. It is a marine, deep water-dwelling eel which is known from the northwestern Pacific Ocean, including Taiwan (from which its species epithet is derived) and Okinawa, Japan. It dwells at a depth range of 600 to 750 metres (1,970 to 2,460 ft). Males can reach a maximum total length of 75.7 centimetres (29.8 in).
