= Longtrunk conger =

Conservation status
- Least Concern (IUCN 3.1)

Scientific classification
- Kingdom: Animalia
- Phylum: Chordata
- Class: Actinopterygii
- Order: Anguilliformes
- Family: Congridae
- Genus: Ariosoma
- Species: A. anale

Binomial name
- Ariosoma anale (Poey, 1860)

Synonyms
- Conger analis Poey, 1860; Ariosoma analis (Poey, 1860)

Species of fish

The longtrunk conger (Ariosoma anale), also known as the short-tail conger, is an eel in the family Congridae (conger/garden eels). It was described by Felipe Poey in 1860, originally under the genus Conger. It is a tropical, marine eel which is known from the western and eastern Atlantic Ocean, including southern Florida, Panama, the Guianas, and the Gulf of Guinea. It leads a benthic lifestyle, and inhabits sand and rock at a depth range of 11–63 meters. Males can reach a maximum total length of 36.3 centimeters.
