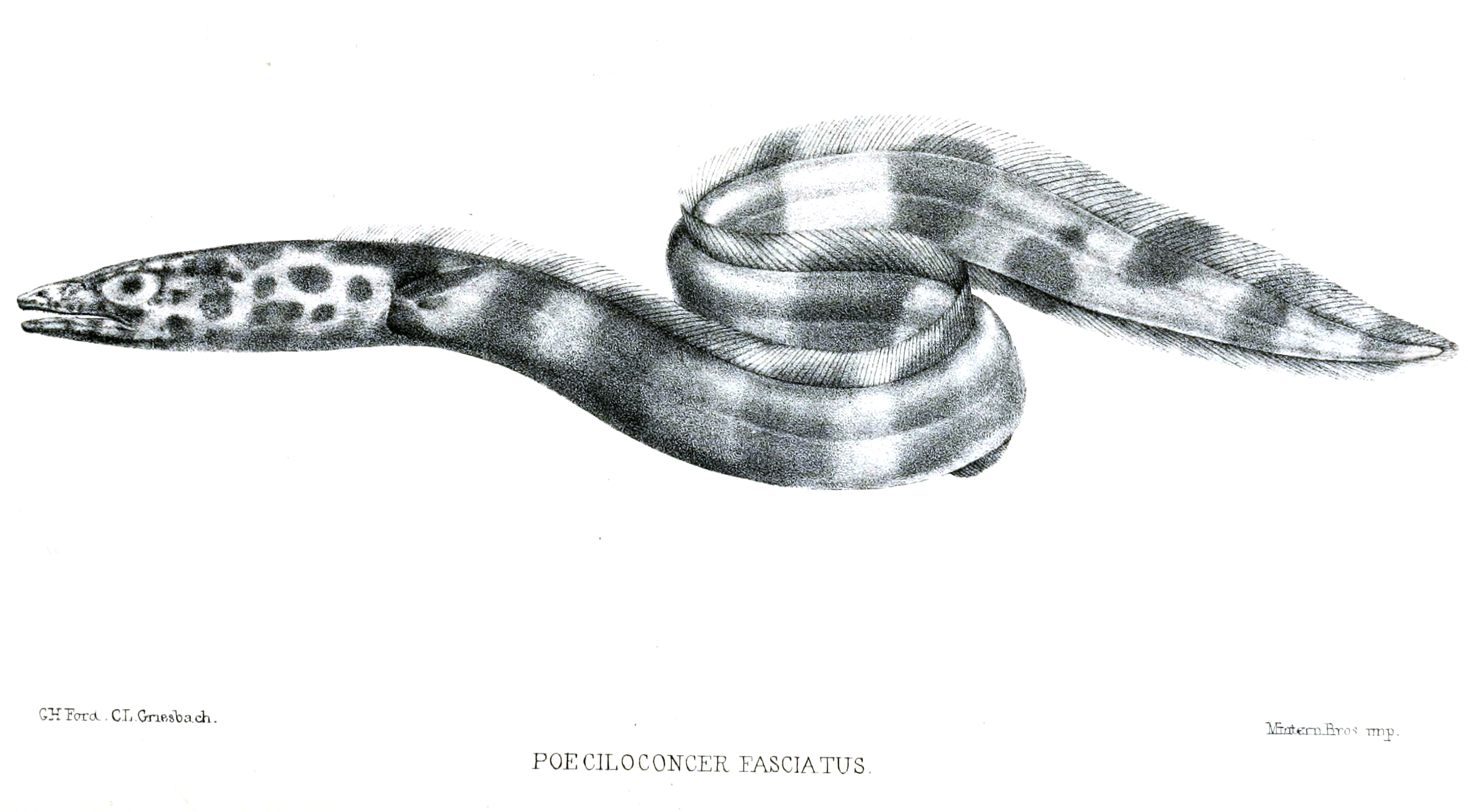

Scientific classification
- Domain: Eukaryota
- Kingdom: Animalia
- Phylum: Chordata
- Class: Actinopterygii
- Order: Anguilliformes
- Family: Congridae
- Genus: Ariosoma
- Species: A. fasciatus

Binomial name
- Ariosoma fasciatus (Günther, 1872)

Synonyms
- Ariosoma nancyae Shen, 1998; Poeciloconger fasciatum Günther, 1872

= Barred conger =

Species of fish

The barred conger (Ariosoma fasciatum) is a species of conger eel that lives in the tropical western and central Indo-Pacific region. It is also known as the barred sand conger. It is a bottom-dwelling fish and is found in the waters around Madagascar, Indonesia, the Marshall Islands, Hawaii and Tahiti and some other island groups.

== Description ==
The barred conger is a slender, nearly cylindrical elongated fish which becomes laterally compressed towards the tail. It grows to a length of about 60 centimetres (24 in) and has robust pectoral fins. It has large gill slits immediately in front of the pectoral fin origins. It has between 154 and 159 vertebrae and a long, narrow dorsal fin that runs almost the whole length of the body. The small caudal fin is stiffened and adapted for rapid reverse burrowing into the substrate. The barred conger has a well-developed lateral line and no scales. It is a whitish fish with about twelve irregular dark brown bars on the body and many small dark spots on the head. The dorsal fin has further prominent barring and spotting.

== Distribution and habitat ==
The barred conger is native to the Indo-Pacific Ocean. Its range includes Madagascar, Indonesia, Taiwan, Sulawesi, the Marshall Islands, the Society Islands, Hawaii and Tahiti. It is found on the seabed where it burrows into sand in lagoons and on reef flats at depths ranging between 10 and 50 m (33 and 164 ft). It spends the day buried and emerges at night to forage.
