= Gavialiceps taeniola =

Scientific classification
- Kingdom: Animalia
- Phylum: Chordata
- Class: Actinopterygii
- Order: Anguilliformes
- Family: Congridae
- Genus: Gavialiceps
- Species: G. taeniola

Binomial name
- Gavialiceps taeniola Alcock, 1889

Synonyms
- Nettastoma taeniola (Alcock, 1889); Saurenchelys taeniola (Alcock, 1889)

Species of fish

Gavialiceps taeniola is an eel in the family Muraenesocidae (pike congers). It was described by Alfred William Alcock in 1889. It is a marine, deep water-dwelling eel which is known from the Indian Ocean, including the Arabian Sea, Oman, and the Bay of Bengal. It dwells at a depth range of 350 to 1,046 metres (1,148 to 3,432 ft). Males can reach a maximum total length of 64.7 centimetres (25.5 in).
