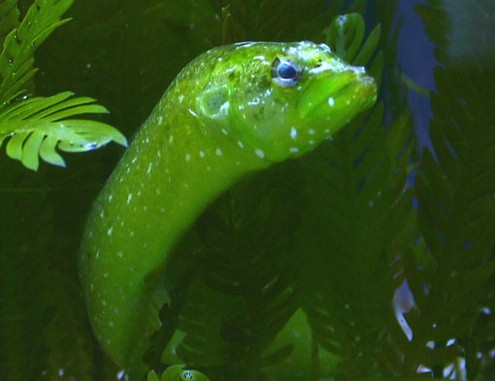
- Congrogadus subducens

Scientific classification
- Kingdom: Animalia
- Phylum: Chordata
- Class: Actinopterygii
- Order: Blenniiformes
- Family: Pseudochromidae
- Subfamily: Congrogadinae
- Genus: Congrogadus; Günther, 1862

Type species
- Machaerium subducens Richardson, 1843

Synonyms
- Congrogadoides Borodin, 1933; Hierichthys D.S. Jordan & Fowler, 1902; Machaerium Richardson, 1843; Pilbaraichthys A. C. Gill, Mooi & Hutchins, 2000; Stenophus Castelnau, 1875

= Congrogadus =

Genus of fishes

Congrogadus is a genus of ray-finned fishes, the type genus of the subfamily Congrogadinae, the eel blennies, part of the dottyback family, Pseudochromidae. The genus Congrogadus has an Indo-Pacific distribution.

== Characteristics ==
The species in the genus Congrogadus differ from their other genera in the subfamily Congogadinae in that they do not have a spot on their shoulder, a similar spot being located on the operculum. Their dorsal and anal fins have a higher number of rays than all the other species in the subfamily except for the species in the genus Halidesmus which can have up to 90 fin rays. Also compared to the related genera which may have three complete lateral lines, the species in Congrogadus have only have a single curtailed lateral line. In addition some species which are classified in the subgenus Congrogadoides have the gill membranes fused to the isthmus. The gill membranes of the subgenus Congrogadus are not fused while the species in that subgenus and in the third, Pilbaraichthys possess a posterior otic sensory canal pore, which is believed to assist the fish in detecting motion.

== Biology ==
Congrogadus are secretive fish which hide among rocks and coral rubble and they occur from the surface down to 70 metres (230 ft). They feed mainly on crustaceans but larger specimens will take fish, and their large mouth enable them to swallow quite large prey. Most species of the subfamily are protogynous hermaphrodites but Congrogadus subducens appears to be different because the females greater than 300 millimetres (12 in) long have been observed to have small gonads, a feature which almost certainly means that they are not protogynous hermaphrodites. All of this subfamily lay eggs in a small clump. The eggs of species within Congragadus are a distinguishing feature of the genus as each egg is attached to a small hook which has a thin thread. When the egg mass begins to disintegrate the hook falls from the egg to be suspended underneath it by the thread. It is thought this allows the egg to attach itself to the substrate.

== Distribution ==
The genus is found in the Indian Ocean and the western Pacific Ocean and some species have rather restricted distributions while c. subducens has been claimed over a wide distribution from northern Australia through the Malay Archipelago to Japan, although other sources state that it is endemic to Australia.

== Species ==
The following species are classified as members of the genus Congrogadus:

- Subgenus Congrogadoides
  - Congrogadus amplimaculatus (Winterbottom, 1980) (Largespot eel blenny)
  - Congrogadus malayanus (Weber, 1909) (Malayan eel blenny)
  - Congrogadus spinifer (Borodin, 1933) (Spiny eel blenny)
- Subgenus Congradadus
  - Congrogadus hierichthys D.S. Jordan & R.E. Richardson, 1908 (Sulu eel blenny)
  - Congrogadus subducens (Richardson, 1843) (Carpet eel-blenny)
- Subgenus Pilbaraichthys
  - Congrogadus winterbottomi A.C. Gill, Mooi & Hutchins, 2000 (Pilbara eelblenny)
