= Anarchias cantonensis =

Conservation status
- Least Concern (IUCN 3.1)

Scientific classification
- Kingdom: Animalia
- Phylum: Chordata
- Class: Actinopterygii
- Order: Anguilliformes
- Family: Muraenidae
- Genus: Anarchias
- Species: A. cantonensis

Binomial name
- Anarchias cantonensis (L. P. Schultz 1943)

Synonyms
- Uropterygius cantonensis L. P. Schultz 1943

Species of fish

Anarchias cantonensis is a moray eel commonly known as the Canton Island moray or the Canton moray. It was first named by Schultz in 1943 and is found in coral reefs in the Pacific and Indian Oceans.
