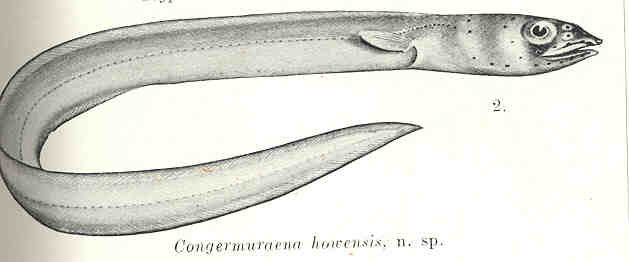

Conservation status
- Least Concern (IUCN 3.1)

Scientific classification
- Kingdom: Animalia
- Phylum: Chordata
- Class: Actinopterygii
- Order: Anguilliformes
- Family: Congridae
- Genus: Ariosoma
- Species: A. howensis

Binomial name
- Ariosoma howensis (McCulloch & Waite, 1916)

Synonyms
- Congermuraena howensis McCulloch & Waite, 1916

= Lord Howe conger =

Species of fish

The Lord Howe conger (Ariosoma howensis) is an eel in the family Congridae (conger/garden eels). It was described by Allan Riverstone McCulloch and Edgar Ravenswood Waite in 1916, originally under the genus Congermuraena. It is a marine, deep water-dwelling eel which is known from the western Pacific Ocean, including northeastern Australia, New Caledonia, and the South Fiji Basin. It is known to dwell at a depth range of 60–600 metres. Females can reach a maximum total length of 42.2 centimetres.

The species epithet and common name are derived from the Lord Howe Rise, near New Caledonia.
