= Ariosoma megalops =

Conservation status
- Data Deficient (IUCN 3.1)

Scientific classification
- Kingdom: Animalia
- Phylum: Chordata
- Class: Actinopterygii
- Order: Anguilliformes
- Family: Congridae
- Genus: Ariosoma
- Species: A. megalops

Binomial name
- Ariosoma megalops Fowler, 1938

Species of fish

Ariosoma megalops is an eel in the family Congridae (conger/garden eels). It was described by Henry Weed Fowler in 1938. It is a tropical, marine eel which is known from the western central Pacific Ocean. It is known to dwell at a maximum depth of 717 metres. Males can reach a maximum standard length of 14.9 centimetres.
