= Facciola's sorcerer =

Scientific classification
- Kingdom: Animalia
- Phylum: Chordata
- Class: Actinopterygii
- Order: Anguilliformes
- Family: Nettastomatidae
- Genus: Facciolella
- Species: F. oxyrhyncha

Binomial name
- Facciolella oxyrhyncha (Bellotti, 1883)

Synonyms
- Leptocephalus oxyrhynchus Bellotti, 1883; Nettastomella physonima Facciolà, 1914; Facciolella physonima (Facciolà, 1914)

Species of fish

The Facciola's sorcerer (Facciolella oxyrhynchus), also known as the Facciola sorcerer in Uruguay, is an eel in the family Nettastomatidae (duckbill/witch eels). It was described by Cristoforo Bellotti in 1883. It is a marine, subtropical eel which is known from the eastern Atlantic Ocean, including southern Portugal, Angola, and the Ligurian and Tyrrhenian seas. It dwells at a depth range of 30–731 metres; the young are known to inhabit caves, in which the larger specimens are found deeper. Males can reach a maximum standard length of 64.9 centimetres.

The Facciola's sorcerer's diet consists of decapod crustaceans in the taxon Natantia.
