= Anarchias euryurus =

Scientific classification
- Domain: Eukaryota
- Kingdom: Animalia
- Phylum: Chordata
- Class: Actinopterygii
- Order: Anguilliformes
- Family: Muraenidae
- Genus: Anarchias
- Species: A. euryurus

Binomial name
- Anarchias euryurus E. H. M. Lea 1913

Synonyms
- Leptocephalus euryurus

Species of fish

Anarchias euryurus is a moray eel found in the eastern Atlantic Ocean. It was first named by Lea in 1913.
