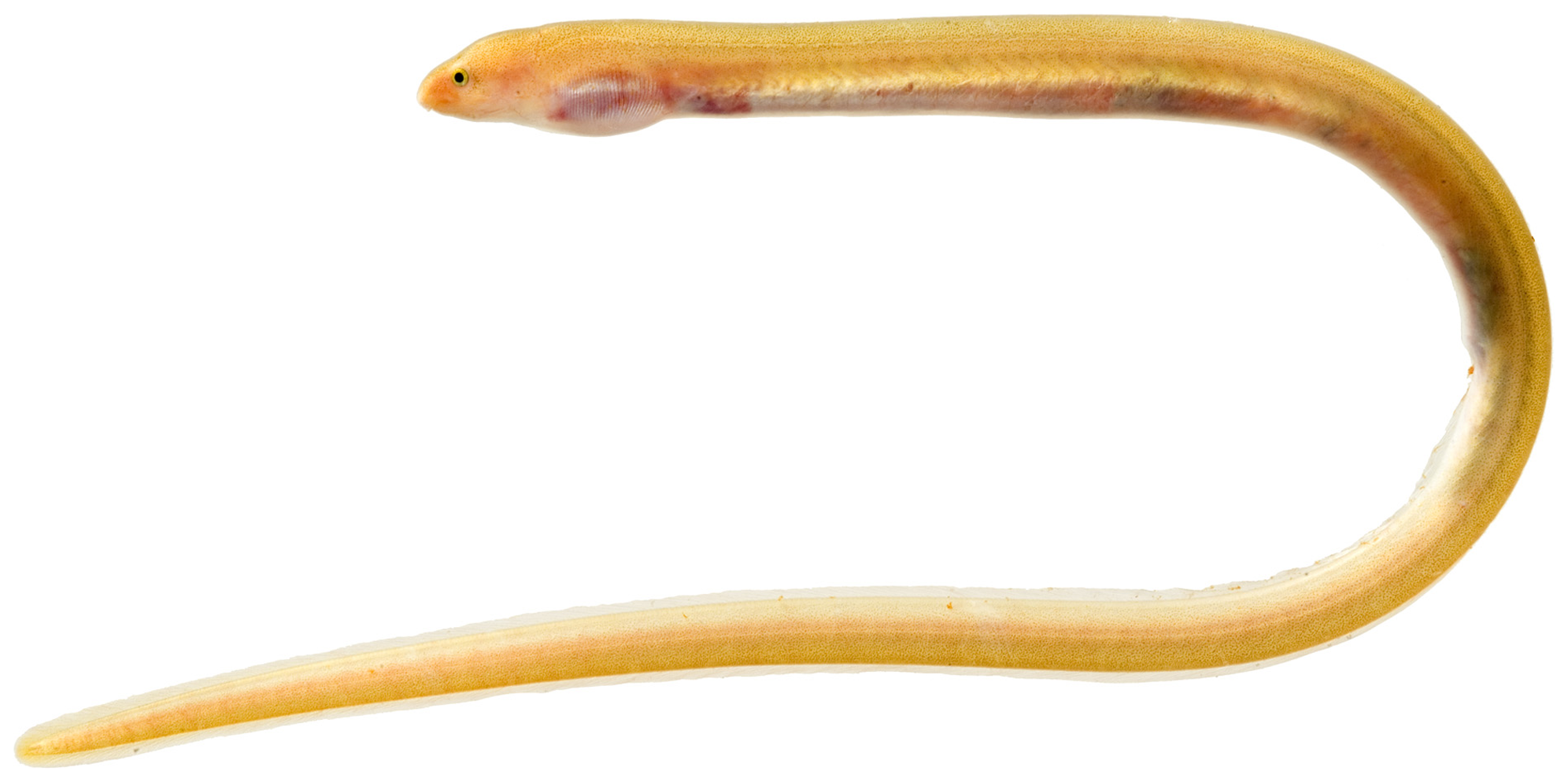

Conservation status
- Least Concern (IUCN 3.1)

Scientific classification
- Kingdom: Animalia
- Phylum: Chordata
- Class: Actinopterygii
- Order: Anguilliformes
- Family: Ophichthidae
- Subfamily: Myrophinae
- Genus: Ahlia; D. S. Jordan & B. M. Davis, 1892
- Species: A. egmontis

Binomial name
- Ahlia egmontis (D. S. Jordan, 1884)

Synonyms
- Myrophis egmontis Jordan, 1884; Leptocephalus crenatus Strömman, 1896; Leptocephalus humilis Strömman, 1896; Leptocephalus hexastigma Regan, 1916; Myrophis macrophthalmus Parr, 1930; Myrophis microps Parr, 1930

= Key worm eel =

Species of fish

The key worm eel (Ahlia egmontis) is a species of eel in the family Ophichthidae. It is the only member of its genus. It is found in the western Atlantic Ocean from Canada through the Gulf of Mexico and the Caribbean islands to Brazil in reef environments.
