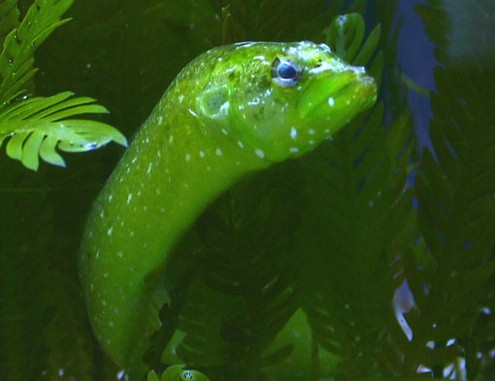

Conservation status
- Least Concern (IUCN 3.1)

Scientific classification
- Kingdom: Animalia
- Phylum: Chordata
- Class: Actinopterygii
- Order: Blenniiformes
- Family: Pseudochromidae
- Genus: Congrogadus
- Species: C. subducens

Binomial name
- Congrogadus subducens (Richardson, 1843)

Synonyms
- Machaerium subducens Richardson, 1843; Machaerium nebulatum Bleeker, 1852; Congrogadus nebulatus (Bleeker, 1852); Machaerium reticulatum Bleeker, 1853; Congrogadus reticulatus (Bleeker, 1853); Stenophus marmoratus Castelnau, 1875; Stenophus obscurus Castelnau, 1875; Hierichthys encryptes D.S. Jordan & Fowler, 1902; Congrogadus encryptes (D.S. Jordan & Fowler, 1902)

= Congrogadus subducens =

Species of fish

The carpet eel-blenny (Congrogadus subducens), also known as the green wolf eel or green wolf eel blenny, is a relatively large species of dottyback found in coastal parts of the Indo-West Pacific, including coral reefs, among rocks, seagrass beds, and tidal flats, and in brackish habitats. Despite the common names, it is unrelated to the true wolf eel of the North Pacific, the true eel of the order Anguilliformes, and the true blennies of the suborder Blennioidei.

It is the largest dottyback, reaching up to 45 cm (1 ft 6 in) in length. Its colour is very variable (green, brown, black, or bluish; often with spots or blotches) and the carpet eel-blenny can change it to match the surroundings.

The carpet eel-blenny occasionally makes its way into the marine aquarium trade, but it is predatory and eats crustaceans and smaller fish.
