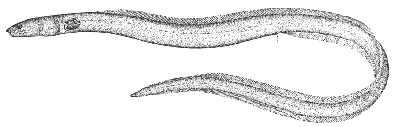

Scientific classification
- Kingdom: Animalia
- Phylum: Chordata
- Class: Actinopterygii
- Order: Anguilliformes
- Family: Ophichthidae
- Genus: Ophichthus
- Species: O. cruentifer

Binomial name
- Ophichthus cruentifer (Goode & T. H. Bean, 1896)

Synonyms
- Pisoodonophis cruentifer Goode and Bean, 1896; Leptocephalus mucronatus

= Margined snake eel =

Species of fish

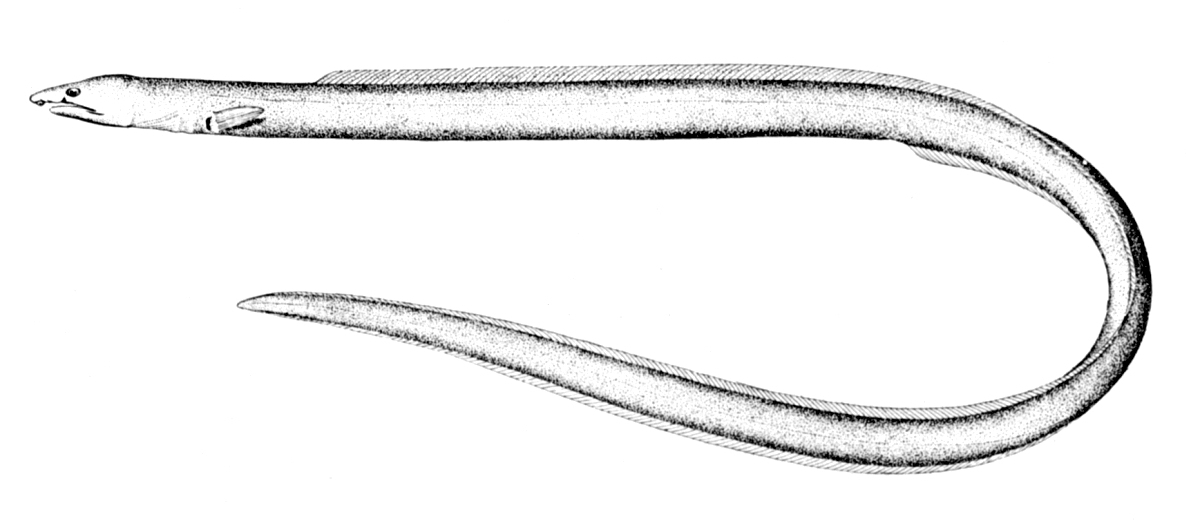
Ophichthus cruentifer

The margined snake eel (Ophichthus cruentifer) is a snake eel in the genus Ophichthus. It is found in the coastal waters of the western North Atlantic. It inhabits offshore waters at depths of about 106–154 m (348–505 ft).

== Description ==
Ophichthus cruentifer grows to 47 cm (1 ft 7 in) total length. Males mature at about 20 cm (7.9 in) and females at about 23 cm (9.1 in) TL.

The following description is from Bigelow and Schroeder's Fishes of the Gulf of Maine:

The most striking feature of this fish and one that distinguishes it from all other Gulf of Maine eels is that the tip of its tail is hard and pointed. Other distinctive features are that it is only about one thirty-seventh to one thirty-eighth as deep as it is long; that its dorsal fin originates only a short distance behind the tips of the pectoral fins when these are laid back; that its anal fin originates far behind its dorsal fin; that its snout is bluntly pointed; and that its mouth gapes rearward considerably beyond its eyes (but not so far back as in the long-nosed eel). The dorsal and anal fins end a little in front of the tip of the tail. The gill openings are short new-moon-shaped slits, close in front of the bases of the pectoral fins. Its "peculiar and savage physiognomy" was stressed by its describers.

It was originally described as brownish yellow uniformly. However, those that have been sighted have been light brown uniformly, with large snake eels being darker than small ones. A young specimen about 2½ inches (6½ cm) long was pale with dark speckles.
