= Tropical conger =

Conservation status
- Least Concern (IUCN 3.1)

Scientific classification
- Kingdom: Animalia
- Phylum: Chordata
- Class: Actinopterygii
- Order: Anguilliformes
- Family: Congridae
- Genus: Ariosoma
- Species: A. scheelei

Binomial name
- Ariosoma scheelei (Strömman, 1896)

Synonyms
- Leptocephalus scheelei Strömman, 1896

Species of fish

The tropical conger (Ariosoma scheelei), also known as the Scheele's conger, is an eel in the family Congridae (conger/garden eels). It was described by Pehr Hugo Strömman in 1896, originally under the genus Leptocephalus. It is a tropical, marine eel which is known from the Indo-Pacific, including Natal and Mozambique. It inhabits reefs in lagoons, and is known to dwell at a depth of 9 metres. Males can reach a maximum total length of 20 centimetres (7.9 in).

Named in honor of Capt. George von Schéele, seaman and amateur naturalist, who collected type specimen.
