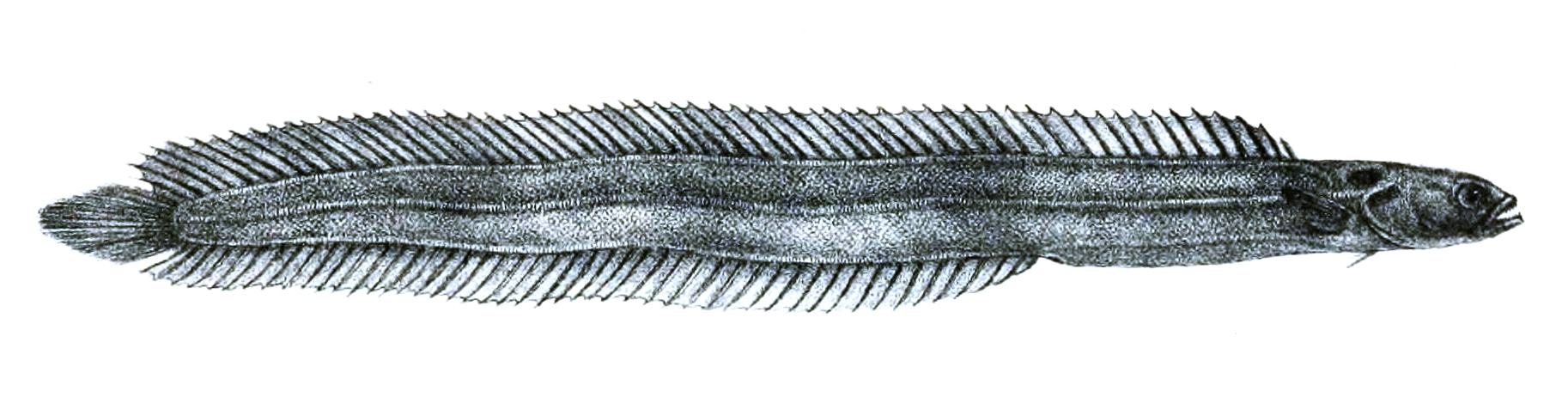
- Halidesmus scapularis

Scientific classification
- Kingdom: Animalia
- Phylum: Chordata
- Class: Actinopterygii
- Order: Blenniiformes
- Family: Pseudochromidae
- Subfamily: Congrogadinae
- Genus: Halidesmus; Günther, 1872

Type species
- Halidesmus scapularis Günther, 1872

Synonyms
- Pholioides Nielsen, 1961; Porogrammus Gilchrist & Thompson, 1916; Tentaculus Rao & Dutt, 1966

= Halidesmus =

Genus of fishes

Halidesmus is a genus of ray-finned fishes, the type genus of the subfamily Congrogadinae, the eel blennies, part of the dottyback family, Pseudochromidae. They are found in the western Indian Ocean as far east as India, with one species extending marginally into the south-east Atlantic Ocean.

== Species ==
The following species are classified in the genus Halidesmus:

- Halidesmus coccus Winterbottom & Randall, 1994 (Rooster snakelet)
- Halidesmus polytretus Winterbottom, 1982
- Halidesmus scapularis Günther, 1872 (Snakelet )
- Halidesmus socotraensis A. C. Gill & Zajonz, 2003 (Socotran snakelet)
- Halidesmus thomaseni (Nielsen, 1961) (Thomasen's snakelet)
