= Anarchias similis =

Conservation status
- Least Concern (IUCN 3.1)

Scientific classification
- Kingdom: Animalia
- Phylum: Chordata
- Class: Actinopterygii
- Order: Anguilliformes
- Family: Muraenidae
- Genus: Anarchias
- Species: A. similis

Binomial name
- Anarchias similis (E. H. M. Lea, 1913)

Synonyms
- Anarchias grassi (non Roule, 1916); Anarchias yoshiae Kanazawa, 1952; Leptocephalus similis Lea, 1913

Species of fish

Anarchias similis is a moray eel found in coral reefs in the Atlantic Ocean. It was first named by Lea in 1913, and is commonly known as the pygmy moray, but is not to be confused with the Pacific species of the same name, Gymnothorax robinsi. It ranges in color and patterning from dark brown all over to blotched.
