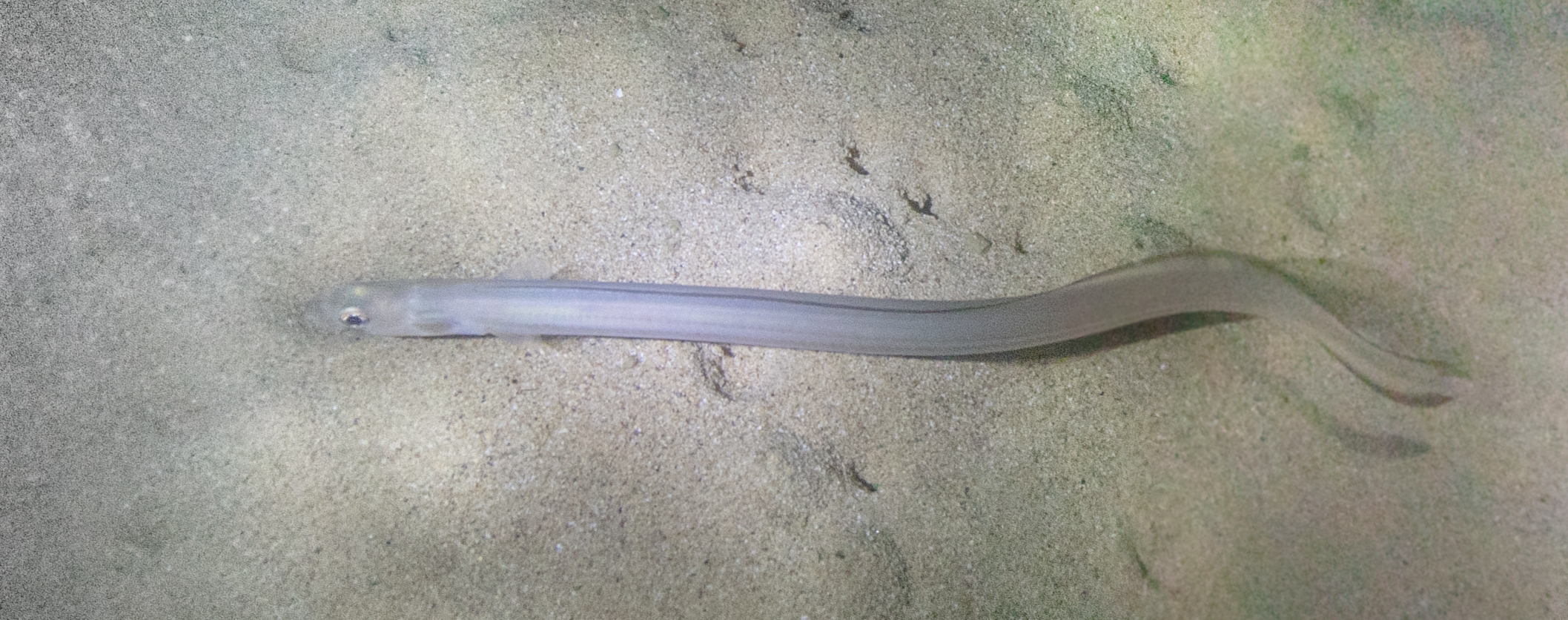

Conservation status
- Least Concern (IUCN 3.1)

Scientific classification
- Kingdom: Animalia
- Phylum: Chordata
- Class: Actinopterygii
- Order: Anguilliformes
- Family: Congridae
- Genus: Ariosoma
- Species: A. balearicum

Binomial name
- Ariosoma balearicum (Delaroche, 1809)

Synonyms
- Muraena balearica Delaroche, 1809; Conger balearicus (Delaroche, 1809); Congermuraena balearica (Delaroche, 1809); Congrellus balearicus (Delaroche, 1809); Ophisoma balearicum (Delaroche, 1809); Congromuraena balearica (Delaroche, 1809) (misspelling); Echelus ciuciara Rafinesque, 1810; Muraena cassini Risso, 1810; Conger cassini (Risso, 1810); Ophisoma acuta Swainson, 1839; Conger auratus Costa, 1844; Helmichthys diaphanus Costa, 1844; Leptocephalus marginatus Kaup, 1856; Leptocephalus taenia Kaup, 1856; Conger impressus Poey, 1860; Ariosoma impressa (Poey, 1860); Ophiosoma impressus (Poey, 1860); Ophisoma impressus (Poey, 1860); Congromuraena impressa (Poey, 1860) (misspelling); Leptocephalus inornatus Facciolà, 1883; Leptocephalus affinis Facciolà, 1883; Leptocephalus eckmani Strömman, 1896; Leptocephalus ekmani Strömman, 1896 (misspelling); Leptocephalus rex Eigenmann & Kennedy, 1902; Leptocephalus microphthalmus Beebe & Tee-Van, 1928; Ariosoma minor Howell Rivero, 1934; Ariosoma somaliense Kotthaus, 1968

= Bandtooth conger =

Species of fish

The bandtooth conger (Ariosoma balearicum), also known as the Baleares conger or the Balearic conger, is an eel in the family Congridae (conger/garden eels). It was described by François Étienne Delaroche in 1809, originally under the genus Muraena. It is a subtropical, marine eel which is known from the western and eastern Atlantic and the western Indian Ocean, including North Carolina, United States; the northern Gulf of Mexico, northern South America, Canada, Portugal, Angola, the Mediterranean, and the Red Sea. It inhabits reefs and littoral shelves, and burrows into sand and mud. It dwells at a depth range of 1–732 meters (3–2,402 ft), but most frequently between 20–100 m (66–328 ft). Males can reach a maximum total length (TL) of 35 centimetres (1 ft 2 in), but more commonly reach a TL of 25 centimetres (9.8 in)

The bandtooth conger is of minor interest to fisheries.
