= Umberto D'Ancona =

Italian biologist (1896–1964)

- Born: 9 May 1896; Fiume
- Died: 24 August 1964 (aged 68); Ravenna
- Education: University of Rome
- Known for: Description of eels, contribution to the development of The Lotka–Volterra equations
- Scientific career
- Fields: Biology
- Workplaces: University of Padua, University of Siena, University of Pisa
- Doctoral advisor: Giulio Cotronei

Umberto D’Ancona (9 May 1896 – 24 August 1964) was an Italian biologist. He attended secondary school in Fiume and later enrolled as a student in the Faculty of Natural Sciences at the University of Budapest. During World War I he interrupted his studies to fight as an artillery officer, and became wounded and was decorated for military valour. From 1916 to 1920 he studied at the University of Rome under the supervision of Giulio Cotronei. He graduated with a thesis on the effect of starvation on the digestive tract of the eel.

He was assistant to Giovanni Batista Grassi and later succeeded Grassi as director of the Comparative Anatomy Institute of the Sapienza University of Rome. He later moved to the University of Padua where he founded the hydrobiological station in Chioggia that now bears his name. He was a member of the Accademia dei Lincei and a corresponding member of the French Academy of Sciences. His work covered marine biology and his interests ranged from physiology to hydrobiology, oceanography and evolutionary theory. He described numerous species, published over 300 papers and authored several books, among them Trattato di Zoologia (1953) and Elementi di Biologia Generale (1945). He studied the effect of reduced fishing effort on the fish stocks in the Adriatic Sea during World War I when fisheries were much reduced.

In 1926 he married Luisa Volterra, daughter of the mathematician Vito Volterra. D'Ancona's work and discussions with Volterra on the effect of reduced fishing on fish stocks inspired Volterra's work on mathematical biology and led to the formulation of the Lotka-Volterra predator-prey model. After Volterra's death d'Ancona published his book La Lotta per l'Esistenza (1942) (translated into English as The Struggle for Existence (1954)), which was inspired and motivated by the work of his father-in-law. The publication of this book in homage to Volterra in 1942 in fascist-controlled Italy is noteworthy as Volterra had refused to sign the oath of allegiance to the fascist government, and had to resign his university post and his membership of scientific academies as a result.

== See also ==
- Category:Taxa named by Umberto D'Ancona
