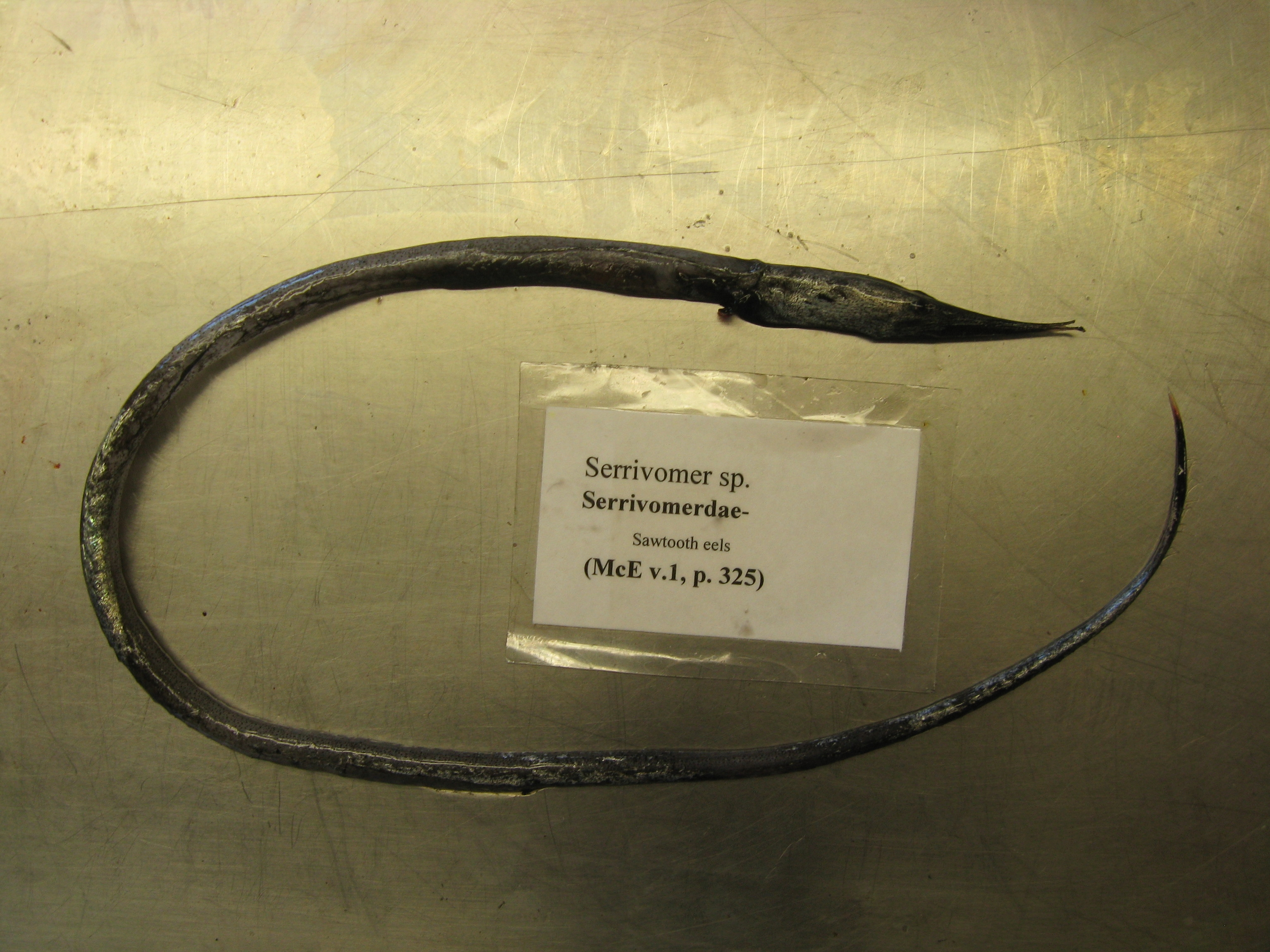
- Serrivomer

Scientific classification
- Kingdom: Animalia
- Phylum: Chordata
- Class: Actinopterygii
- Division: Teleostei
- Order: Anguilliformes
- Family: Serrivomeridae
- Genus: Serrivomer; T. N. Gill & Ryder, 1883

Type species
- Serrivomer beanii Gill & Ryder, 1883

Species
- 9 recognized species, see article.

= Serrivomer =

Genus of fishes

Serrivomer is a genus of deep-sea eel in the family Serrivomeridae. It contains nine described species. Member species are distributed widely, being found in the Atlantic, Pacific and Indian Oceans. The smallest species in this genus is Serrivomer jesperseni, which has a maximum length of 40.6 cm (16 in). The largest species in this genus is Serrivomer beanii with a maximum length of 78 cm (31 in). Most members reach a maximum length of 60–70 cm (24–28 in).

== Species ==
- Serrivomer beanii T. N. Gill & Ryder, 1883
- Serrivomer bertini Bauchot, 1959
- Serrivomer garmani Bertin, 1944
- Serrivomer glehni Nazarkin, 2023
- Serrivomer jesperseni Bauchot, 1953
- Serrivomer lanceolatoides (E. J. Schmidt, 1916)
- Serrivomer neocaledoniensis Bauchot, 1959
- Serrivomer samoensis Bauchot, 1959
- Serrivomer schmidti Bauchot, 1953
- Serrivomer sector Garman, 1899
