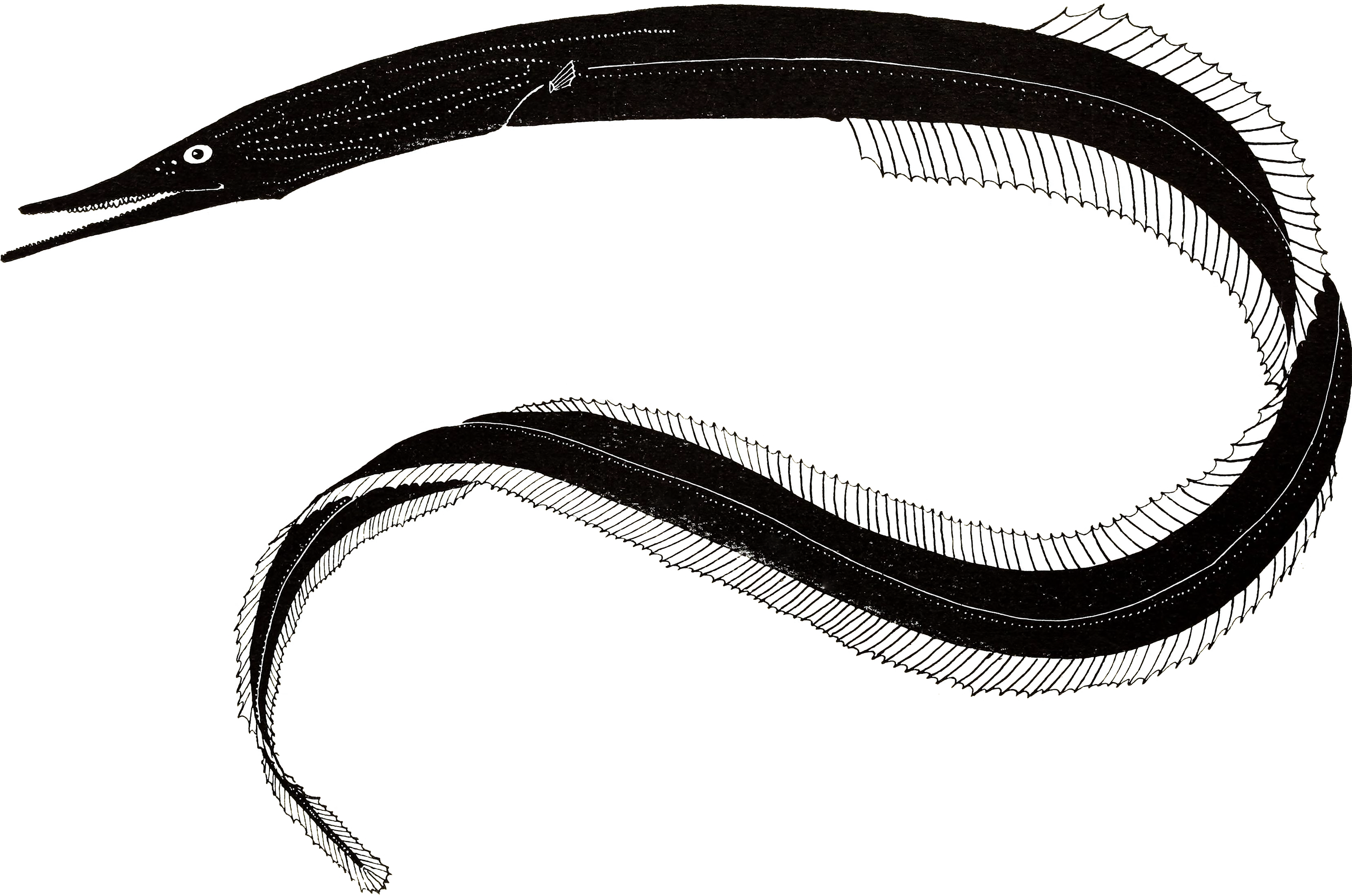

Conservation status
- Least Concern (IUCN 3.1)

Scientific classification
- Kingdom: Animalia
- Phylum: Chordata
- Class: Actinopterygii
- Order: Anguilliformes
- Family: Serrivomeridae
- Genus: Serrivomer
- Species: S. lanceolatoides

Binomial name
- Serrivomer lanceolatoides (E. J. Schmidt, 1916)

Synonyms
- Leptocephalus lanceolatoides Schmidt, 1916; Platuronides danae Roule & Bertin, 1924; Serrivomer danae (Roule & Bertin, 1924); Serrivomer sector brevidentatus Roule & Bertin, 1929; Serrivomer brevidentatus Roule & Bertin, 1929; Platuronides ophiocephalus Parr, 1932; Platuronides acutus Parr, 1932

= Short-tooth sawpalate =

Species of fish

The short-tooth sawpalate (Serrivomer lanceolatoides, also known commonly as the black sawtoothed eel) is an eel in the family Serrivomeridae (sawtooth eels). It was described by Johannes Schmidt in 1916 in its larval form, originally under the genus Leptocephalus, and later as a subspecies of Serrivomer sector by Roule & Bertin in 1929. It is a marine, deep water-dwelling eel which is known from the eastern central and western central Atlantic Ocean, including the Strait of Gibraltar, Cape Verde, the United States, the Bahamas and Bermuda, as well as the Strait of Gibraltar, Cape Verde, Canada and the United States. It dwells at a depth range of 150 to 6,000 metres (490 to 19,690 ft). Males can reach a maximum total length of 65 centimetres (26 in).

The species epithet "lanceolatoides" means "spear-like" in a combination of Latin and Greek, and refers to the eel's appearance. The short-tooth sawpalate's diet consists primarily of benthic crustaceans. It is reported to spawn between March and August in the Sargasso Sea.

The IUCN redlist currently lists the short-tooth sawpalate as Least Concern, due to the unlikelihood of it being endangered by any major threats as a result of its deep water habitat, and its lack of commercial interest to fisheries.
