= Thread eel =

Conservation status
- Least Concern (IUCN 3.1)

Scientific classification
- Kingdom: Animalia
- Phylum: Chordata
- Class: Actinopterygii
- Order: Anguilliformes
- Family: Serrivomeridae
- Genus: Serrivomer
- Species: S. bertini

Binomial name
- Serrivomer bertini Bauchot, 1959

Species of fish

The thread eel (Serrivomer bertini, also known as the thread sawtooth eel) is an eel in the family Nemichthyidae (snipe eels). It was described by Marie-Louise Bauchot in 1959. It is a marine, temperate water-dwelling eel which is known from the Indo-Pacific and Chile in the southwestern Pacific Ocean. It is known to dwell at a depth of 1,750 metres (5,740 ft).

== Etymology ==
The fish is named in honor of Léon Bertin (1896-1954), of the Muséum national d’histoire naturelle in Paris. Bauchot served as an assistant to him in 1952.
