= Rémy Perrier =

French zoologist (1861–1936)

- Born: 14 June 1861; Tulle, France
- Died: 27 June 1936 (aged 75); Chaunac, France
- Scientific career
- Fields: Malacology, Zoology
- Author abbrev. (zoology): Perrier R.

Rémy Perrier (14 June 1861, Tulle – 27 June 1936, Chaunac) was a French zoologist. He was the younger brother of zoologist Edmond Perrier (1844-1921) who directed the French National Museum of Natural History from 1900 to 1919 and founded the Friends of the Natural History Museum society in 1907.

Rémy Perrier studied natural sciences at the École normale supérieure, afterwards teaching classes in Poitiers. From 1926 to 1931 he was a professor of zoology at the faculty des sciences in Paris. He was a member of the Société des lettres, sciences et arts de la Corrèze.

Perrier specialized in research on the Prosobranchia (a subclass of snails). He is also remembered for his study of sea cucumbers, being credited with creation of the taxonomic genus Gastrothuria.

== Publications ==
Beginning in 1923, Perrier released "La Faune de la France en tableaux synoptiques illustrés", a work on zoology published in ten installments by Librairie Delagrave.

- 1A. Coelentérés, spongiaires, échinoderms. Sous-règne des protozoaires by Jean Delphy [1936].
- 1B. Vers et némathelminthes, by Jean Delphy [1935].
- 2. Arachnides et crustacés, with the collaboration of Lucien Berland and Léon Bertin [1929].
- 3. Myriapodes, insectes inférieurs [1923].
- 4. Hémiptères, anoploures, mallopages, lépidoptères ... [1926].
- 5. Coléoptères (part 1) [1927].
- 6. Coléoptères (part 2) in collaboration with Jean Delphy [1932].
- 7. Hyménoptères, by Lucien Berland, with the collaboration of Raymond Benoist, Francis Bernard, Henri Maneval [1940].
- 8. Diptères, by Eugène Séguy [1937].
- 9. Bryozaires, brachiopodes, mollusques, protocordés (amphioxus, tuniciers) with the collaboration of Paul Fischer, et al. [1930].
- 10. Vertébrés, poissons, batraciens, reptiles, oiseaux, mammifères [1924].
  - Other noted works by Perrier include:
- Recherches sur l'anatomie et l'histologie du rein des gastéropodes prosobranches, (1889) - Research on the anatomy and histology of the Prosobranchia
- Cours élémentaire de zoologie, (1899).
