= Crossthroat sawpalate =

Conservation status
- Least Concern (IUCN 3.1)

Scientific classification
- Kingdom: Animalia
- Phylum: Chordata
- Class: Actinopterygii
- Order: Anguilliformes
- Family: Serrivomeridae
- Genus: Serrivomer
- Species: S. jesperseni

Binomial name
- Serrivomer jesperseni Bauchot-Boutin, 1953

Species of fish

The crossthroat sawpalate (Serrivomer jesperseni) is an eel in the family Nemichthyidae (snipe eels). It was described by Marie-Louise Bauchot in 1953. It is a marine, deep water-dwelling eel which is known from the western and eastern Pacific Ocean, including Papua New Guinea, British Columbia, Canada; the Gulf of Panama and Chile. It dwells at a maximum depth of 825 metres (2,710 ft). Males can reach a maximum total length of 40.6 centimetres (16.0 in).

The species epithet "jesperseni" refers to P. Jespersen, a monographer of leptocephalids in the family Anguillidae.
