= Serrivomer garmani =

Conservation status
- Least Concern (IUCN 3.1)

Scientific classification
- Kingdom: Animalia
- Phylum: Chordata
- Class: Actinopterygii
- Order: Anguilliformes
- Family: Serrivomeridae
- Genus: Serrivomer
- Species: S. garmani

Binomial name
- Serrivomer garmani Bertin, 1944

Species of fish

Serrivomer garmani is an eel in the family Serrivomeridae (sawtooth eels). It was described by Léon Bertin in 1944. It is a marine, deep water-dwelling eel which is known from the Indian Ocean. It is known to dwell at a depth range of 30 to 2,250 metres (100 to 7,380 ft).
