= Samoa sawtooth eel =

- Drawing by Dr Tony Ayling

Conservation status
- Least Concern (IUCN 3.1)

Scientific classification
- Kingdom: Animalia
- Phylum: Chordata
- Class: Actinopterygii
- Order: Anguilliformes
- Family: Serrivomeridae
- Genus: Serrivomer
- Species: S. samoensis

Binomial name
- Serrivomer samoensis Bauchot, 1959

Species of fish

The Samoa sawtooth eel, Serrivomer samoensis, is a sawtooth eel of the genus Serrivomer, found in the southwest Pacific at depths between 500 and 2,000 m (1,640 and 6,560 ft). Their length is up to 75 cm (30 in).
