= Serrivomer schmidti =

Conservation status
- Least Concern (IUCN 3.1)

Scientific classification
- Kingdom: Animalia
- Phylum: Chordata
- Class: Actinopterygii
- Order: Anguilliformes
- Family: Serrivomeridae
- Genus: Serrivomer
- Species: S. schmidti

Binomial name
- Serrivomer schmidti Bauchot-Boutin, 1953

Species of fish

Serrivomer schmidti is an eel in the family Serrivomeridae (sawtooth eels). It was described by Marie-Louise Bauchot in 1953. It is a marine, deep water-dwelling eel which is known from the eastern and western Atlantic Ocean, including Cape Verde, Senegal, the Gulf of Guinea, and Brazil. It is known to dwell at a depth range of 0 to 2,000 metres (0 to 6,560 ft). Males can reach a maximum total length of 65.7 centimetres (25.9 in), but more commonly reach a TL of 34 centimetres (13 in).

The diet of S. schmidti consists of small bony fish and crustaceans. It is not of commercial interest to fisheries.

== Etymology ==
Although not identified by name, it was probably named in honor of biologist Johannes Schmidt (1877-1933), who led the Dana fishery research cruises of which during the type specimen was collected. He is also director of the Carlsberg Laboratory.
