= Dalophis multidentatus =

Conservation status
- Data Deficient (IUCN 3.1)

Scientific classification
- Kingdom: Animalia
- Phylum: Chordata
- Class: Actinopterygii
- Order: Anguilliformes
- Family: Ophichthidae
- Genus: Dalophis
- Species: D. multidentatus

Binomial name
- Dalophis multidentatus Blache & Bauchot, 1972

Species of fish

Dalophis multidentatus is an eel in the family Ophichthidae (worm/snake eels). It was described by Jacques Blache and Marie-Louise Bauchot in 1972. It is known from a single specimen collected from the Saloum River in Senegal, in the eastern Atlantic Ocean. It is known through this specimen to form burrows in sand or mud on the continental shelf, and to dwell at a depth of 50 m (160 ft). Males are able to reach a total length of 15.3 cm (6.0 in).
