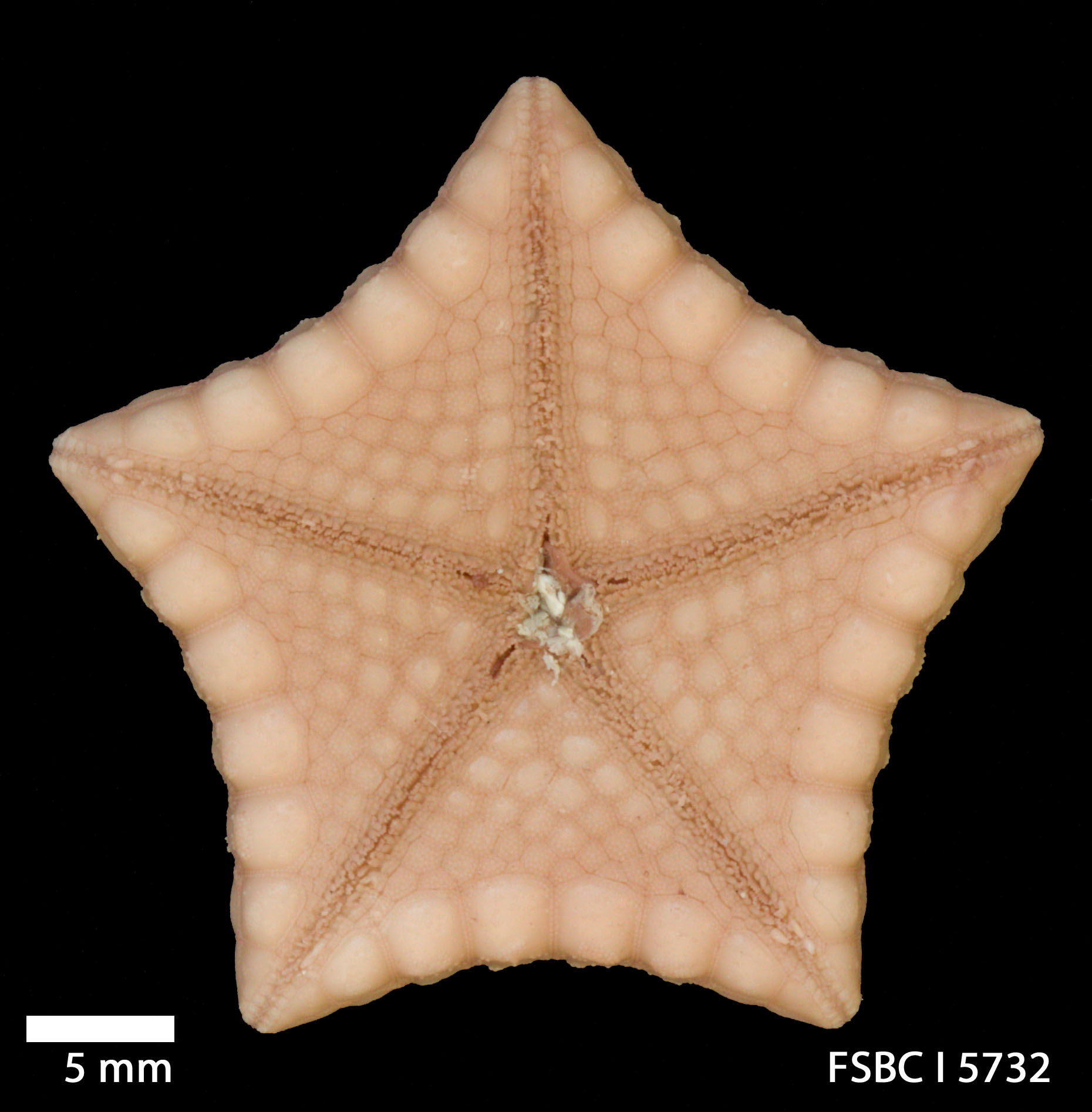

Scientific classification
- Kingdom: Animalia
- Phylum: Echinodermata
- Class: Asteroidea
- Order: Valvatida
- Family: Goniasteridae
- Subfamily: Pentagonasterinae
- Genus: Pawsonaster; Mah, 2007
- Species: P. parvus

Binomial name
- Pawsonaster parvus (Perrier, 1881)

= Pawsonaster =

Genus of echinoderms

Pawsonaster is a monotypic genus of echinoderms belonging to the family Goniasteridae. The only species is Pawsonaster parvus.

The species is found in America.
