= Nessorhamphus danae =

Conservation status
- Least Concern (IUCN 3.1)

Scientific classification
- Kingdom: Animalia
- Phylum: Chordata
- Class: Actinopterygii
- Order: Anguilliformes
- Family: Derichthyidae
- Genus: Nessorhamphus
- Species: N. danae

Binomial name
- Nessorhamphus danae E. J. Schmidt, 1931

Species of fish

Nessorhamphus danae, the blackbelly spoonbill eel or Dana duckbill eel, is an eel in the family Derichthyidae (longneck eels). It was described by Johannes Schmidt in 1931. It is a marine, deep water-dwelling eel which is known from throughout the Atlantic, Pacific, and Indian Oceans, including Australia, Brazil, Benin, Bangladesh, Cameroon, Cambodia, China, Ghana, Pakistan, Côte d'Ivoire, Guinea, India, Mozambique, Guinea-Bissau, Indonesia, Liberia, Malaysia, Kenya, Mauritania, Myanmar, Nigeria, Papua New Guinea, Senegal, Sierra Leone, the Philippines, Somalia, South Africa, Tanzania, Sri Lanka, Thailand, Togo, the Hawaiian Islands, USA; Yemen, and Vietnam. Males can reach a maximum total length of 30 centimetres (12 in).

Due to the widespread distribution of Nessorhamphus danae, as well as its deep-water nature and the subsequent perceived lack of threats, the IUCN redlist currently lists the species as Least Concern.
