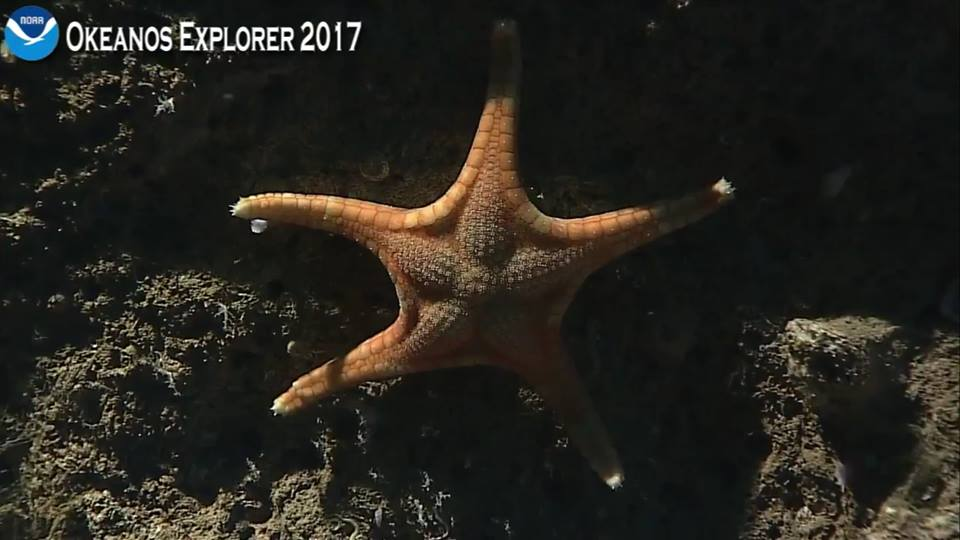
- Rosaster sp

Scientific classification
- Kingdom: Animalia
- Phylum: Echinodermata
- Class: Asteroidea
- Order: Valvatida
- Family: Goniasteridae
- Genus: Rosaster; Perrier, 1894

= Rosaster =

Genus of starfishes

Rosaster is a genus of starfish belonging to the family Goniasteridae.

The species of this genus are found in America, Indian Ocean, Malesia.

Species:

- Rosaster alexandri (Perrier, 1881)
- Rosaster attenuatus Liao, 1984
- Rosaster bipunctus (Sladen, 1889)
- Rosaster cassidatus Macan, 1938
- Rosaster confinis (Koehler, 1910)
- Rosaster endilius McKnight, 1975
- Rosaster florifer (Alcock, 1893)
- Rosaster mamillatus Fisher, 1913
- Rosaster mimicus Fisher, 1913
- Rosaster nannus Fisher, 1913
- Rosaster symbolicus (Sladen, 1889)
