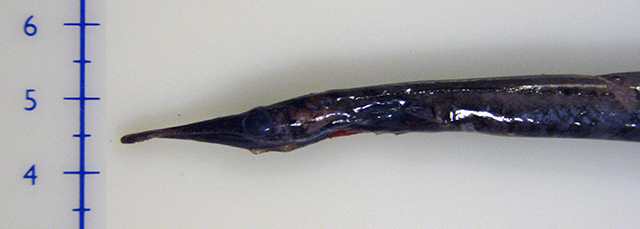
- Nessorhamphus ingolfianus

Scientific classification
- Kingdom: Animalia
- Phylum: Chordata
- Class: Actinopterygii
- Order: Anguilliformes
- Family: Derichthyidae
- Genus: Nessorhamphus; E. J. Schmidt, 1931

Species
- See text

= Nessorhamphus =

Genus of fishes

Nessorhamphus is a genus of eels in the family Derichthyidae. It currently contains the following species:

- Nessorhamphus danae E. J. Schmidt, 1931 (Dana duckbill eel)
- Nessorhamphus ingolfianus (E. J. Schmidt, 1912) (Duckbill oceanic eel)
