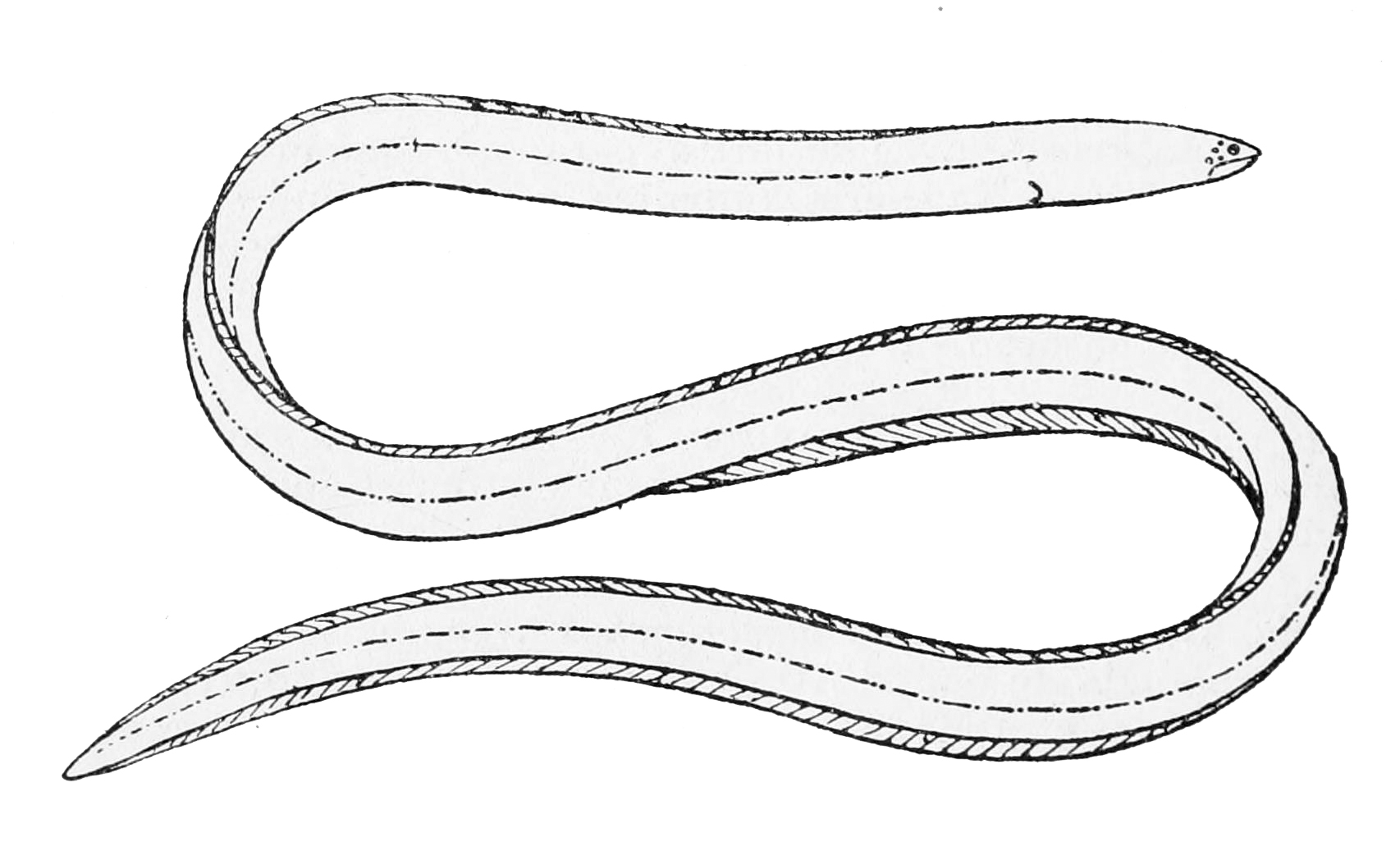
- Dalophis cephalopeltis

Scientific classification
- Domain: Eukaryota
- Kingdom: Animalia
- Phylum: Chordata
- Class: Actinopterygii
- Order: Anguilliformes
- Family: Ophichthidae
- Subfamily: Ophichthinae
- Genus: Dalophis; Rafinesque, 1810

Species
- See text.

= Dalophis =

Genus of fishes

Dalophis is a genus of eels in the snake eel family Ophichthidae. It currently contains the following species:

- Dalophis boulengeri (Blache, Cadenat & Stauch, 1970)
- Dalophis cephalopeltis (Bleeker, 1863)
- Dalophis imberbis (Delaroche, 1809) (Armless snake-eel)
- Dalophis multidentatus Blache & Bauchot, 1972
- Dalophis obtusirostris Blache & Bauchot, 1972
