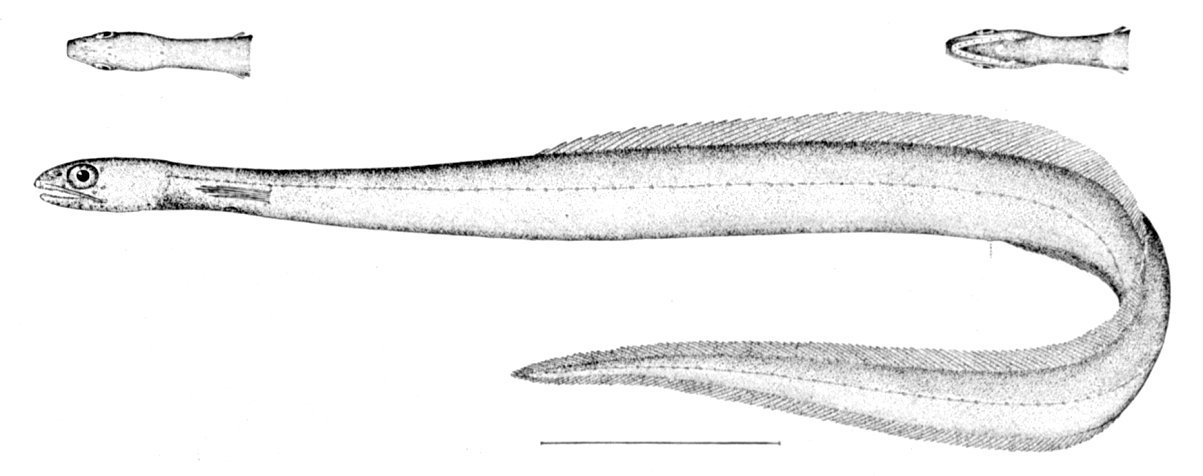
- Narrownecked oceanic eel, Derichthys serpentinus, from plate 49 of Oceanic Ichthyology by G. Brown Goode and Tarleton H. Bean, published 1896

Scientific classification
- Domain: Eukaryota
- Kingdom: Animalia
- Phylum: Chordata
- Class: Actinopterygii
- Order: Anguilliformes
- Suborder: Congroidei
- Family: Derichthyidae; Gill, 1884

Genera
- see text

= Longneck eel =

Longneck eels

Family of fishes

Longneck eels or neck eels are a family, Derichthyidae, of eels. They are pelagic fishes, found in the middle and depths of most oceans. The name comes from Greek deres meaning "neck" and ichthys meaning "fish".

They are distinguished by the presence of a series stripes on the head that form part of the sensory system, but otherwise the two genera of the family are quite different in appearance. Derichthys has a narrow neck and large eyes, while Nessorhamphus' has a long, flattened, snout. They grow to about 60 cm (24 in) in length.

== Genera and species ==
The three species in two genera are:

- Genus Derichthys Gill, 1884
  - Derichthys serpentinus Gill, 1884
- Genus Nessorhamphus E. J. Schmidt, 1931
  - Nessorhamphus danae E. J. Schmidt, 1931
  - Nessorhamphus ingolfianus (E. J. Schmidt, 1912)

In some classifications (for example, Systema Naturae 2000), this family is split in two, with Derichthyidae containing only the genus Derichthys, and Nessorhamphus being assigned its own family, Nessorhamphidae.
