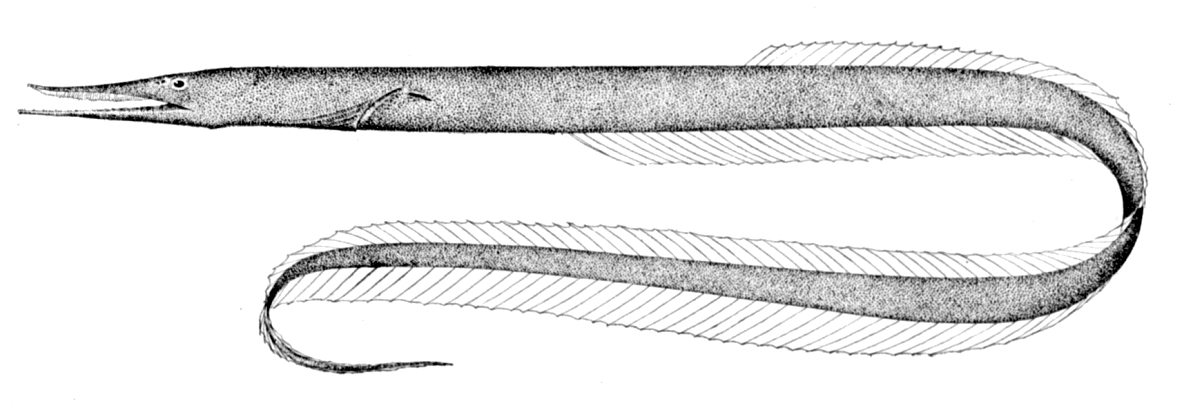

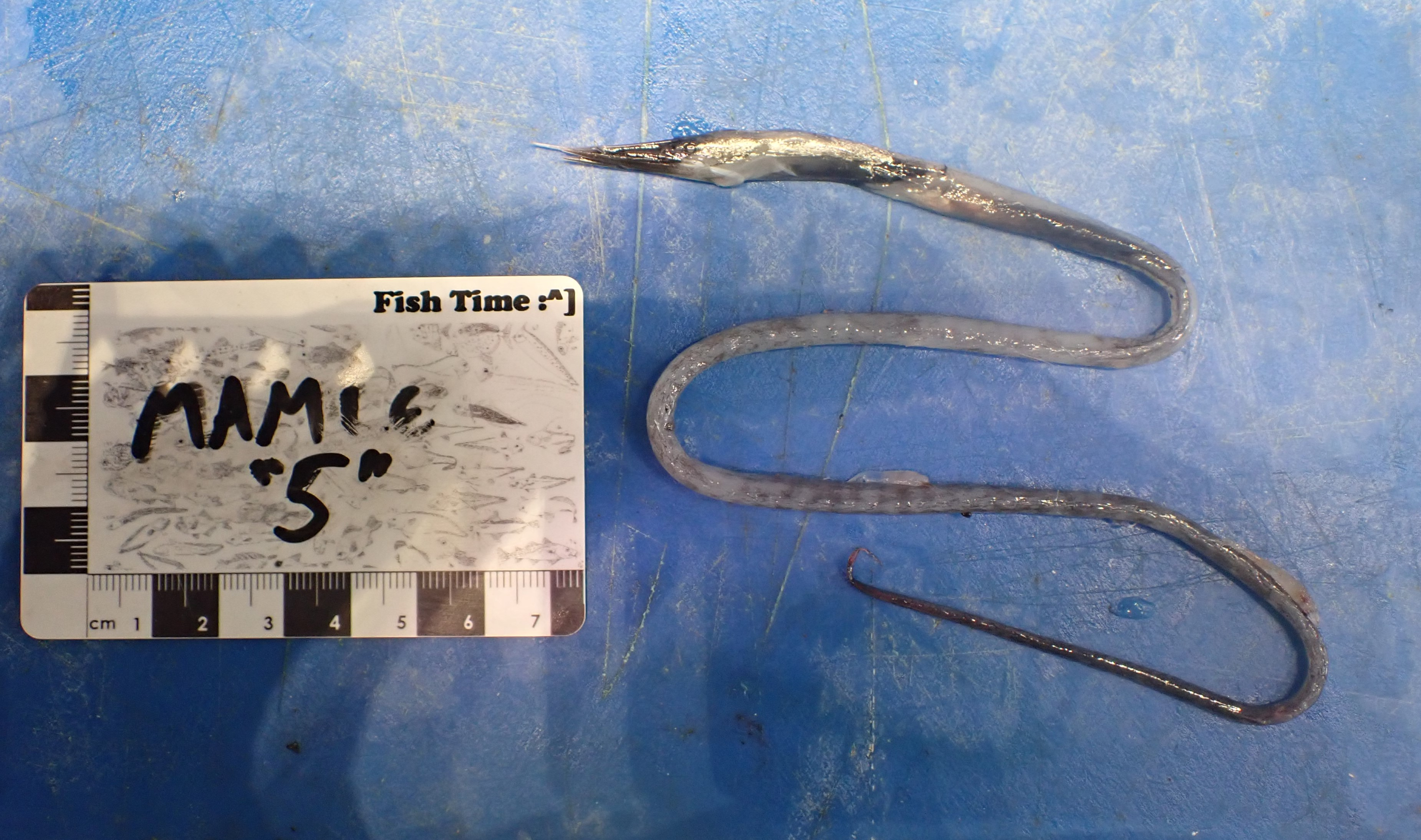

Conservation status
- Least Concern (IUCN 3.1)

Scientific classification
- Kingdom: Animalia
- Phylum: Chordata
- Class: Actinopterygii
- Order: Anguilliformes
- Family: Serrivomeridae
- Genus: Serrivomer
- Species: S. beanii

Binomial name
- Serrivomer beanii Gill & Ryder, 1883

Synonyms
- Leptocephalus lanceolatus Strömman, 1896; Serrivomer parabeani Bertin, 1940; Serrivomer beani Gill & Ryder, 1883 (misspelling)

= Bean's sawtooth eel =

Species of fish

The Bean's sawtooth eel (Serrivomer beanii, also known commonly as the longfin sawpalate, the saw-tooth snipe eel, the sawtooth eel, the shortnosed snipe eel, and the stout sawpalate) is an eel in the family Serrivomeridae (sawtooth eels). It was described by Theodore Gill and John Adam Ryder in 1883. It is a marine, deep water-dwelling eel which is known from throughout the Atlantic Ocean, the Indian Ocean, and the Western Pacific Ocean, including Iceland, South Africa (the Cape and Natal), Réunion, and Australia. It dwells at a depth range of 0–5,998 metres (0–19,680 ft), and leads a solitary lifestyle. It migrates vertically at night. Males can reach a maximum total length of 78–80 cm (30.7–31.5 in), making it the largest sawtooth eel.

The species epithet "beanii" was given in honour of American ichthyologist Tarleton Hoffman Bean. The Bean's sawtooth eel feeds primarily on benthic crustaceans including shrimps, and finfish, probably also small oreos and lanternfish. Young ones may be preyed upon by the Warty oreo (Allocyttus verrucosus). It is of no commercial interest to fisheries.

== Description ==
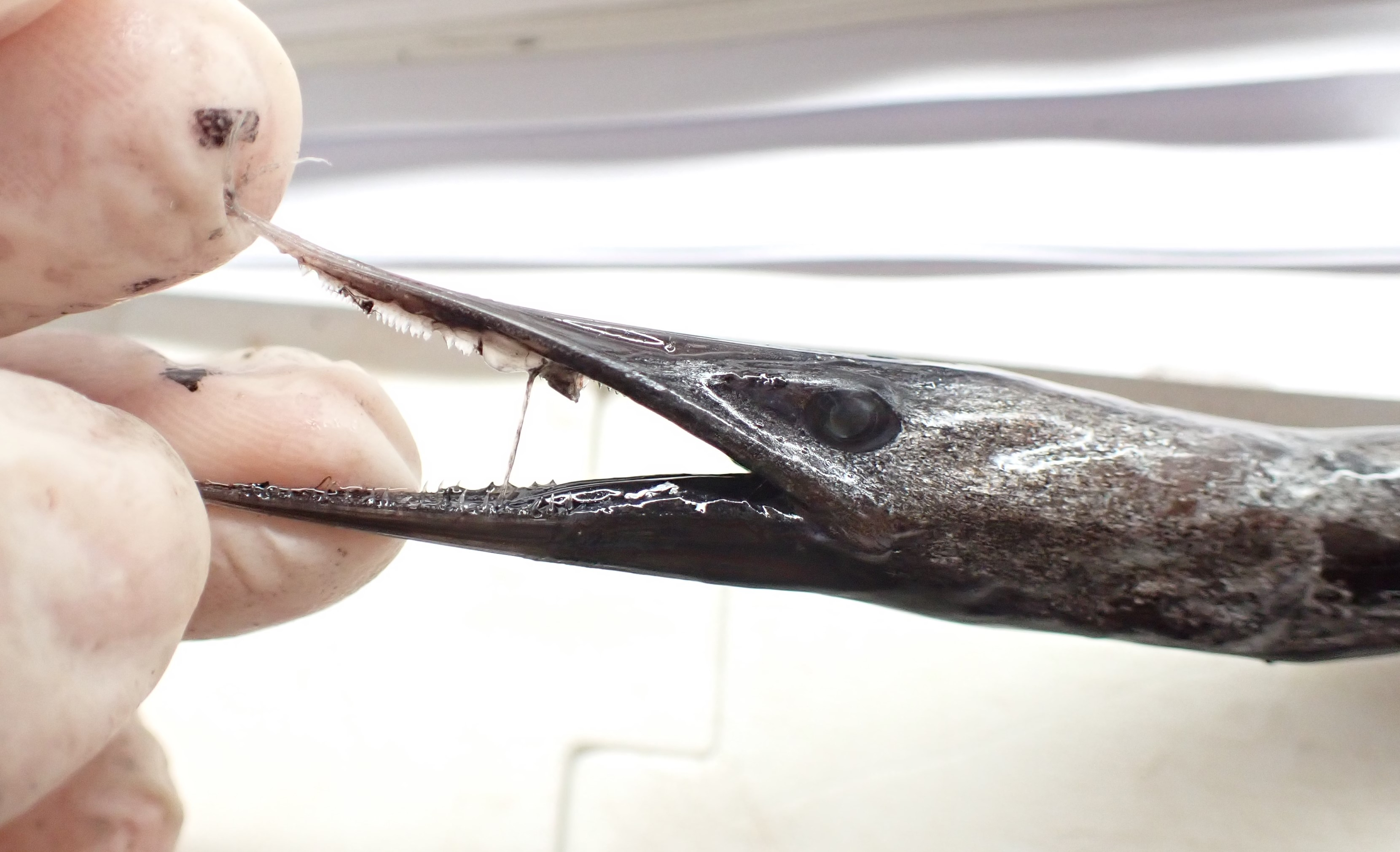
The mouth of S. beanii opened to expose the fused vomerine teeth, a feature that lends this genus its name.

The eel, like other sawtooth eels, has long, fine and narrow jaws with protruding teeth that are falciform and point backwards, to aid in the consumption of large prey. It has a pale, metallic blue-ish skin, delicate and without scales, which becomes translucid and gelatinous when the fish is brought to the surface. Caudal and pelvic fins are absent, the pectoral fins are falciform and small, and the dorsal and anal fins are merged in the end of the tail. The anal fin is longer than the dorsal fin. The fins are transparent, and have no true spines. During the night, it migrates vertically to feed on its prey, shrimp, lanternfishes, smaller eels, squid, and flashlight fishes.
