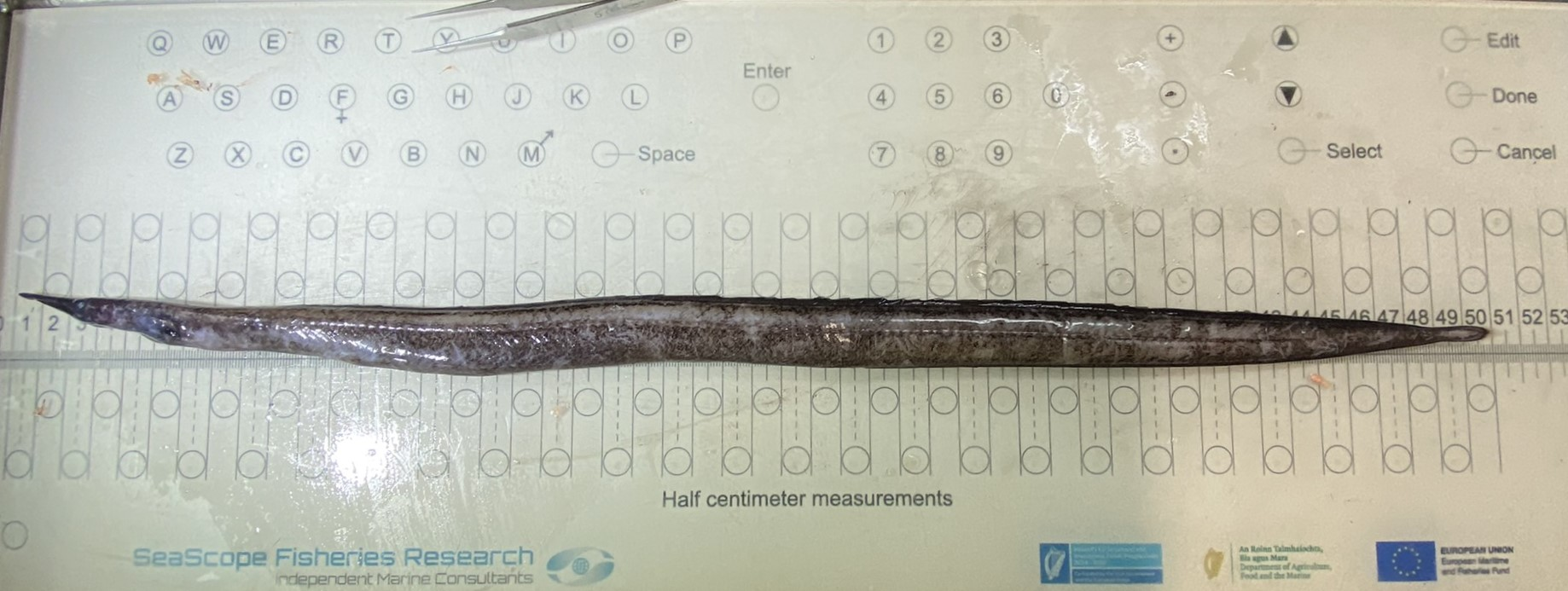

Conservation status
- Least Concern (IUCN 3.1)

Scientific classification
- Kingdom: Animalia
- Phylum: Chordata
- Class: Actinopterygii
- Order: Anguilliformes
- Family: Derichthyidae
- Genus: Nessorhamphus
- Species: N. ingolfianus

Binomial name
- Nessorhamphus ingolfianus (E. J. Schmidt, 1912)

Synonyms
- Leptocephalus ingolfianus Schmidt, 1912; Avocettina scapularostris Borodin, 1929

= Nessorhamphus ingolfianus =

Species of fish

Nessorhamphus ingolfianus, the duckbill oceanic eel, duckbilled eel or Ingolf duckbill eel,) is an eel in the family Derichthyidae (longneck eels). It was described by Johannes Schmidt in 1912. It is a marine, deep water-dwelling eel which is known from France, Morocco, the Cape of Good Hope, and South Africa in the eastern Atlantic Ocean, as well as from the western Atlantic, southwestern Indian, and southwestern Pacific. It dwells at a depth range of 0–1,800 metres (0–5,900 ft), inhabiting the mesopelagic zone. Males can reach a maximum total length of 58.9 centimetres (23 in; 2 ft).

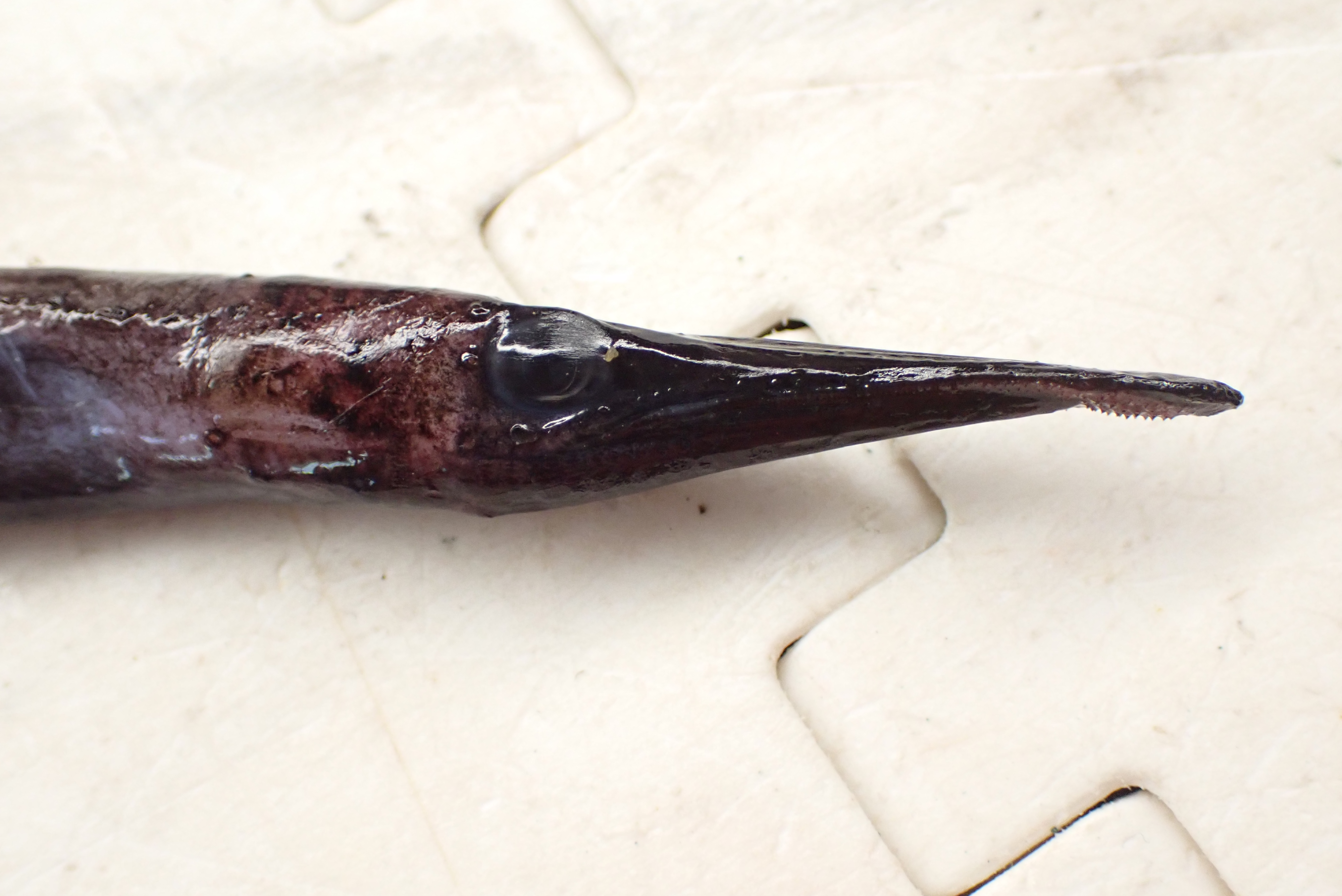
Head of N. ingolfianus.

Nessorhamphus ingolfianus feeds primarily on crustaceans.
