= Dalophis obtusirostris =

Conservation status
- Data Deficient (IUCN 3.1)

Scientific classification
- Kingdom: Animalia
- Phylum: Chordata
- Class: Actinopterygii
- Order: Anguilliformes
- Family: Ophichthidae
- Genus: Dalophis
- Species: D. obtusirostris

Binomial name
- Dalophis obtusirostris Blache & Bauchot, 1972

Species of fish

Dalophis obtusirostris is an eel in the family Ophichthidae (worm/snake eels). It was described by Jacques Blache and Marie-Louise Bauchot in 1972. It is a tropical, marine eel which is known from the eastern Atlantic Ocean, including Mauritania and Senegal. It inhabits estuaries and forms burrows in sand or mud. Males can reach a maximum total length of 38.8 centimetres.
