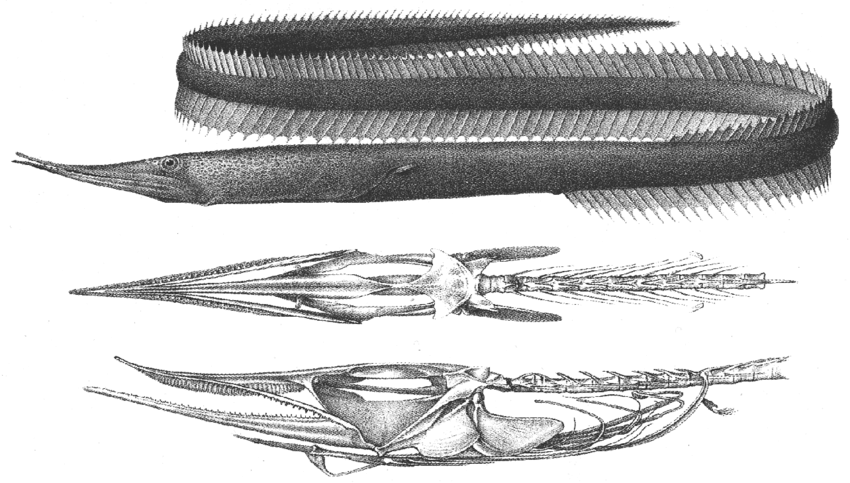

Conservation status
- Least Concern (IUCN 3.1)

Scientific classification
- Kingdom: Animalia
- Phylum: Chordata
- Class: Actinopterygii
- Order: Anguilliformes
- Family: Serrivomeridae
- Genus: Serrivomer
- Species: S. sector

Binomial name
- Serrivomer sector Garman, 1899

= Serrivomer sector =

Species of fish

Serrivomer sector, known commonly as the sawtooth eel, the saw-tooth snipe or the deep-sea eel, is an eel in the family Serrivomeridae (sawtooth eels). It was described by Samuel Garman in 1899. It is a marine, deep water-dwelling eel which is known from the eastern and western Pacific Ocean, including Japan, Chile, and California, USA. It dwells at a depth range of 0 to 3,243 metres (0 to 10,640 ft), most often around 305 metres (1,000 ft). Males can reach a maximum total length of 76 centimetres (30 in).

The species epithet "sector" refers to the manner in which the roof of the eel's mouth is divided into equal parts or "sectors" by the vomer. The diet of S. sector consists primarily of amphipods and zooplankton, as well as small bony fish and cephalopods.
