= Plectranthias bauchotae =

Conservation status
- Least Concern (IUCN 3.1)

Scientific classification
- Kingdom: Animalia
- Phylum: Chordata
- Class: Actinopterygii
- Order: Perciformes
- Family: Anthiadidae
- Genus: Plectranthias
- Species: P. bauchotae

Binomial name
- Plectranthias bauchotae J. E. Randall, 1980

Species of fish

Plectranthias bauchotae is a species of fish in the family Serranidae occurring in the western Indian Ocean.

== Size ==
This species reaches a length of 8.2 cm (3.2 in).

== Etymology ==
The fish is named in honor of Marie-Louise Bauchot (b. 1928), of the Muséum national d'Histoire naturelle in Paris, because of her contributions to ichthyology and especially for her kindness in supplying the author with answers to the stream of questions over the years about the specimens under her care.
