= Ariosoma bauchotae =

Conservation status
- Data Deficient (IUCN 3.1)

Scientific classification
- Kingdom: Animalia
- Phylum: Chordata
- Class: Actinopterygii
- Order: Anguilliformes
- Family: Congridae
- Genus: Ariosoma
- Species: A. bauchotae

Binomial name
- Ariosoma bauchotae Karrer, 1983

Species of fish

Ariosoma bauchotae is an eel in the family Congridae (conger/garden eels). It was described by Christine Karrer in 1983. It is a marine, deep water-dwelling eel which is known from waters northwest of Madagascar, in the western Indian Ocean. It is known to dwell at a depth range of 308–314 metres.

== Etymology ==
Named in honor of Marie-Louise Bauchot (b. 1928), ichthyologist and assistant manager, Muséum national d'Histoire naturelle (Paris).
