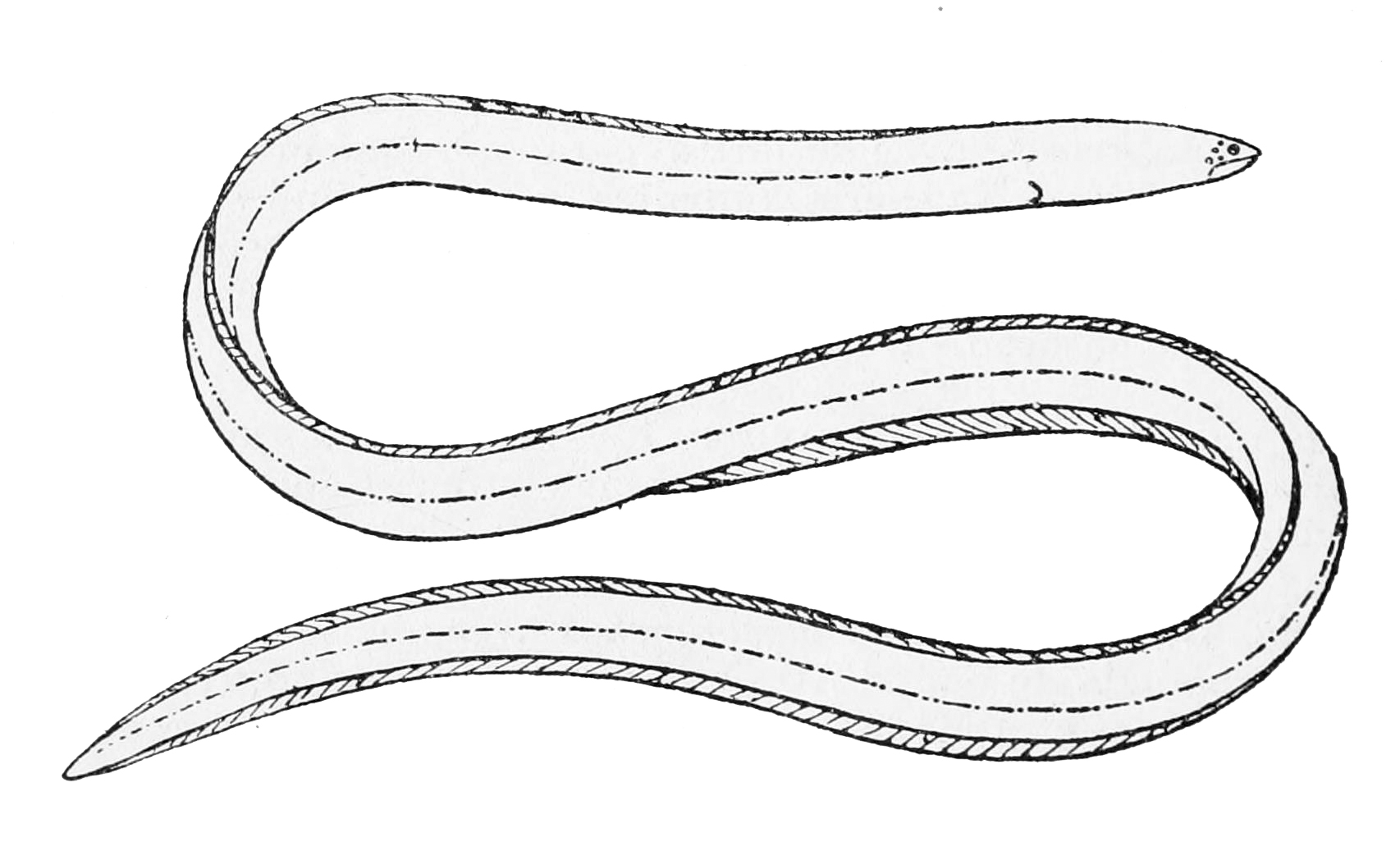

Conservation status
- Least Concern (IUCN 3.1)

Scientific classification
- Kingdom: Animalia
- Phylum: Chordata
- Class: Actinopterygii
- Order: Anguilliformes
- Family: Ophichthidae
- Genus: Dalophis
- Species: D. cephalopeltis

Binomial name
- Dalophis cephalopeltis (Bleeker, 1863)

Synonyms
- Sphagebranchus cephalopeltis Bleeker, 1863; Caecula cephalopeltis (Bleeker, 1863); Ophichthys buettikoferi Steindachner, 1894; Ophichthys buttikoferi Steindachner, 1894

= Dalophis cephalopeltis =

Species of fish

Dalophis cephalopeltis is an eel in the family Ophichthidae (worm/snake eels) first described by Peiter Bleeker in 1863. It is a tropical, marine eel which is known to inhabit the Eastern Atlantic near the coast of western Africa. It lives in estuaries and rivers, and forms burrows in sand or mud. Males have been recorded to reach a maximum total length of 53.5 centimetres.
