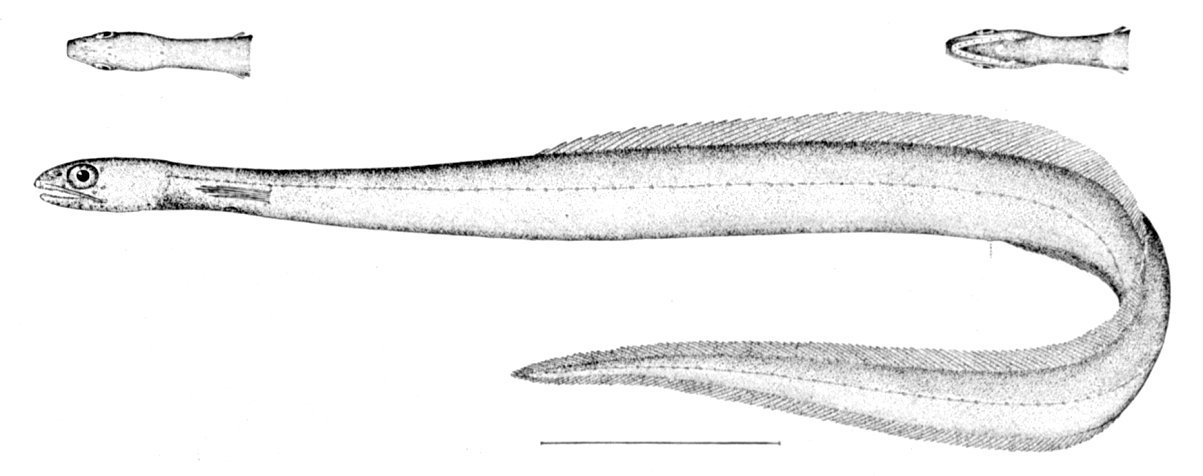
- From plate 49 of Oceanic Ichthyology by G. Brown Goode and Tarleton H. Bean, published 1896.

Scientific classification
- Kingdom: Animalia
- Phylum: Chordata
- Class: Actinopterygii
- Order: Anguilliformes
- Family: Derichthyidae
- Genus: Derichthys; T. N. Gill, 1884
- Species: D. serpentinus

Binomial name
- Derichthys serpentinus T. N. Gill, 1884

Synonyms
- Leptocephalus anguilloides

= Narrownecked oceanic eel =

Species of fish

The narrownecked oceanic eel, Derichthys serpentinus, is a longneck eel, the only species in the genus Derichthys, found in all oceans in depths between 500 and 2,000 m. Their length is up to 40 centimetres (1 ft 4 in).

The skin is scaleless and red-brown. It lives on the bottom at great depths.

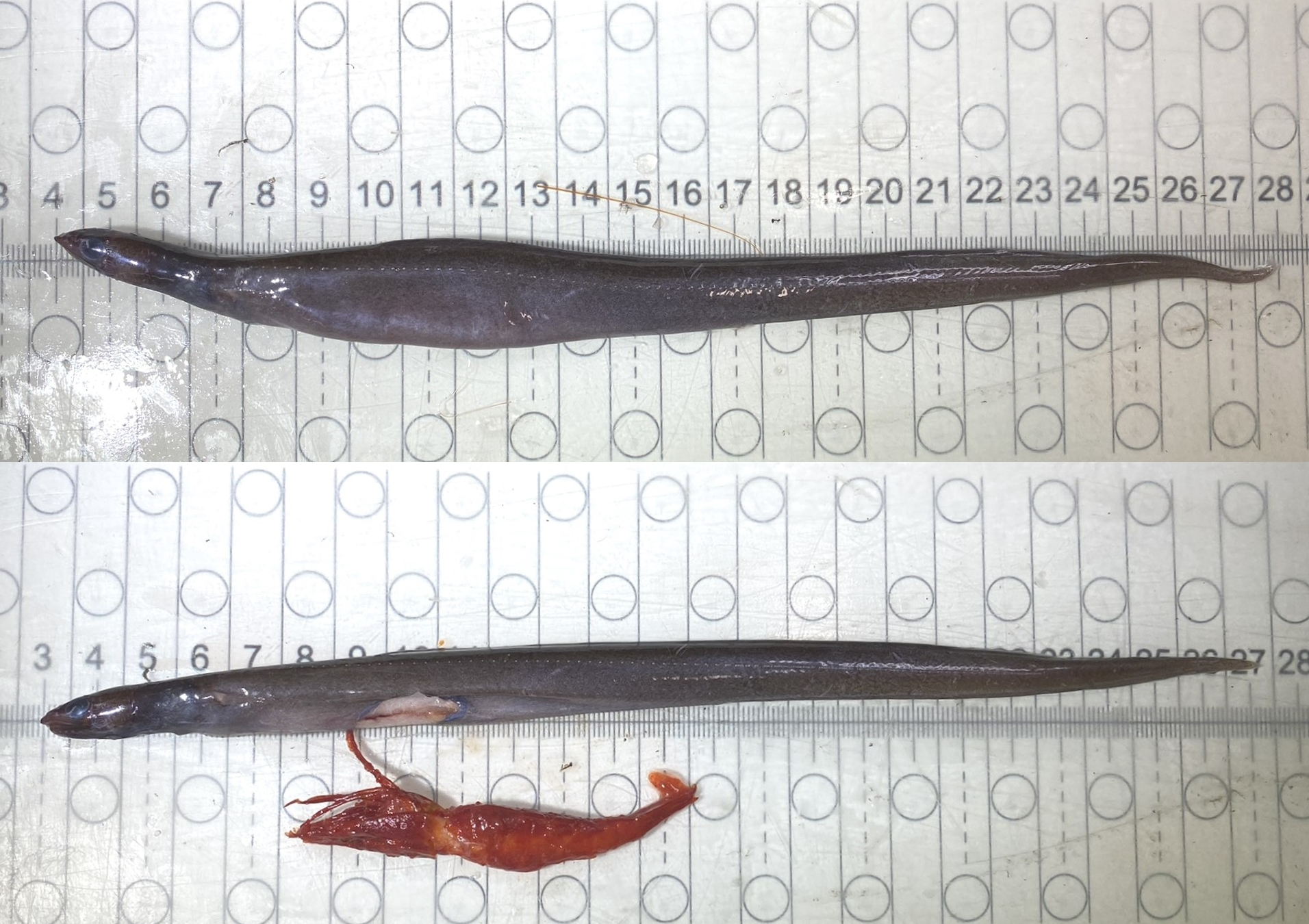
Freshly caught specimen of D. serpentinus before and after a large decapod prey item was removed from the stomach.
