= Dalophis boulengeri =

Conservation status
- Least Concern (IUCN 3.1)

Scientific classification
- Kingdom: Animalia
- Phylum: Chordata
- Class: Actinopterygii
- Order: Anguilliformes
- Family: Ophichthidae
- Genus: Dalophis
- Species: D. boulengeri

Binomial name
- Dalophis boulengeri (Blache, Cadenat & Stauch, 1970)

Synonyms
- Caecula boulengeri Blache, Cadenat & Stauch, 1970

Species of fish

Dalophis boulengeri is an eel in the family Ophichthidae (worm/snake eels). It was described by Jacques Blache, Jean Cadenat and Alfred Stauch in 1970. It is a tropical, marine eel which is known from the eastern central and southeastern Atlantic Ocean, including Angola, Benin, the Democratic Republic of the Congo, Cameroon, Côte d'Ivoire, Equatorial Guinea, Guinea, Guinea-Bissau, Ghana, Gabon, Gambia, Liberia, Mauritania, Nigeria, Sierra Leone, Senegal, and Togo. It is active at night, and inhabits burrows during the daytime, leaving its head exposed. Males can reach a maximum total length of 57.4 centimetres, but more commonly reach a TL of 47.5 cm.

Due to its wide distribution and lack of known threats, the IUCN redlist currently lists Dalophis boulengeri as Least Concern. Due to a lack of information on its distribution in Mauritania, it is listed as Data Deficient for Northern Africa.
