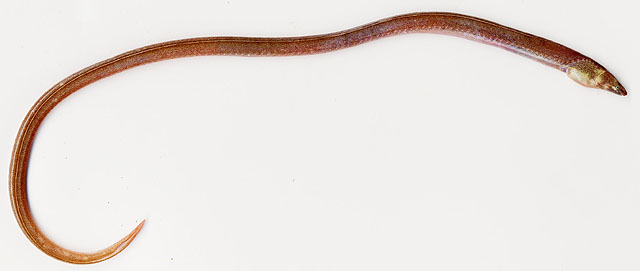

Conservation status
- Least Concern (IUCN 3.1)

Scientific classification
- Kingdom: Animalia
- Phylum: Chordata
- Class: Actinopterygii
- Order: Anguilliformes
- Family: Ophichthidae
- Genus: Dalophis
- Species: D. imberbis

Binomial name
- Dalophis imberbis (Delaroche, 1809)

Synonyms
- Sphagebranchus imberbis Delaroche, 1809; Caecula imberbis (Delaroche, 1809); Ophichthys imberbis (Delaroche, 1809); Dalophis serpa Rafinesque, 1810; Dalophis bimaculata Rafinesque, 1810; Pterurus flexuosus Rafinesque, 1810; Sphagebranchus oculatus Risso, 1827

= Armless snake eel =

Species of fish

The armless snake eel (Dalophis imberbis) is an eel in the family Ophichthidae (worm/snake eels). It was described by François Étienne Delaroche in 1809. It is a subtropical, marine eel which is known from the eastern Atlantic Ocean, including Spain, Mauritania, and the Mediterranean. It dwells at a depth range of 20–80 metres, and forms burrows in mud or sand. Males can reach a maximum total length of 150 centimetres.

The Armless snake eel's diet consists primarily of finfish and benthic invertebrates.
