= Paranebris =

Conservation status
- Data Deficient (IUCN 3.1).

Scientific classification
- Kingdom: Animalia
- Phylum: Chordata
- Class: Actinopterygii
- Order: Acanthuriformes
- Family: Sciaenidae
- Genus: Paranebris; Chao, Béarez & Robertson, 2001
- Species: P. bauchotae

Binomial name
- Paranebris bauchotae Chao, Béarez & Robertson, 2001

Genus of ray-finned fishes

Paranebris is a monospecific genus belonging to the family Sciaenidae, the drums and croakers. Its only species is Paranebris bauchotae which was first formally described in 2001 by Ning Labbish Chao, Philippe Béarez and D. Ross Robertson from the Golfo de Miguel in Panama. It is known from only three specimens which were found in depths of 5 to 10 m (16 to 33 ft) estuarine environments in the Golfo de Miguel. The genus name Paranebris means close to Nebris and the specific name bauchotae honours Marie-Louise Bauchot, an ichthyologist and assistant manager at the Muséum national d'Histoire naturelle (Paris), recognising her work at the museum.
