= Chaunac =

- Commune
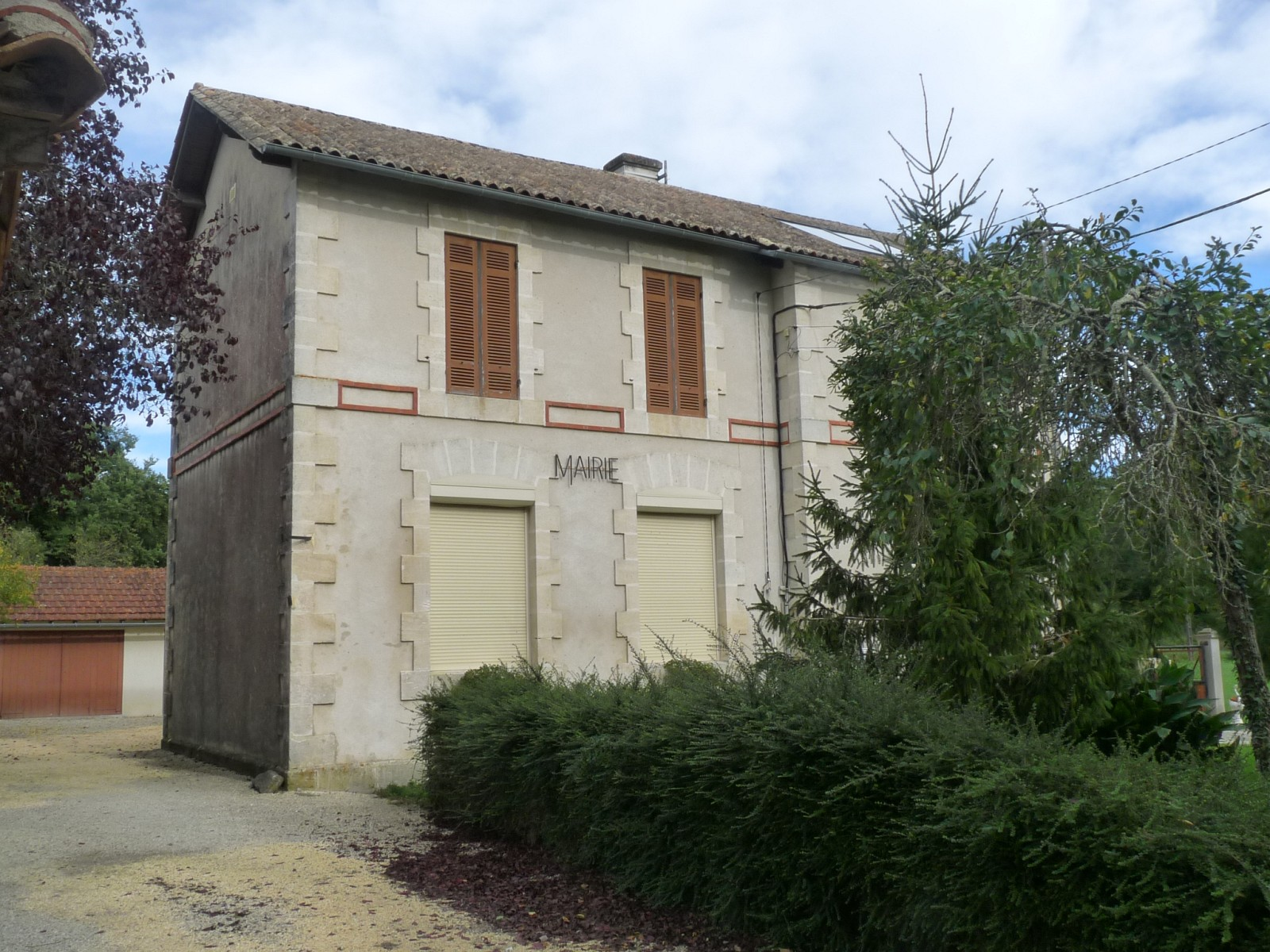
- Chaunac
- Location of Chaunac
- Location within France Location within Nouvelle-Aquitaine
- Coordinates: 45°21′40″N 0°21′32″W
- Country: France
- Region: Nouvelle-Aquitaine
- Department: Charente-Maritime
- Arrondissement: Jonzac
- Canton: Jonzac

Government
  - Mayor (2020–2026): Patrick Picq
- Area^{1}: 2.26 km^{2} (0.87 sq mi)
- Highest elevation: 56 m (184 ft)
- Lowest elevation: 42 m (138 ft)
- Population (2023): 67
  - Density: 30/km^{2} (77/sq mi)
- Time zone: UTC+01:00 (CET)
  - Summer (DST): UTC+02:00 (CEST)
- INSEE/Postal code: 17096 /17130
- ^{1} French Land Register data, which excludes lakes, ponds, glaciers > 1 km^{2} (0.386 sq mi or 247 acres) and river estuaries.

Chaunac (French pronunciation: [ʃonak]) is a commune in the Charente-Maritime department in the Nouvelle-Aquitaine region in southwestern France.

== Geography ==
The Seugne forms all of the commune's eastern border.

== Population ==
Historical population
Year	Pop.	±% p.a.
1968	103	—
1975	78	−3.89%
1982	81	+0.54%
1990	81	+0.00%
1999	56	−4.02%
2007	78	+4.23%
2012	93	+3.58%
2017	78	−3.46%
2023	67	−2.50%
Source: INSEE

== See also ==
- Communes of the Charente-Maritime department
