= Friends of the Natural History Museum Paris =

French non-profit organisation

Société des Amis du Muséum national d'Histoire naturelle et du Jardin des Plantes
- Founded: April 1907
- Founder: Edmond Perrier
- Type: Society 1901 law
- Services: Financial and moral aide to the French National Museum of Natural History
- Members: 4,047
- Key people: Edmond Perrier, Bernard Bodo, Raymond Pujol, Yves Cauzinille, Ghalia Nabi, Christine Sobesky, Paul Varotsis
- Website: amis-museum.fr

The Friends of the Natural History Museum (French: Société des Amis du Muséum national d’Histoire naturelle et du Jardin des Plantes or Les Amis du Muséum) is a French non-profit organisation (association loi 1901), created in 1907 and recognized as a charity (reconnue d'utilité publique) in 1926. Its purpose is to give practical and financial support to the Muséum national d’Histoire naturelle in Paris, France, enrich its collections, zoo, laboratories, greenhouses, gardens and libraries, and to promote scientific research and education related to it.

== History ==
Les Amis du Muséum was founded in 1907 by Edmond Perrier anatomist, zoologist and Director of the Muséum national d'Histoire naturelle. With the success of colonial exhibitions in the early 20th century, many people became interested in the new discoveries being made, but the Muséum could not afford new acquisitions. Perrier decided to create an organisation to support the actions of the Muséum, and assist in their funding. With President Léon Bourgeois, then president of the French Senate, Perrier created Les Amis du Muséum. There were many famous personalities among the first members: Raymond Poincaré, Emile Loubet, Paul Doumer and Prince Albert I of Monaco. Their political power was useful in helping to acquire new specimens as well as enhancing the flow of financial aid. In 1909, Les Amis du Muséum acquired its first specimen, an ichthyosaur currently on display in the Gallery of Palaeontology. From the beginning, Les Amis du Muséum organized various activities for its members.

1913 saw the first publication of Les Amis du Muséum, Nouvelles du Muséum, it served to inform members of the activities of the Muséum and is the ancestor of the current Bulletin. It already included at least one scientific paper per issue, such as the number 1933. Numerous issues have been published since despite shutdowns caused by war and lack of funds. The Bulletin continues to be published quarterly and is free for members of Les Amis du Muséum. Since 2012, the Bulletin includes a supplement aimed at younger members.

In 1926 under President Paul Doumer, then French Minister of Finance, Les Amis du Muséum is recognised as an official charity (reconnaissance d'utilité publique), which allows them to receive donations and legacies of the French government.

In 1935 a junior section is open for members under fifteen years old. Two branches are opened in Arcachon and Tananarive (today’s Antananarivo) with the aim of spreading the action of the Muséum in the French provinces and colonies. This is the year when the logo of Les Amis du Muséum was designed, it represents three fields present at the museum : Mineral, Plant and Animal.

From 1940 Les Amis du Muséum closed down and did not reopen until the end of the war. The Bulletin reappeared three years later as the Feuille d'information. In the 1950s Les Amis du Muséum membership was stagnating due to financial difficulties: the annual fee was deemed too expensive. In 1990, Mr Fontaine (in French), president of Les Amis du Muséum obtained the approval of the Muséum for free entrance to the whole site of the Jardin des Plantes in central Paris. This privilege had been abolished in 1923 and its renewal was appreciated by the public, and allowed the numbers of members to grow again.

== Functioning ==
Les Amis du Muséum is managed by a board composed of sixteen to twenty members elected by secret ballot for four years by the General Assembly, and selected categories of members that make up the assembly. The professors of the Museum that are part of the organisation are ex-officio members of the board (list of directors).
Board renewal takes place by quarter. The outgoing members are eligible for reappointment. The board elects from among its members by secret ballot, a bureau composed of a president, two vice-presidents, a secretary general, a treasurer and eventually an assistant treasurer. Former presidents may be appointed honorary presidents. Members of the bureau are elected for one year, except for the secretary general who is elected for four years. The Board meets at least once every six months and whenever convened by its president or at the request of a quarter of its members. The presence of one third of the Board is necessary for the validity of the proceedings.
The sessions of the Board are recorded in its Minutes that are signed by the president and the secretary general. They are transcribed without white spaces or erasures on a register, numbered and initialled by the prefect of Paris or his delegate.
The members of the Board receive no remuneration for their duties. Only expense reimbursements are permitted

== Additional informations ==
=== Acquisitions ===
1909 - Ichthyosaur Fossil
1910 - Drawings by H. Du Moustier de Marsilly
1913 - Insect Specimens for the Entomology laboratory
1933 - Collection of lepidopterist by Hans Fruhstorfer
1993 - Collection of vellums by C. Herpe-Graziani
1995
- 920 documents of mail sent to Gabriel Bertrand
- Letters from Buffon to Madame Necker
- Manuscripts by Marquis de Condorcet
1996
- Zoological collection from Africa
- Amphibian collection from Zaire
1997
- Book by C. Jaqueme "Poissons et animaux marins"
- Aquarelle paintings by M. Basseporte "Faune et flore d'Ile de France"
1998
- Ornithological Paintings by Wahast
- Baron Cuvier's briefcase
1999
- Manuscripts by Alcide d'Orbigny "Voyages dans l'Amérique méridionale"
2000
- manuscripts by Count Buffon "Les époques de la nature"
- 11 infographic paintings of insects by G. du Chatenet
2001 - Scientific books for the Zoological department of mammals and birds
2003
- Crystals of cinnabar on quartz from Kyrgyzstan and fluorite on quartz from Russia
- Documents relating to Pierre-Joseph Redouté
2004 - manuscripts by J. H. Fabre for the Harmas
2005 - Natural History manuscripts by Jean H. Fabre
2006 - book by Etienne de Laigue "Singulier traite sur des tortues, escargots et grenouilles et artichauts"
2007
- Renovation of the statue of Buffon by Carlus
- "Natural history of the squash" by Antoine-Nicolas Duchesne
2009 - Manuscripts by A.-L. de Jussieu, d’A. Thouin, de C. Darwin
2010 - "Flore" by Nicolas François Regnault (85 paintings from the mid-18th century) and photographs by the Duke of Orléans.
2012
- Financial supporter for a film on Théodore Monod
- Aid with the publication: "Animal certifié conforme", supervised by B.Lizet et J.Milliet (Ed. Dunod).
2013 - Purchase of the largest ever "Météorite de Draveil" (over 5 kg) for the Muséum.
2014 - Exhibition at CARAN in Paris: "Retour à l’Eden", an expedition of 18th-century Tasmania.

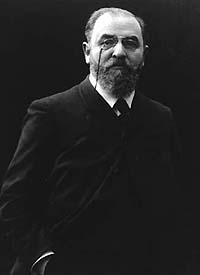
Léon Bourgeois 1st president of the Society

=== Presidents ===
1907 - 1922: Léon Bourgeois, French politician and sculptor
1922 - 1931: Paul Doumer, French president
1932 - 1945: Marcel Olivier (in French), author and governor of Madagascar
1945 - 1961: Jules Marcel de Coppet, governor of Madagascar
1961 - 1968: Julien Marnier-Lapostolle, botanist
1968 - 1969: Robert Genty (in French), colonel
1970 - 1980: Maurice Genevoix, French poet and author
1981 - 1991: Maurice Fontaine (in French), eminent French biologist
1991 - 2004: Yves Laissus, archivist palaeographer, former director of the Central Library of the Museum and General Inspector of the Libraries of France
2004 - 2016: Jean-Pierre Gasc, emeritus professor of the Museum (a specialist in the locomotion of vertebrates)
Since 2016: Bernard Bodo, emeritus professor of the Museum (a specialist in the "chemistry of natural substances" (Note: Chimie des substances naturelles (literally "chemistry of natural substances") is a commonly taught discipline in French universities and in the French academic milieu.))

=== Services ===
Les Amis du Muséum currently has more than 4,000 members and helps the Muséum in several ways:

- Financing of scientific projects and research of the Muséum, usually carried out by young doctoral students.
- Acquisition of specimens for the collections of the Muséum.
- Purchase of books for the library of the Muséum.
- Financing of projects and books.
- Weekly lectures during the school year, often presented by researchers that Les Amis du Muséum has previously funded.

Les Amis du Muséum offers many benefits to its members:

- Free entrance on the entire site of the Jardins des Plantes in central Paris: permanent galleries, temporary exhibitions, greenhouses, and the Jardin des Plantes zoo, the Ménagerie.
- Reduced entrance fees in the Muséum’s other sites: Arboretum de Chèvreloup, villa Harmas de Jean-Henri Fabre etc.
- Field trips and visits in France and abroad.
- Discounts on many natural history books (35% of the scientific publications of the Muséum as well as other discounts).
- Animal and botanical Drawing Lessons for young people.
- The Bulletin of Les Amis du Muséum, a quarterly magazine with a Youngsters supplement.
- Offering help and information, the Les Amis du Muséum secretariat opens Tuesday to Friday from 9.30 a. m. to 12.30 p. m. and from 2.00 p. m. to 5.30 p. m. On Saturdays it opens from 2.00 p. m. to 5.30 p. m. Closes doors to the public on Sundays and Mondays.
