= Edmond Perrier =

French zoologist (1844-1921)

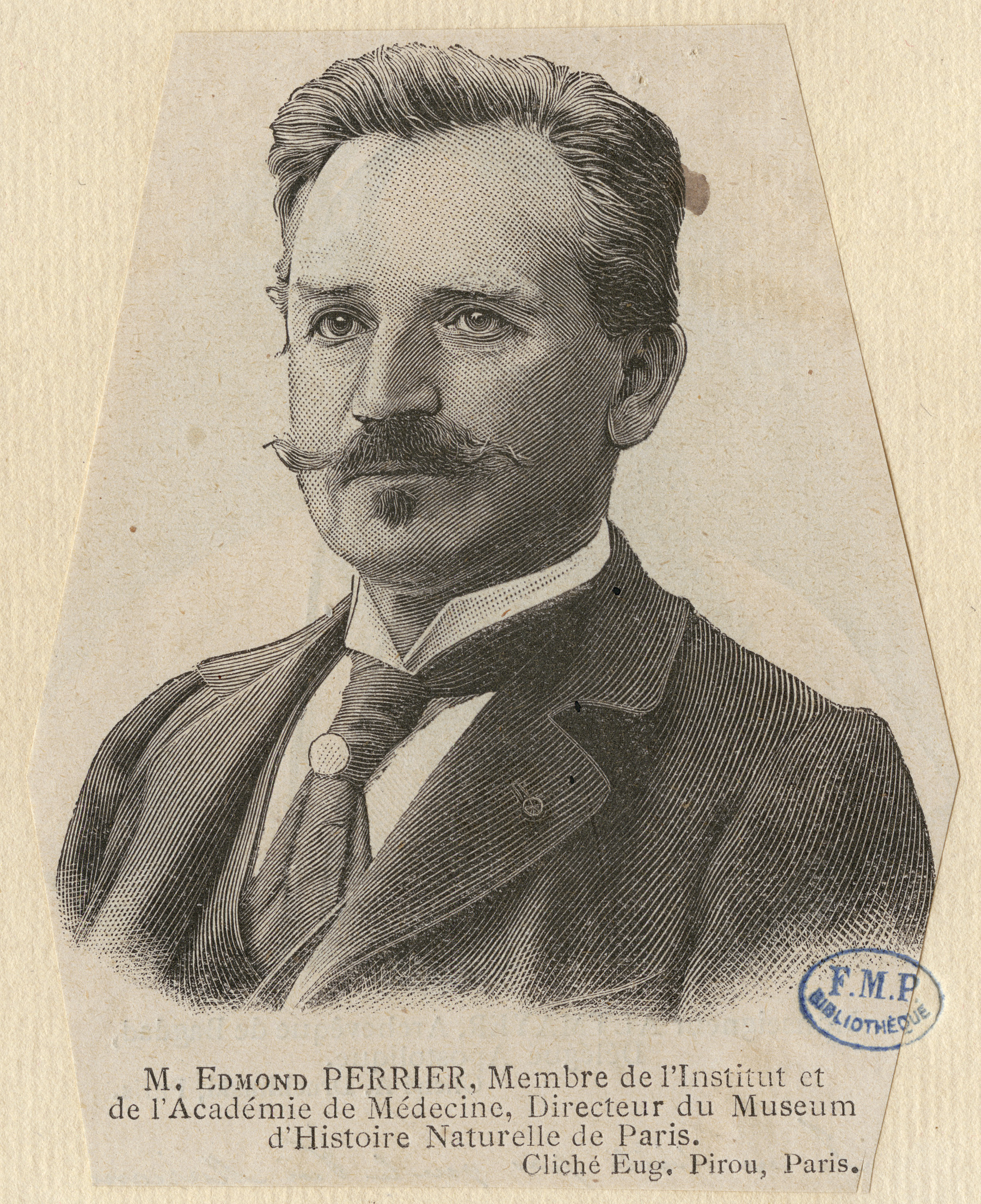
- Born: 9 May 1844; Tulle, France
- Died: 31 July 1921 (aged 77); Paris, France
- Scientific career
- Fields: Zoology
- Thesis: Recherches sur les pédicellaires et les ambulacres des astéries et des oursins (1869)
- Author abbrev. (zoology): Perrier

Jean Octave Edmond Perrier (9 May 1844 – 31 July 1921) was a French zoologist born in Tulle. He is known for his studies of invertebrates (annelids and echinoderms). He was the brother of zoologist Rémy Perrier (1861–1936).

== Career ==
On advice from Louis Pasteur, he studied sciences at the École Normale Supérieure, where he took classes in zoology from Henri de Lacaze-Duthiers (1821–1901). Afterwards he was a schoolteacher for three years at the college in Agen. In 1869 he obtained his doctorate in natural sciences, later replacing Lacaze-Duthiers at the École normale supérieure (1872).

In 1876 he attained the chair of Natural History (mollusks, worms and zoophytes) at the National Museum of Natural History, and in 1879 became chairman of the Société zoologique de France. In the early 1880s he participated in a series of sea expeditions, during which, he performed investigations of marine life located within the benthic zone, subsequently gaining international recognition as a specialist of marine fauna.

In 1892 he became a member of the Académie des sciences, and even though he was not a doctor of medicine, he became a member of the Académie nationale de médecine (1898). From 1900 to 1919 he was director of the museum of natural history, where during the same time period (1903), he succeeded Henri Filhol (1843–1902) as chair of comparative anatomy.

Perrier was deeply interested in the evolutionary theories of Charles Darwin and Jean-Baptiste Lamarck. In 1909 he was speaker at the inauguration of Lamarck's monument at the National Museum of Natural History. He believed Lamarck to be the true founder in regards to the theory of evolution.

== Selected writings ==
- Etudes sur l'organisation des Lombriciens terrestres, 1874 – Studies on the organization of terrestrial earthworms.
- La Philosophie zoologique avant Darwin, 1884 – Zoological philosophy prior to Darwin
- Les Coralliaires et les îles Madréporiques..., 1887 – The Coralline islands and Madreporaria.
- Lamarck et le transformisme actuel, 1893.
- Expéditions scientifiques du Travailleur et du Talisman pendant les années 1880, 1881, 1882, 1883 (1902) – Scientific expeditions of the Travailleur and the Talisman.
- La Femme dans la nature, dans les moeurs dans la légende, dans la société, 1910.
- La Terre avant l'Histoire. Les Origines de la Vie et de l'Homme, 1920.

== Founder of the Friends of the Natural History Museum ==
Perrier is the main founder of the Friends of the Natural History Museum Paris society, with Léon Bourgeois as the first president in office from 1907 to 1922.
