= John A. Ryder =

American zoologist and embryologist

John Adam Ryder
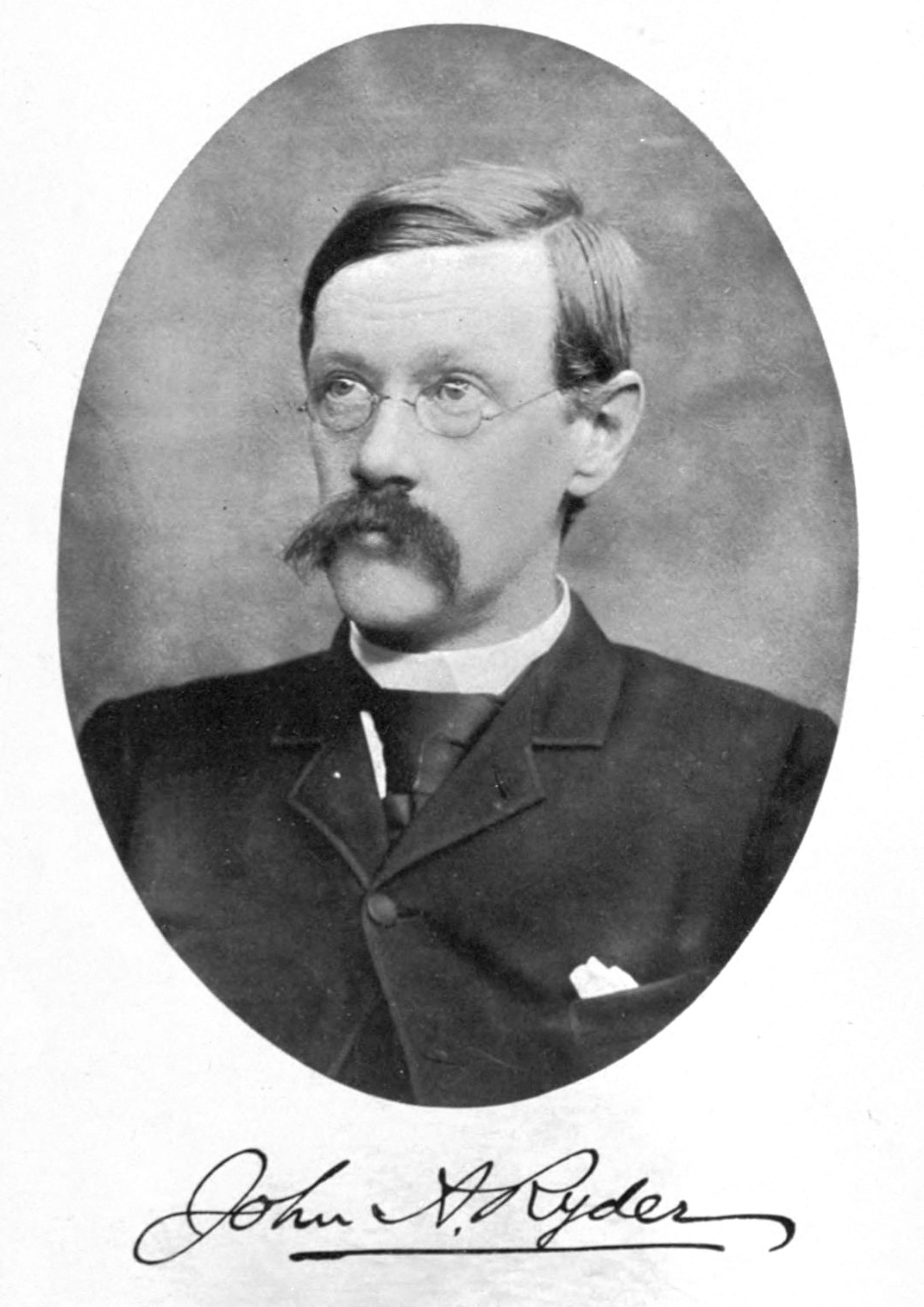

John Adam Ryder (February 29, 1852 in Franklin County, Pennsylvania – March 26, 1895), was an American zoologist and embryologist. He worked for the United States Fish Commission from 1880 to 1886 and a Professor of Comparative Embryology at the University of Pennsylvania from 1886 to 1895.

He was elected as a member to the American Philosophical Society in 1886.

== See also ==
- Category:Taxa named by John A. Ryder
