= Léon Bertin =

French zoologist (1896–1956)

Léon Bertin (8 April 1896, Paris – 5 February 1956, Saint-Amand-de-Vendôme) was a French zoologist. He was born in the 14th arrondissement of Paris, and died in the Loir-et-Cher Department of France, in a car accident.

== Biography ==
From 1914, Bertin studied at the École normale supérieure. He was granted his licence en sciences in 1917, and his agrégation in 1920. In 1925, he received his doctorate with a thesis entitled French: Recherches bionomiques, biométriques et systématiques sur les épinoches (Gastérostéidés) ("Bionomic, biometric and systematic research on sticklebacks (Gasterosteidae)".

Bertin studied under Alfred Lacroix (1863 – 1948) in the Geology Laboratories of the National Museum of Natural History in Paris, and studied invertebrates under Louis Eugène Bouvier (1856 – 1944). In 1938, after working as a lab assistant at the Faculty of Science, he moved to the Herpetology Laboratory of the Museum, working for Louis Roule (1861 – 1942), who was followed by Jacques Pellegrin (1873 – 1944) on his retirement. In 1949 he was President of the French Zoological Society.

== Publications ==
Bertin is most remembered as the author of the 1921 work L’Atlas des poissons marins, Regards sur la nature et ses mystères, La systématique et la biologie des épinoches ("Atlas of Marine Fish, Detailing their Habits and Mysteries, The Life Cycle and Biology of Sticklebacks"). He specialised in deepwater fauna.

Other works include:

- Perrier, Rémy (1924). "Sur les poissons" [On Fish]. La Faune de la France en tableaux synoptiques illustrés [Animals of France in Illustrated Tabular Synopses] (in French). Paris: Delagrave. New editions 1980 and 1998.
- Manipulations zoologiques. À l'usage du P.C.N., des écoles normales et des candidats au brevet supérieur et au professorat des écoles normales [Zoological manipulations. On the use of P.C.N., from secondary schools and by students in higher schools and teachers in secondary schools] (in French). Universities of France. 1926. Reissued 1930.
- Perrier, Rémy (1926). "Sur les lépidoptères" [On Lepidoptera]. La Faune de la France en tableaux synoptiques illustrés [Animals of France in Illustrated Tabular Synopses] (in French). Paris: Delagrave. New edition 1979.
- Perrier, Rémy; Berland, Lucien (1929). "Sur les arachnides et les crustacés" [On Arachnidae and Crustacea]. La Faune de la France en tableaux synoptiques illustrés [Animals of France in Illustrated Tabular Synopses]. Paris: Delagrave. New edition 1979.
- Bertin, Léon (1939). Géologie et paléontologie. À l'usage : des élèves aux écoles normales primaires et primaires supérieures, des élèves et candidats à l'Institut agronomique et aux écoles nationales d'agriculture, des candidats aux écoles normales supérieures et au S.P.C.N. [Geology and Paleontology. On usage: Students in primary and secondary schools, students and candidates of the Agricultural Institute, and of the National Schools of Agriculture candidates of the écoles normales supérieres and of the S.P.C.N.] (in French). Paris: Larousse.
- Bertin, Léon (1942). Les Anguilles, variation, croissance, euryhalinité, toxicité, hermaphrodisme juvénile et sexualité, migrations, métamorphoses... [Eels: Variation, growth, euryhalinity, toxicity, juvenile hermaphrodism and sexuality, migrations, metamorphoses...] (in French). Paris: Payot. New edition 1951.
- Bertin, Léon (1942). Petit atlas des poissons [Pocket Atlas of Fish] (in French). Watercolour illustrations by Charles Yver. Paris: Boubée. New edition 1946.
- Bertin, Léon; Berlioz, Jacques; Chopard, Lucien (1942). "Les Migrations animales" [Animal Migration]. L'Avenir de la Science (17). Paris: Gallimard.
- Bertin, Léon (1949). La Vie des animaux [Life of Animals] (in French). Vol. I. Paris: Larousse.
- Bertin, Léon (1950). La Vie des animaux [Life of Animals] (in French). Vol. IId. Paris: Larousse.
- Bertin, Léon (1950). "5. Ostariophysaires (Siluriformes)". Catalogue des types de poissons du Muséum national d'histoire naturelle [Catalogue of Fish Types in the National Museum of Natural History] (in French). Paris: Muséum national d'histoire naturelle.
- Bertin, Léon (1950). Regards sur la nature et ses mystères, la terre, les bêtes, l'homme et les monstres [On Nature and its Mysteries: Earth, Beasts, Man and Monsters] (in French). Paris: Pavillon.
- Bertin, Léon (1951). "6. Haplomes, hétéromes, catostéomes". Catalogue des types de poissons du Muséum national d'histoire naturelle [Catalogue of Fish Types in the National Museum of Natural History] (in French). Paris: Muséum national d'histoire naturelle.
- Bertin, Léon (1954). Les Poissons singuliers (in French). Introduction by Georges Duhamel; illustrations by Gisèle Mauger. Paris: Dunod.
- Bertin, Léon (1956). La Terre, notre planète [Earth, our planet] (in French). Paris: Larousse.

== Taxon described by him ==
- See Category:Taxa named by Léon Bertin

== Taxon named in his honor ==
The thread eel Serrivomer bertini is named after him.
