= Johannes Schmidt (biologist) =

Danish biologist

Ernst Johannes Schmidt
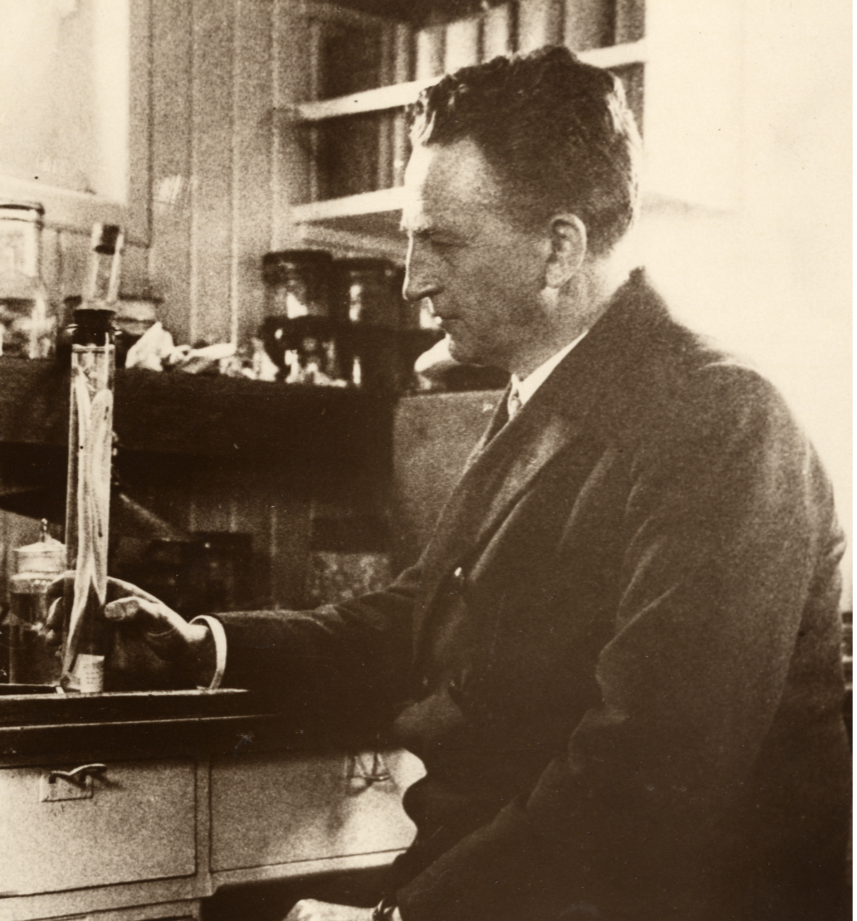
- Born: 2 January 1877; Jægerspris, Denmark
- Died: February 21, 1933 (aged 56); Copenhagen
- Occupation: Marine biologist
- Known for: Discovery of the spawning ground of the European Eel
- Spouse: Ingeborg Kühle
- Awards: Weldon Memorial Prize, 1923; Agassiz Medal, 1930; Darwin Medal, 1930; Galathea Medal, 1930; Geoffroy St. Hilaire Medal, 1931

Academic background
- Education: Biology
- Alma mater: University of Copenhagen
- Thesis: (1903)
- Doctoral advisor: Eugen Warming

Ernst Johannes Schmidt (2 January 1877 – 21 February 1933) was a Danish biologist credited with discovering in 1920 that European eels migrate to the Sargasso Sea to spawn. Before this, people in North America and Europe had wondered where the small glass eels, or elvers, came from.

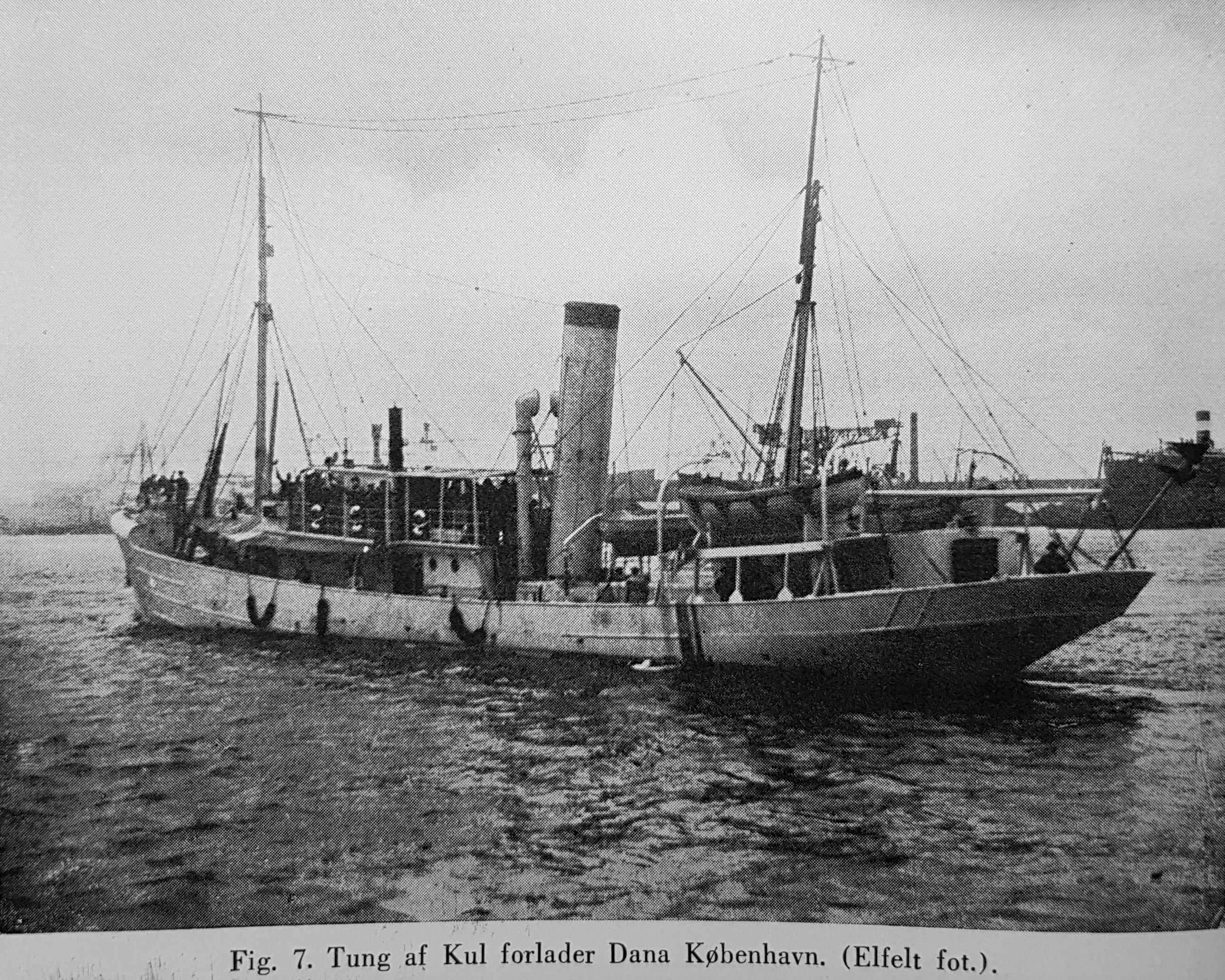
Danish research vessel Dana leaving Copenhagen in 1928 at the start of the Dana Expedition

== Biography ==
Schmidt was born at Jægerspris, Denmark, son of Ernst Schmidt and Camilla Ellen Sophie Schmidt (born Kjeldall and sister to the chemist Johan Kjeldahl). Schmidt began his studies of natural history at the University of Copenhagen under professor of botany Eugen Warming (1841–1924), and obtained an MS degree in biology in 1898. He obtained a grant from the Carlsberg Foundation to study the flora of the coastal areas of Ko Chang in then Siam, including both mangrove trees and microalgae. He made his doctoral thesis in biology and botany, on shoot architecture of mangrove trees and Eugen Warming served as faculty opponent in October 1903.

Schmidt then more or less switched to marine zoology, working 1902–1909 part-time for the Botanical Institute of the University of Copenhagen, part-time for the Danish Commission for Investigation of the Sea. In 1909, he was made head of the department of physiology at the Carlsberg Laboratory, a post he held until his early death.

Schmidt worked in parallel on phycology, where he described the genus Richelia (filamentous heterocyst-forming Cyanobacteria dwelling inside diatoms), on plant physiology and genetics, especially of hops, and on large-scale oceanography and ichthyology.

Beginning in 1904, Johannes Schmidt led a series of expeditions into the Mediterranean Sea and the North Atlantic to investigate eels. At the time it was believed that the European eel spawned in the Mediterranean Sea, as this was the only place where eel larvae had been observed. However, the first Thor expedition to the North Atlantic, led by Schmidt, caught the first eel larvae ever observed in the Atlantic Ocean, on a position west of the Faroe Islands. This discovery was defining for Schmidt's career and he conducted a series of expeditions in the following years to search for the elusive spawning grounds of the eel. He did this by systematically trawling the deep sea of the Atlantic, always moving in the direction where he found the smallest larvae. In 1921, on the second Dana expedition, he finally located the spawning grounds to the Sargasso Sea. In 1928–1930, he led the third Dana Expedition, funded by the Carlsberg Foundation, being a two-year voyage around the world's oceans.

A peculiar incident is worthy of notice: a paper on the life-history of the eel, published 1912 in Germany, had first been sent to London to be published by the Royal Society, but was refused with a note that Grassi's work on the subject sufficed. This constitutes a clear example of peer review failure. Ten years later, Schmidt's work on the spawning place of the eel was published by the Royal Society and even later he was awarded the Darwin Medal.

== Personal life ==
In 1903 he married Ingeborg Kühle (1880-1958), daughter of Søren Anton van der Aa Kühle (1849-1906), chief director of the Old Carlsberg Brewery. Schmidt died in Copenhagen on 21 February, 1933, of influenza. He is buried at Vestre Kirkegård.

== Honours ==
- Fellow of the Royal Danish Academy of Sciences and Letters
- Honorary doctor, University of Liverpool, 1923
- Oxford University's Weldon Memorial Prize, 1923
- Honorary fellow, Royal Society of Edinburgh, 1927
- Darwin Medal, 1930
- Alexander Agassiz Medal, 1930
- Galathea Medal, 1930
- Geoffroy Saint-Hilaire Medal, 1931

== Taxon named in his honor ==
- The Black Sea pelagic pipefish Syngnathus schmidti is named after him.
- The eel Serrivomer schmidti. Although not identified by name, it was probably named in honor of Schmidt, because it was he who led the Dana fishery research cruises of which during the type specimen was collected.
- Diaphus schmidti, Tåning, 1932 is a species of lanternfish found in the Pacific Ocean.

== Taxon described by him ==
- See Category:Taxa named by Johannes Schmidt (biologist)
