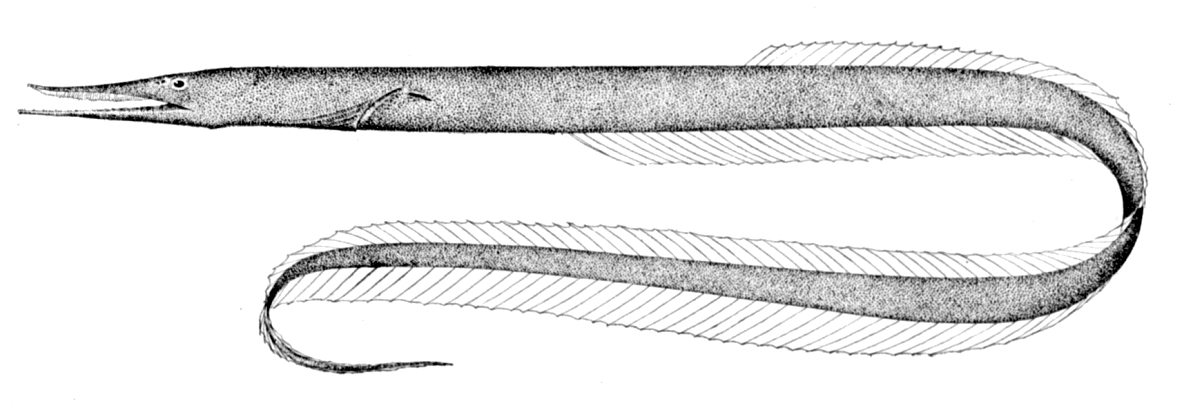
- Bean's Sawtooth Eel, Serrivomer beanii. From plate 47 of Oceanic Ichthyology by George Brown Goode and Tarleton Hoffman Bean, published 1896.

Scientific classification
- Kingdom: Animalia
- Phylum: Chordata
- Class: Actinopterygii
- Division: Teleostei
- Order: Anguilliformes
- Suborder: Anguilloidei
- Family: Serrivomeridae; Trewavas, 1932

Genera
- Serrivomer; Stemonidium

= Sawtooth eel =

Sawtooth eels

Family of fishes

Sawtooth eels are a family, Serrivomeridae, of eels found in temperate and tropical seas worldwide. They are deepwater pelagic fish.

== Etymology ==
The Serrivomeridae are named from the Latin roots Serra, meaning saw, and vomer, meaning plowshare, that in this case refers to the bone found in the front part of the roof of the mouth. This name makes reference to the arrangement of vomerine teeth common to this family.

== Anatomy ==
Mouth of Serrivomer beanii opened to show the vomerine teeth.

The vomerine teeth of sawtooth eels are arranged in a saw-like, fused structure running in a line along the length of their long, slender jaws.

== Genera ==
The 11 species are found in these two genera:

Family Serrivomeridae

- Genus Serrivomer T. N. Gill & Ryder, 1883
- Genus Stemonidium C. H. Gilbert, 1905
