= Marie-Louise Bauchot =

French ichthyologist (born 1928)

Marie-Louise Bauchot (born 1928) is a French ichthyologist and assistant manager of the National Museum of Natural History, France.

== Taxon described by her ==
- See Category:Taxa named by Marie-Louise Bauchot

== Selected publications ==
- Status of Abudefduf sexfasciatus (Lacépède), a Pomacentrid Fish from the Indo-West Pacific (in Ichthyological Notes) Gerald R. Allen; Marie-Louise Bauchot; Martine Desoutter Copeia, Vol. 1978, 2. (May 5, 1978), pp. 328–30.
- Marie-Louise Bauchot, Jacques Daget & Roland Bauchot, « Ichthyology in France at the Beginning of the 19th Century : The 'Histoire Naturelle des Poissons' of Cuvier (1769-1832) and Valenciennes (1794-1865) », in Collection building in ichthyology and herpetology (PIETSCH T.W.ANDERSON W.D., dir.; American Society of Ichthyologists and Herpetologists : 27–80), 1997 (ISBN 0-935868-91-7(
- Blache, J. and M.-L. Bauchot, 1972 Contribution à la connaissance des poissons Anguilliformes de la côte occidentale d'Afrique. 13e note: les genres Verma, Apterichthus, Ichthyapus, Hemerorhinus, Caecula, Dalophis avec la description de deux genres nouveaux (Fam. des Ophichthidae). Bulletin de l'Institut Francais d'Afrique Noire (Sér A) Sciences Naturelles v. 34 (no. 3): 692-773.
- >Bauchot-Boutin, M.-L., 1953 (July) Révision synoptique du genre Serrivomer (Anguilliformes). Bulletin du Muséum National d'Histoire Naturelle (Série 2) v. 25 (no. 4): 365-367.
- Bauchot, M.-L. and A. L. Maugé, 1980 (31 Dec.) Muraenichthys erythraeensis n. sp. de mer Rouge et première mention de Muraenichthys laticaudata (Ogilby, 1897) en mer Rouge (Pisces, Anguilliformes, Ophichthidae). Bulletin du Museum National d'Histoire Naturelle Ser. 4: Section A: Zoologie, Biologie et Écologie Animales v. 2 (no. 3): 933-939.

== Taxon named in her honor ==
- The species of eel Ariosoma bauchotae Karrer, 1983 is named after her.
- The comb-tooth blenny Microlipophrys bauchotae (Wirtz & Bath, 1982) is named after her.
- Plectranthias bauchotae J. E. Randall, 1980 is a species of fish in the family Serranidae occurring in the Western Indian Ocean.
- The sciaenid Paranebris bauchotae, known only from the Pacific coast of Panama.
