= Luiz Saldanha =

Portuguese marine biologist and oceanographer (1937–1997)

- Born: Luiz Vieira Caldas Saldanha; December 16, 1937; Lisbon, Portugal
- Died: November 16, 1997 (aged 59); Cascais, Portugal
- Citizenship: Portugal
- Education: Lycée français Charles Lepierre (Lisbon)
- Alma mater: Faculty of Sciences, University of Lisbon
- Known for: International oceanographic expeditions; deep-sea and hydrothermal-vent research Research on Atlantic Northeast marine fauna and marine ecology Marine-science institution-building in Portugal
- Awards: Commander of the Ordre des Palmes Académiques (France); Officer of the Order of Grimaldi (Monaco); Maritime Personality of the Year - Manley Bendall Award (Académie de marine, France); Grande Médaille Albert Ier (Monaco, 1988); Tridente d'Oro (International Academy of Underwater Sciences and Techniques, Italy, 1990); Grand Officer of the Order of Saint James of the Sword (Portugal, posthumous, 1999)
- Scientific career
- Fields: Marine biology • Oceanography • Marine ecology

Luiz Vieira Caldas Saldanha (16 December 1937 – 16 November 1997) was a Portuguese marine biologist, oceanographer and university professor at the Faculty of Sciences, University of Lisbon. He was noted for research on marine fauna of the Atlantic Northeast and for his participation in international oceanographic campaigns and institutions, as well as for his role in developing and coordinating marine science and technology in Portugal.

Saldanha took part in oceanographic campaigns and expeditions across multiple ocean basins and regions worldwide, and worked for extended periods with research institutions in countries including France, the United Kingdom, the United States and Monaco. From 1969, he also conducted deep-sea research using crewed submersibles such as the French Archimède and Nautile and the American Alvin, playing a decisive role in the discovery of the first hydrothermal vents and seamounts of the Azores.

In Portugal, Saldanha helped establish university-level teaching in several areas of marine biology, including ichthyology and biological oceanography, and trained numerous marine biologists who later became researchers and lecturers in Portugal and abroad. He played a central role in strengthening marine-science infrastructure and coordination, notably through the revitalisation and direction of the Guia Marine Laboratory in Cascais (1974–1997). He also held senior institutional posts, including president of the National Institute for Fisheries Research (INIP), and served in leadership roles within Portuguese and international scientific organisations.

== Biography ==
=== Early life and education ===
Saldanha was born on 16 December 1937 in Lisbon (São Sebastião da Pedreira). He attended the Lycée français Charles Lepierre in Lisbon, where he completed primary and secondary education. In those years he took part in a Scout group connected to the Church of Saint Louis of the Frenchmen (Lisbon), fostering an interest in nature exploration. He was a nephew of the archaeologist Eduardo da Cunha Serrão and accompanied him on excavations and other archaeological work from an early age, which contributed to his scientific curiosity. According to family testimony, his later interest in animal life and biology was primarily self-motivated.

=== Diving and early oceanographic work ===
As a young man, Saldanha became one of the pioneers of scuba diving in Portugal. In 1956, aged 18 and already a university student, he made his first dive off Sesimbra using borrowed equipment and without a wetsuit. A few months later, invited by Mário Ruivo of the Instituto de Biologia Marinha (Institute of Marine Biology), he joined his first oceanographic campaign aboard the naval vessel Faial, where he met visiting foreign researchers and began corresponding with them.

=== Academic career, military service and museums ===
In 1961, Saldanha graduated in Biological Sciences from the Faculty of Sciences (University of Lisbon), completing his final courses while performing extended military service as an army officer. In 1962, already married, he was posted to Angola during the Portuguese Colonial War and remained there for two years and three months (1962–1965), in the Northern Intervention Zone (ZIN). Alongside military duties, he carried out scientific collecting and improved his taxidermy techniques, later depositing specimens at the Museu Bocage (now part of the National Museum of Natural History and Science, Lisbon).

After completing military service in 1965, he began his professional career (aged 27) as a naturalist at the Museu Bocage. He remained there until 1970, when he moved to the Zoological and Anthropological Museum and Laboratory of the Faculty of Sciences as a researcher.

In 1974 he completed a PhD in Sciences (Animal Ecology) at the Faculty of Sciences, graduating with distinction, and began a long teaching career at the same faculty: assistant professor (1975), extraordinary professor (1978) and full professor (1979).

=== Guia Marine Laboratory ===
In 1974, the same year he earned his doctorate, Saldanha led the recovery of the Fort of Nossa Senhora da Guia in Cascais, where he reactivated and developed the Guia Marine Laboratory (Portuguese: Laboratório Marítimo da Guia). He requested the fort's classification as a Property of Public Interest in April 1974, approved in 1977, and supervised research and undergraduate field projects there in marine biology and biological oceanography. He directed the laboratory from 1974 until his death in 1997.

=== Research and science communication ===
Saldanha's research and oceanographic campaigns were not limited to Portuguese waters. He worked for extended periods in laboratories in France, the United Kingdom, the United States and Monaco, and participated in expeditions in the Mediterranean Sea, the Atlantic Ocean, the Arctic Ocean, the Indian Ocean, the Pacific Ocean and Antarctica. The breadth of these voyages led some Portuguese media to refer to him as the “man of the seven seas”.

From 1969, he regularly dived using the French submersibles Archimède and Nautile and the American Alvin to study deep-sea biology and hydrothermal fauna. In 1992, aboard Alvin, he was responsible for identifying the first of the hydrothermal vents and seamounts of the Azores, the Lucky Strike hydrothermal field.

Beyond marine work, he also carried out terrestrial expeditions in desert regions, often travelling with traditional caravans, and paid attention to the human and ethnographic aspects of the communities he encountered.

In March 1978, a fire at the Faculty of Sciences building (then at the former Lisbon Polytechnic School) destroyed Saldanha's laboratory and much of his equipment, manuscripts, notes, books and reprints, as well as most of the zoological collection he had assembled in Angola, causing significant delays to ongoing scientific work.

Saldanha placed strong emphasis on science communication. He delivered numerous lectures in Portugal and abroad, served on editorial and review boards of scientific journals, and authored documentary series for RTP, the Portuguese public service broadcaster, including Missão Açores (1984) and O Mar e a Terra (1985, 1987).

=== Nature conservation ===
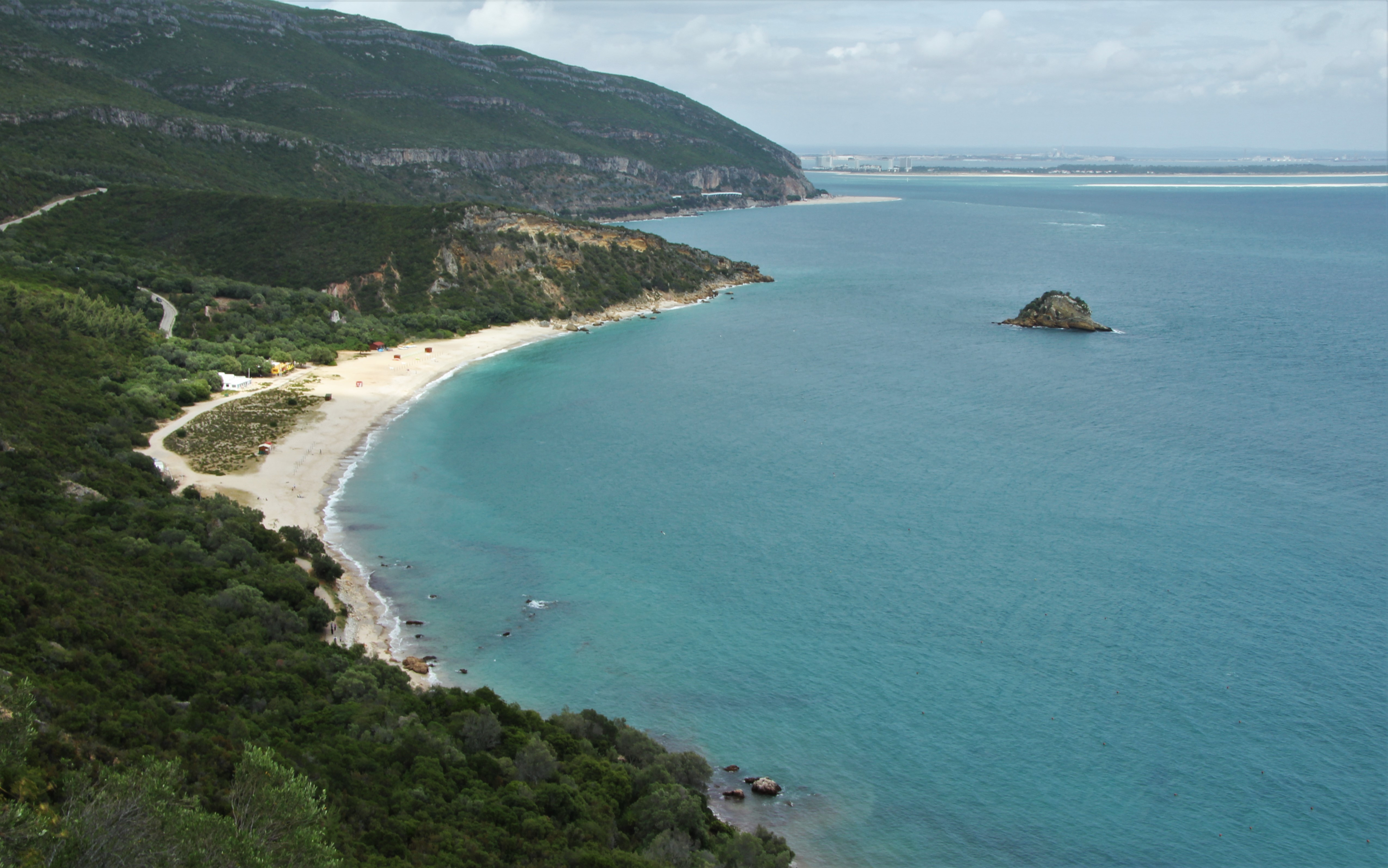
View from the Serra da Arrábida over the waters later included in the Professor Luiz Saldanha Marine Park.

Committed to nature conservation from early on, in 1965 Saldanha and colleagues from the Portuguese Centre for Underwater Activities (CPAS) submitted a proposal to the Navy Ministry calling for a marine reserve along the coast of the Serra da Arrábida. Although the proposal was not adopted at the time, 33 years later, in 1998, the area proposed by Saldanha was designated the Professor Luiz Saldanha Marine Park, within the Arrábida Natural Park.

He collaborated with organisations dedicated to conservation, notably the Liga para a Protecção da Natureza (LPN), serving as president of its board (1985–1987) and later president of its general assembly.

=== Institutional leadership roles ===
Saldanha held several institutional leadership positions nationally and internationally. In 1987 he became president of the National Institute for Fisheries Research (INIP), an organisation later integrated into the Instituto Português do Mar e da Atmosfera (IPMA). As noted above, he was also president of LPN's board (1985–1987) and later president of its general assembly.

He served as vice-president of the International Council for the Exploration of the Sea (ICES), as a delegate in European marine science programmes, and as a member of scientific bodies connected to the Institut océanographique of Monaco and the Oceanographic Museum. He also worked with international scientific academies and European science organisations.

In 1991 he promoted the creation of the Instituto do Mar (IMAR), with the aim of gathering marine-science researchers in Portugal, and served as its first president of the board and scientific council.

=== Artistic interests ===
Saldanha maintained a notable artistic practice alongside his scientific career. During expeditions he kept illustrated diaries with watercolours and coloured pencil drawings depicting landscapes, observed species and notable moments, some of which were later exhibited and published.

He also collected and crafted miniature lead soldiers, creating and painting historically themed dioramas; the quality of this work earned awards at specialist exhibitions.

=== Death ===
Saldanha died on 16 November 1997 at his residence in Cascais after a prolonged illness. His death occurred on Portugal's National Sea Day, a date associated with public recognition of the oceans to which he dedicated his career.

== Honours and tributes ==
=== Honours received during his lifetime ===
During his lifetime, Saldanha received multiple honours, particularly from international organisations. Notable distinctions include:

- Grande Médaille Albert Ier (Monaco): awarded in 1988 by the Institut océanographique of Monaco in recognition of his contributions to marine science.
- Officer of the Order of Grimaldi (Monaco): awarded by Prince Rainier III of Monaco.
- Commander of the Ordre des Palmes Académiques (France), for teaching and scientific outreach.
- Manley Bendall "Maritime Personality of the Year Award" (France), awarded by the Académie de marine.
- Tridente d'Oro (Italy), awarded in 1990 by the International Academy of Underwater Sciences and Techniques (Italian: Accademia Internazionale di Scienze e Tecniche Subacquee).

=== Posthumous tributes ===
After his death, Saldanha was widely honoured for his legacy. Major tributes include:

- Professor Luiz Saldanha Marine Park: created in 1998 and named in his honour as the first marine reserve on mainland Portugal, integrated in the Arrábida Natural Park.
- Luiz Saldanha Oceanographic Museum (Setúbal area): the oceanographic museum at Fort Santa Maria da Arrábida bears his name.
- Saldanha Hydrothermal Field and "Missão Saldanha": in 1998 an expedition led by Fernando Barriga discovered a seamount and hydrothermal vent system in the Azores region, named in his honour.
- Lisbon Oceanarium: in 1998 a venue space was named “Sala Professor Luiz Saldanha”; after the Oceanarium concession changed in 2016, it was renamed “Sala Sophia de Mello Breyner”.
- Professor Luiz Saldanha Library: in 1999 the Funchal City Council created a specialised library with his scientific collection at the Funchal Marine Biology Station, later enriched with Armando J. Almeida's collection (2011).
- Grand Officer of the Order of Saint James of the Sword: awarded posthumously on 28 October 1999 by President Jorge Sampaio.
- CTT Post of Portugal: on 16 November 1999, a commemorative “Sea Day” postcard was issued with his image.
- Lisbon Geographic Society: on the same date, the society opened the exhibition Luiz Saldanha: Naturalista do Século XX at its museum.
- National Museum of Natural History and Science and the Guia Marine Laboratory: in December 2007 these institutions held a session marking the tenth anniversary of his death, and launched the book Luiz Saldanha e o Laboratório Marítimo da Guia (Armando J. Almeida and Pilar Pereira).

==== Recent tributes ====
- Funchal municipality: on 16 November 2021, Funchal again marked the anniversary of his death as part of Sea Day commemorations, with an evocative session at the Funchal Marine Biology Station.
- Sesimbra municipality: on 7 May 2022 he was posthumously awarded the "Medalhão da Vila de Sesimbra" for his role in identifying and helping protect dinosaur track sites at Cape Espichel (Pedra da Mua, Lagosteiros and Pedreira do Avelino).
- Vasco da Gama Aquarium: on 6 June 2023, he was honoured at the launch of the book Missão Oceanográfica Arquipélago da Madeira 1984, which reproduces drawings and watercolours from his diary and underwater photography from Jorge Albuquerque, also honoured at the event.

==== Toponymy ====
Saldanha's name has been used in local toponymy, including a street in Cascais (Bairro do Rosário) and a street in Tavira (Santa Luzia parish).

=== Taxa named after Saldanha ===
Saldanha has also been honoured in biological nomenclature, with species and subspecies named after him:

- Charaxes lucretius saldanhai (Bivar de Sousa, 1983) – Angolan butterfly subspecies.
- Coloconger saldanhai (Quéro, 2001) – species of eel in genus Coloconger.
- Geocharis saldanhai (A. Serrano & Aguiar, 2001) – beetle species.
- Ilyophis saldanhai (Karmovskaya & Parin, 1999) – eel species.
- Ophidion saldanhai (Matallanas & Brito, 1999) – fish species recorded from Cabo Verde and the Gulf of Guinea region.
- Pachycara saldanhai (Biscoito & Almeida, 2004) – deep-sea fish species.
- Puellina saldanhai (Harmelin, 2001) – microscopic marine animal recorded from southern Portugal.

== Selected works ==
Saldanha published around 130 scientific works in Portuguese and international journals, and five books. Due to the long list of publications, only a selection is provided here.

- 1959 – Alguns processos usuais para a preparação e conservação de animais marinhos. Naturália, 8(1): 1–14.
- 1959 – Como nasceu a secção de estudos submarinos da Sociedade Portuguesa de Ciências Naturais. Naturália, 8(1): 1–5.
- 1960 – Recordando a Zoologia. CPAS. Revista Portuguesa de Actividades Subaquáticas, 2: 1–2.
- 1962 – Exploração submarina. O Sesimbrense, 359: 1, 3.
- 1965 – Sobre três espécies de teleósteos (Nettastomidae e Notacanthidae) novas para a Costa de Portugal. Notas e Estudos do Instituto de Biologia Marinha, 32/3: 1–18.
- 1965 – As espécies cinegéticas do Norte de Angola. Caça e tiro ao voo, 7: 32–33, 36.
- 1965 – Como colher, preparar e conservar animais marinhos. Boletim do Centro Português de Actividades Subaquáticas, 11: 8–9.
- 1966 – Fauna do Nordeste de Angola. Geographica (Bulletin of the Lisbon Geographic Society), Year II, no. 8: 2–15.
- 1967 – Vasos cerâmicos de Angola. Geographica, Year III, no. 10: 35–56.
- 1968 – Noroeste de Angola. Geographica, Year IV, no. 13: 71–85.
- 1971 – Observations bionomiques à “Pedra da Anixa”. Bulletin de l’Association des professeurs de Biologie–Géologie, Suppl. 201: 127–132.
- 1973 – La côte du Mozambique. Résultats d’une exploration zoologique préliminaire. Bulletin du Muséum national d’Histoire naturelle (Paris), (3), 158, Écologie générale, 14: 249–259.
- 1974 – Estudo do povoamento dos horizontes da rocha litoral da costa da Arrábida. Museu Bocage (PhD thesis).
- 1974 – Sobre a forma das grandes profundidades marinhas e sua origem. Museu Bocage (doctoral complementary examination).
- 1980 – Fauna Submarina Atlântica. Publicações Europa-América.
- 1980 – Estudo ambiental do estuário do Tejo: povoamentos bentónicos, peixes e ictioplancton do estuário do Tejo. Comissão Nacional do Ambiente/Tejo, no. 5 – Report 4.
- 1982 – O rei D. Carlos pioneiro da Oceanografia europeia. Revista de Marinha, no. 110: 3–8.
- 1986 – A protecção e a conservação do meio marinho. In Que futuro para a costa Sudoeste (Ambiente em discussão 1), pp. 51–55. Liga para a Protecção da Natureza.
- 1988 – A protecção e a conservação do meio marinho nos Açores e na Madeira. Primeiras Jornadas Atlânticas de Protecção do Meio Ambiente, pp. 315–317. Angra do Heroísmo.
- 1989 – Euskal Herriko itsas sakonetaro fauna (Fauna marinha profunda do País Basco). Krisaly, 101 pp.
- 1992 – Um parque marinho no Espichel. Sesimbra cultural, 2: 41–43.
- 1993 – Prince Albert of Monaco and King Carlos of Portugal: Their contribution to the knowledge of the Atlantic deep-sea fauna. Abstracts of the V International Congress on the History of Oceanography, 1 p.
- 1994 – Germano da Fonseca Sacarrão – Um Biólogo Marinho, um Grande Amigo. In Professor Germano da Fonseca Sacarrão (1914–1992). Museu Bocage, pp. 73–86.
- 1995 – Fauna submarina Atlântica: Portugal continental, Açores, Madeira (2nd ed., revised and expanded). Publicações Europa-América.
- 1997 – One hundred years of Portuguese Oceanography in the footsteps of King Carlos Bragança. Museu Bocage.

== See also ==
- Hydrothermal vents and seamounts of the Azores – includes the Monte Saldanha hydrothermal field and the 1992 discovery of Lucky Strike.
- Arrábida Natural Park – protected area including the marine zone later named for Saldanha.
- Fort of Nossa Senhora da Guia (Cascais) – fort currently hosting a maritime laboratory linked to the University of Lisbon.
