= Coloconger meadi =

Scientific classification
- Domain: Eukaryota
- Kingdom: Animalia
- Phylum: Chordata
- Class: Actinopterygii
- Order: Anguilliformes
- Family: Colocongridae
- Genus: Coloconger
- Species: C. meadi

Binomial name
- Coloconger meadi Kanazawa, 1957

Species of fish

Coloconger meadi is an eel in the family Colocongridae (worm eels/short-tail eels). It was described by Robert H. Kanazawa in 1957. It is a marine, deep-water dwelling eel from the Gulf of Mexico and Suriname in the western central Atlantic Ocean. It dwells at a depth range of 650–925 m. Males can reach a maximum total length of 37.7 cm.

== Etymology ==
The eel is named in honor of ichthyologist Giles W. Mead (1928-2003), who sent the type specimen to Kanazawa.
