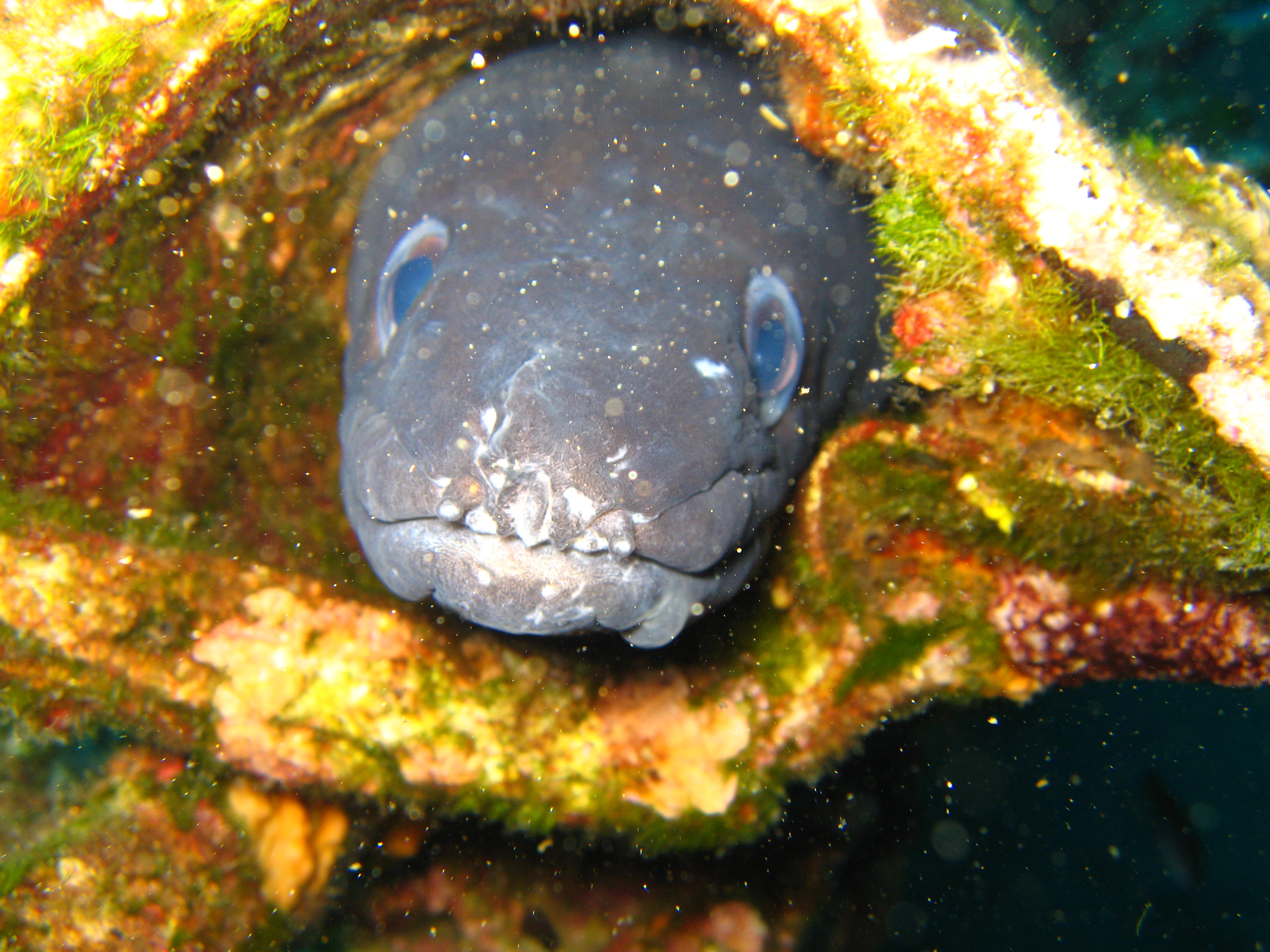
- European conger, Conger conger

Scientific classification
- Kingdom: Animalia
- Phylum: Chordata
- Class: Actinopterygii
- Order: Anguilliformes
- Suborder: Congroidei; Bleeker, 1864

Families
- See text

= Congroidei =

Suborder of fishes

Congroidei is a suborder of ray-finned fishes belonging to the order Anguilliformes, the eels. These eels are mostly marine, although a few species of snake eel will enter freshwater, and they are found in tropical and temperate waters throughout the world.

== Families and subfamiles ==
Congroidei contains the following extant families and subfamilies:

- Family Colocongridae D. G. Smith, 1976 (shorttail eels)
- Family Derichthyidae Gill, 1884 (longneck eels or narrowneck eels)
- Family Ophichthidae Günther, 1870 (snake eels and worm eels)
  - Subfamily Myrophinae Kaup, 1856 (worm eels)
  - Subfamily Ophichthinae Günther, 1870 (snake eels)
- Family Muraenesocidae Kaup, 1859 (pike conger eels)
- Family Nettastomatidae Kaup, 1859 (duckbill eels)
- Family Congridae Kaup, 1856 (conger eels)
  - Subfamily Congrinae Kaup, 1856 (congers)
  - Subfamily Bathymyrinae J. E. Böhlke, 1949
  - Subfamily Heterocongrinae Günther, 1870 (garden eels)
