= Coloconger cadenati =

Scientific classification
- Domain: Eukaryota
- Kingdom: Animalia
- Phylum: Chordata
- Class: Actinopterygii
- Order: Anguilliformes
- Family: Colocongridae
- Genus: Coloconger
- Species: C. cadenati

Binomial name
- Coloconger cadenati Kanazawa, 1961

Species of fish

Coloconger cadenati is an eel in the family Colocongridae (worm eels/short-tail eels). It was described by Robert H. Kanazawa in 1961. It is a marine, deep-water dwelling eel which is known from Senegal to the Gulf of Guinea in the eastern Atlantic Ocean. It is known from a depth range of 270–600 m. Males can reach a maximum total length of 90 cm. The diet of C. cadenati consists primarily of benthic crustaceans.

== Etymology ==
The eel is named in honor of ichthyologist Jean Cadenat (1908-1992), who was the Director of the Marine Biological Section of the Institut Français d’Afrique Noire in Gorée, Senegal, who supplied the type specimen.
