= Coloconger japonicus =

Scientific classification
- Domain: Eukaryota
- Kingdom: Animalia
- Phylum: Chordata
- Class: Actinopterygii
- Order: Anguilliformes
- Family: Colocongridae
- Genus: Coloconger
- Species: C. japonicus

Binomial name
- Coloconger japonicus Machida, 1984

Species of fish

Coloconger japonicus is a species of eels in the family Colocongridae (worm eels/short-tail eels). It was described by Yoshihiko Machida in 1984. It is a marine, deep-water dwelling eel which is known from the East China Sea. It dwells at a depth range of 750–760 metres. Males can reach a maximum total length of 56 centimetres.
