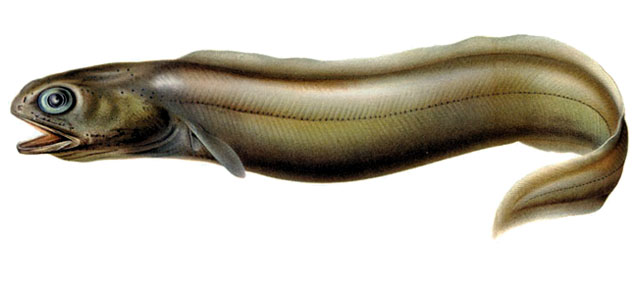

Scientific classification
- Domain: Eukaryota
- Kingdom: Animalia
- Phylum: Chordata
- Class: Actinopterygii
- Order: Anguilliformes
- Family: Colocongridae
- Genus: Coloconger
- Species: C. raniceps

Binomial name
- Coloconger raniceps Alcock, 1889

= Froghead eel =

Species of fish

The froghead eel (Coloconger raniceps) is an eel in the family Colocongridae (worm eels/short-tail eels). It was described by Alfred William Alcock in 1889. It is a marine, deep-water dwelling eel which is known from the Indo-west Pacific, including East Africa, Madagascar, and southern Japan. It dwells at a depth range of 300–1134 metres. Males can reach a maximum total length of 50 centimetres.
