= Coloconger eximia =

Scientific classification
- Domain: Eukaryota
- Kingdom: Animalia
- Phylum: Chordata
- Class: Actinopterygii
- Order: Anguilliformes
- Family: Colocongridae
- Genus: Coloconger
- Species: C. eximia

Binomial name
- Coloconger eximia (Castle, 1967)

Synonyms
- Ascomana eximia Castle, 1967

Species of fish

Coloconger eximia is an eel in the family Colocongridae (worm eels/short-tail eels). It was described by Peter Henry John Castle in 1967, originally under the genus Ascomana. It is a marine, deep-water dwelling eel which is known from Cape Peninsula, South Africa, in the southeastern Atlantic Ocean.

Coloconger eximia has one of the largest known fish larvae, growing to at least 70 cm (27.5 in). Their leptocephalus larvae are elongate, with a long, straight gut, a dorsal fin that originates in the latter half of the body, well-developed pectoral fins, and a long head.
