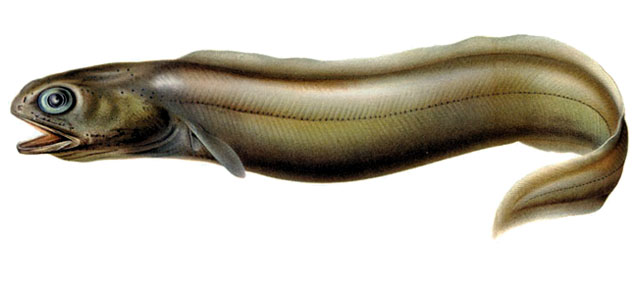
- Coloconger raniceps

Scientific classification
- Kingdom: Animalia
- Phylum: Chordata
- Class: Actinopterygii
- Division: Teleostei
- Order: Anguilliformes
- Suborder: Congroidei
- Family: Colocongridae; D. G. Smith, 1976
- Genus: Coloconger; Alcock, 1889

Species
- See text

= Coloconger =

Genus of short-tail eels

The Colocongridae, the worm eels or short-tail eels, are a family of eels, containing a single genus, Coloconger.

Colongrids are found in tropical waters of the Atlantic, Indian, and West Pacific oceans. They are bottom-dwelling fish, living in waters from 300 to 900 m (980 to 2,950 ft) in depth. Compared with other eels, they have relatively short and stubby bodies, with blunt snouts.

== Species ==
The ten known species are:

- Genus Coloconger
  - Coloconger cadenati Kanazawa, 1961
  - Coloconger canina (Castle & Raju, 1975)
  - Coloconger eximia (Castle, 1967)
  - Coloconger giganteus (Castle, 1959) (giant leptocephalus)
  - Coloconger japonicus Machida, 1984
  - Coloconger maculatus Ho, Tang & Chu, 2021
  - Coloconger meadi Kanazawa, 1957
  - Coloconger raniceps Alcock, 1889 (froghead eel)
  - Coloconger saldanhai (Quéro, 2001)
  - Coloconger scholesi W. L. Y. Chan, 1967 (Indo-Pacific short-tail conger)

== See also ==
- List of fish families
