= Indo-Pacific shorttail conger =

Conservation status
- Least Concern (IUCN 3.1)

Scientific classification
- Kingdom: Animalia
- Phylum: Chordata
- Class: Actinopterygii
- Order: Anguilliformes
- Family: Colocongridae
- Genus: Coloconger
- Species: C. scholesi

Binomial name
- Coloconger scholesi W. L. Y. Chan, 1967

Species of fish

The Indo-Pacific shorttail conger (Coloconger scholesi), also known as the short-tail conger, is an eel in the family Colocongridae (worm eels/short-tail eels). It was described by Chan William Lai-Yee in 1967. It is a marine, deep-water dwelling eel which is known from the Indo-Pacific, including southern Mozambique, Natal, South Africa, the South China Sea, and eastern Australia. It dwells at depths of 412–970 m (1,352–3,182 ft). It can reach a maximum total length of 51 centimetres (20 in).

== Etymology ==
The fish is named in honor of Patrick Scholes (ca. 1946–2011), of the Fisheries Laboratory, in Lowestoft, England, for his contributions to the fishery survey program in the South China Sea.
