= Coloconger canina =

Scientific classification
- Kingdom: Animalia
- Phylum: Chordata
- Class: Actinopterygii
- Order: Anguilliformes
- Family: Colocongridae
- Genus: Coloconger
- Species: C. canina

Binomial name
- Coloconger canina (Castle & Raju, 1975)

Synonyms
- Ascomana canina Castle & Raju, 1975

Species of eel

Coloconger canina is an eel in the family Colocongridae (worm eels/short-tail eels). It was described by Peter Henry John Castle and Solomon N. Raju in 1975. It is a marine, deep-water dwelling eel which is known from leptocephali collected from the Indian Ocean. It is known to dwell at a minimum depth of 300 m.
