= Coloconger saldanhai =

Scientific classification
- Kingdom: Animalia
- Phylum: Chordata
- Class: Actinopterygii
- Division: Teleostei
- Order: Anguilliformes
- Family: Colocongridae
- Genus: Coloconger
- Species: C. saldanhai

Binomial name
- Coloconger saldanhai Quéro, 2001

Species of fish

Coloconger saldanhai is an eel in the family Colocongridae (worm eels/short-tail eels). It was described by J.C. Quéro in 2001. It is a marine eel which is known from New Caledonia.

== Etymology ==
The fish is named in honor of Luiz Saldanha (1937-1997) who collaborated with Quéro and co-discovered this eel.
