= Fort of São Jorge at Oitavos =

Fort in Portugal

- Forte de São Jorge de Oitavos
- Lisbon in Portugal
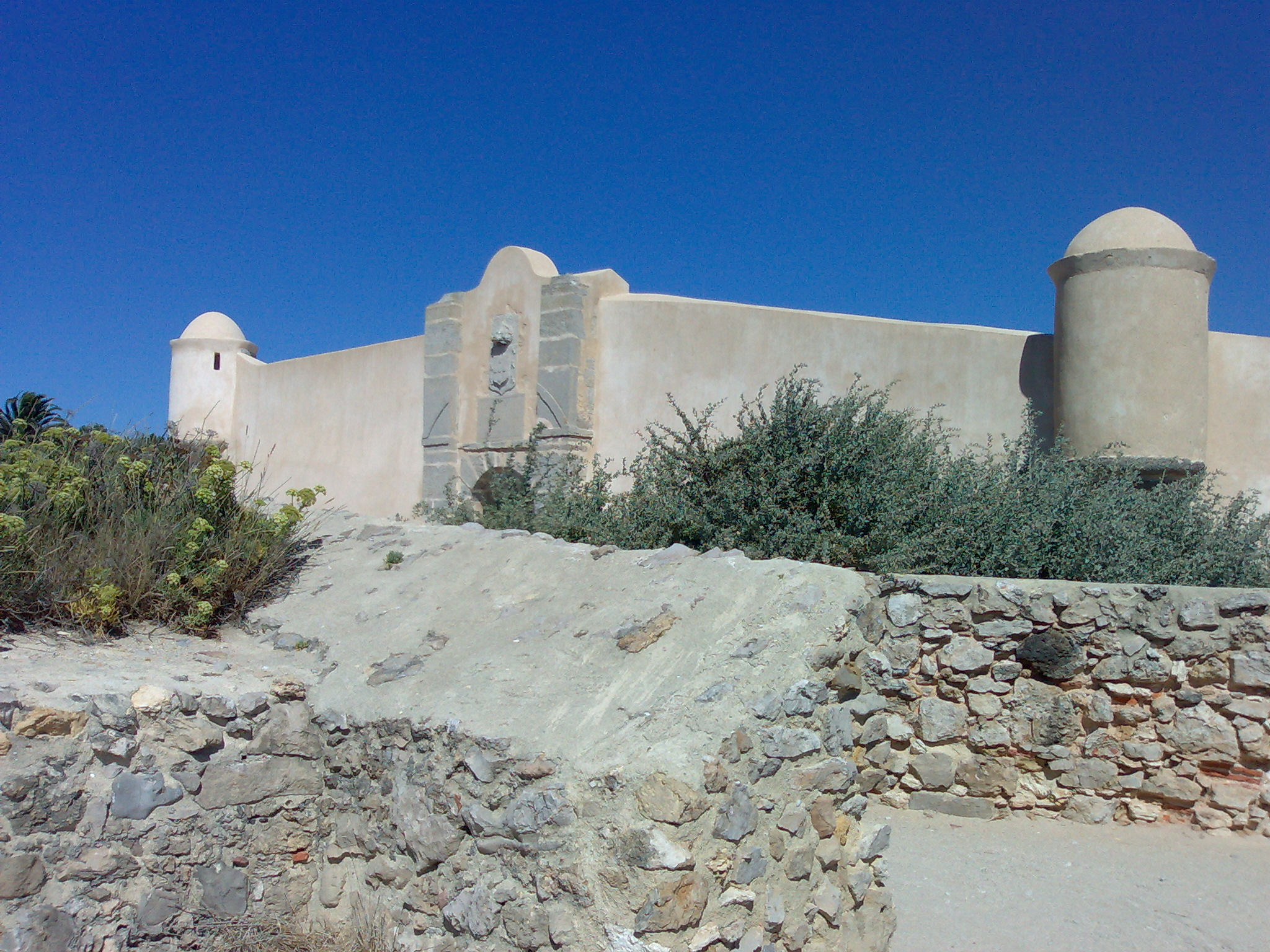

Site information
- Type: Fort
- Owner: Portuguese Republic
- Open to the public: Public

Location
- Coordinates: 38°41′5.00″N 9°28′06.00″W

Site history
- Built: c. 1641-43
- Materials: Masonry

The Fort of São Jorge (Portuguese: Forte de São Jorge de Oitavos) is located on the coastal highway EN 247, near the Oitavos dunes, in the parish and municipality of Cascais, Lisbon district, Portugal. It was one of a series of forts stretching from the Tower of Belem close to Lisbon to Cabo da Roca. It is now a museum.

== History ==
The fort was erected during the Portuguese Restoration War with Spain. It was designed as shelter for a small garrison of a corporal, three gunners and 18 soldiers, positioned to prevent landings on the coast between Guincho beach and Guia beach and thus complement the defence of the River Tagus. It permitted crossfire with the Fort of Nossa Senhora da Guia and the Fort of São Brás de Sanxete at Cabo Raso. The fort was constructed under the direction of António Luís de Meneses, 1st Marquis of Marialva.

It was equipped with four cannons, complemented by covered bartizans in the corners and by a covered line for the musketeers.

Although the inscription under the coat of arms on the gate specifies the dates of beginning and completion respectively as May 4, 1642 and 1648, scholars believe that a more correct period would have been from 1641 to 1643.

== The museum ==
The building has been classified as a cultural heritage building since 1974. After considerable work to restore the fort to its original layout, the museum opened for the first time on March 1, 2001. Restoration was based on a dated drawing of the fort from 1796. In September 2005, the fort and museum were closed for further work in order to address structural problems, to be re-opened on February 28, 2009. Of the three exhibition rooms, the first two are permanent exhibitions that cover various events that affected the lives of those who lived in the fort. The third room is used for temporary exhibitions, focusing on themes related to the history of the fort and its relationship to Cascais.

== Gallery ==
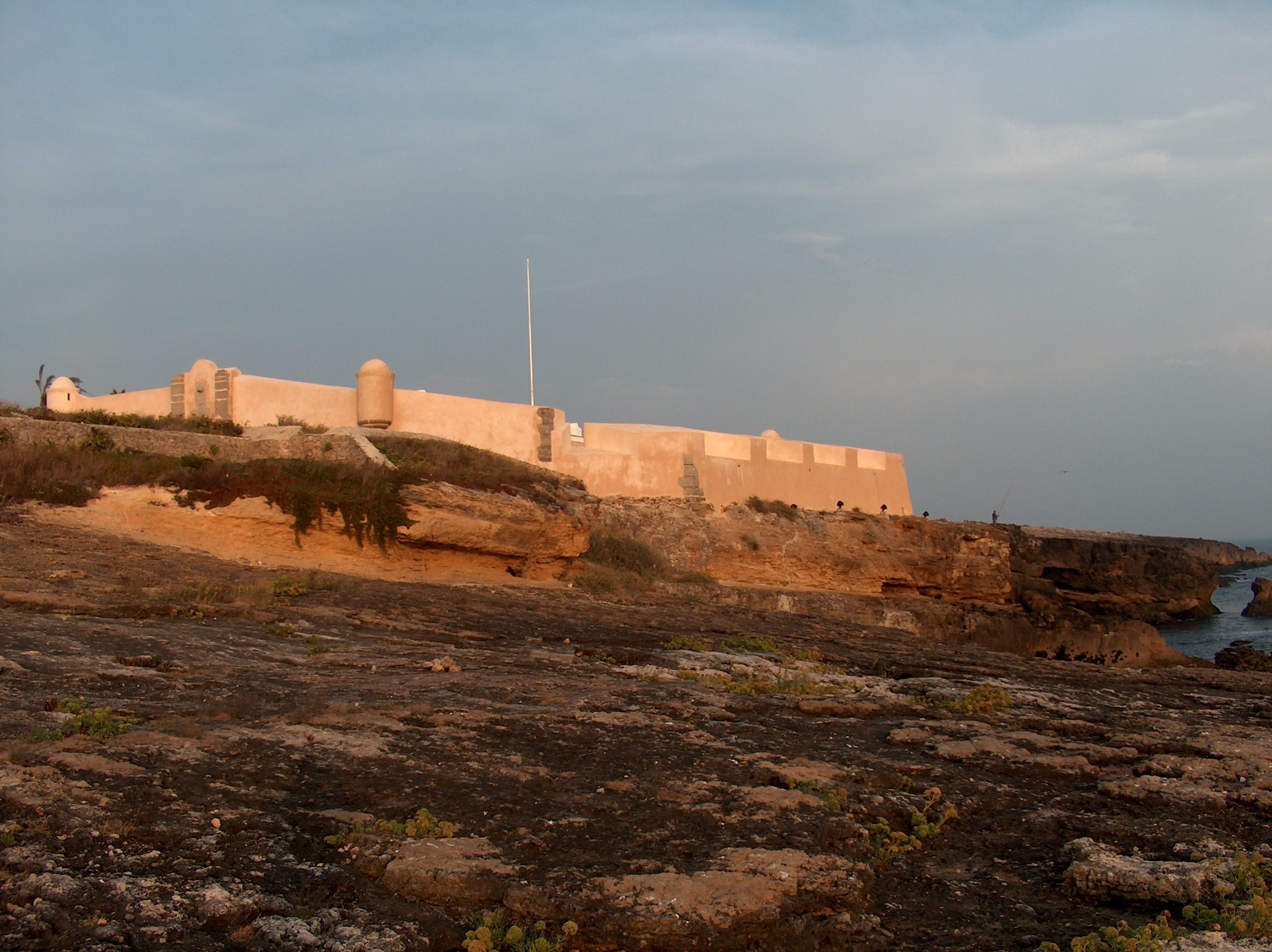

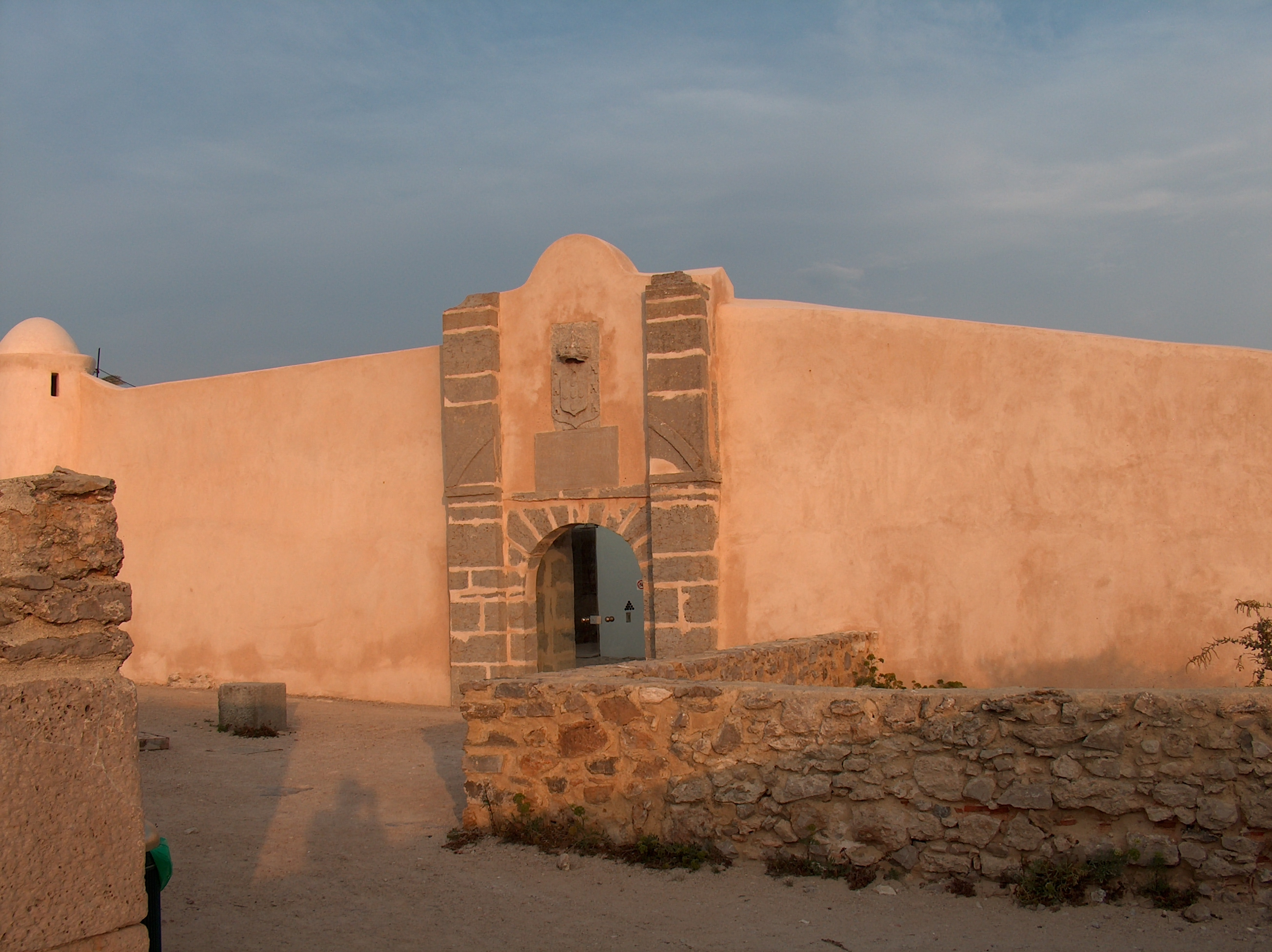

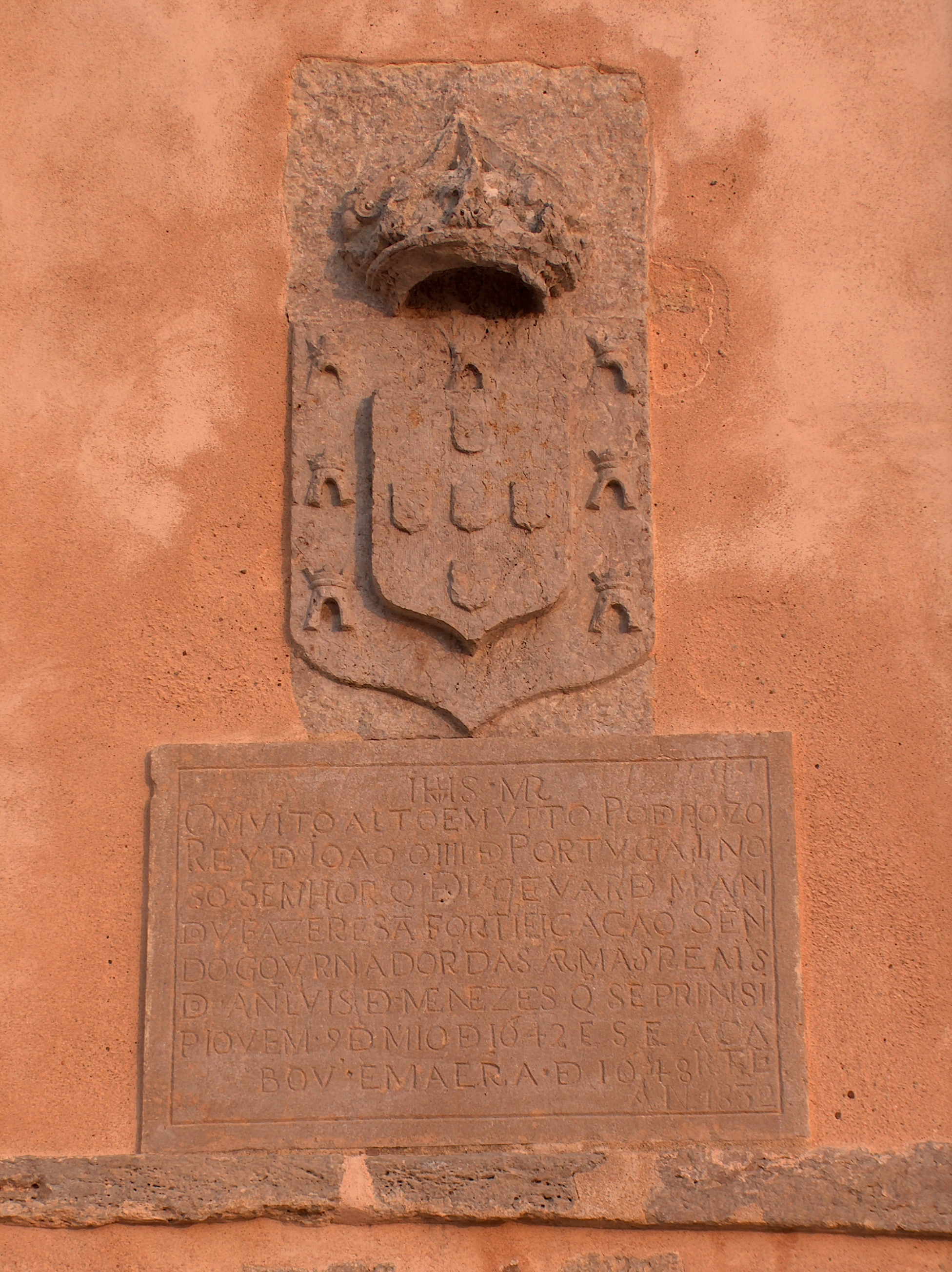

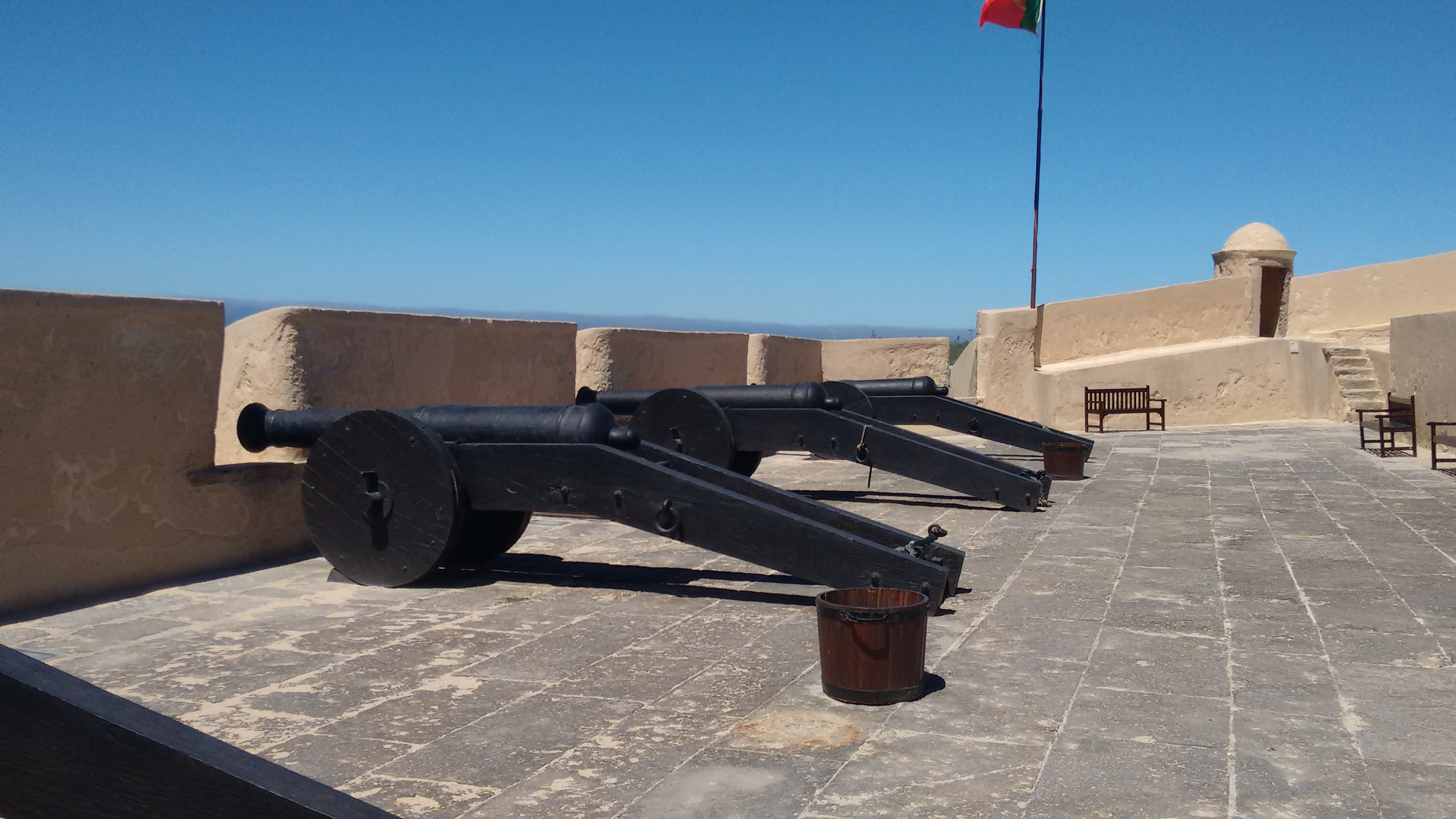

== See also ==
- List of forts
- Portuguese forts
