= Giant leptocephalus =

Scientific classification
- Kingdom: Animalia
- Phylum: Chordata
- Class: Actinopterygii
- Order: Anguilliformes
- Family: Colocongridae
- Genus: Coloconger
- Species: C. giganteus

Binomial name
- Coloconger giganteus (Castle, 1959)

Synonyms
- Ascomana giganteus (Castle, 1959); Leptocepgalus giganteus (Castle, 1959)

Species of fish

The giant leptocephalus (Coloconger giganteus) is a species of eel. It was first described by Peter Henry John Castle in 1959. It is a marine, deep-water dwelling eel which is distributed worldwide. It was thought that if it was indeed a leptocephalid, then it is probably the larvae of a Notacanthus species, most probably Notacanthus chemnitzii. However, in 2014, it was confirmed as a species of Coloconger.
