= Fort of Nossa Senhora da Guia (Cascais) =

Building in Cascais, Lisbon District, Portugal

- Forte de Nossa Senhora da Guia
- Lisbon; Near Cascais in Portugal
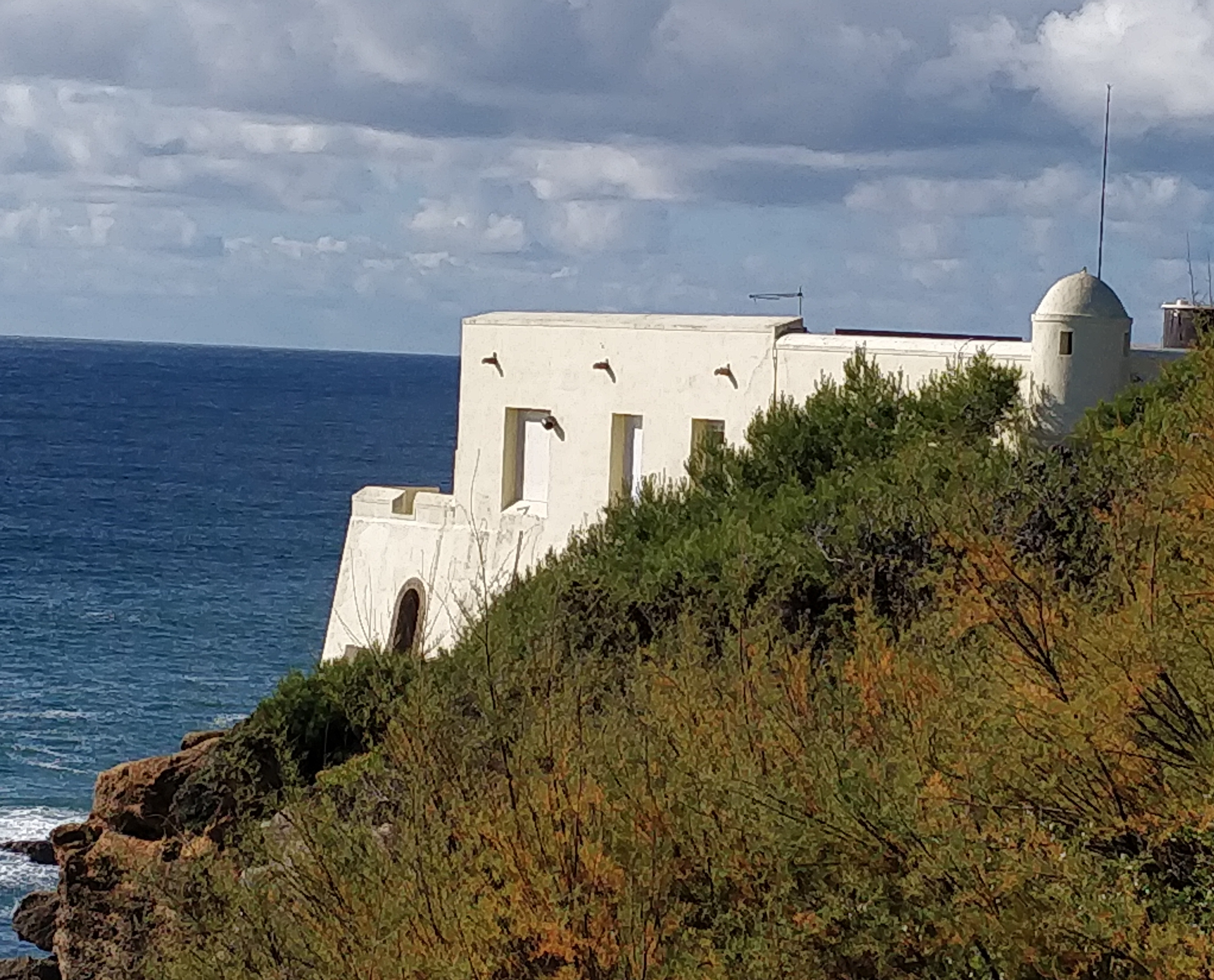

Site information
- Type: Fort
- Owner: Government
- Operator: University of Lisbon
- Open to the public: No

Location
- Coordinates: 38°41′43″N 9°27′9″W

Site history
- Built: 1646
- Materials: Masonry

The Fort of Nossa Senhora da Guia is located in Cascais, Lisbon District in Portugal. It was built during the Portuguese Restoration War (1640-1668), becoming operational in 1646. The site, which preserves some parts of the fort, is now occupied by a maritime laboratory under control of the Faculty of Sciences of the University of Lisbon.

== History ==
Located at the landing place on July 28, 1580 of Spanish troops under the command of Fernando Álvarez de Toledo, 3rd Duke of Alba, the fort of Nossa Senhora da Guia was one of the series aimed at defending Lisbon that stretched from the Tower of Belem close to Lisbon to Cabo da Roca on the Atlantic coast. It was built between 1640 and 1646 in the reign of John IV of Portugal, under the supervision of António Luís de Meneses, 1st Marquis of Marialva (1640-1656). In 1646 it was armed with artillery and the garrison consisted of a corporal, three gunners and twelve soldiers.

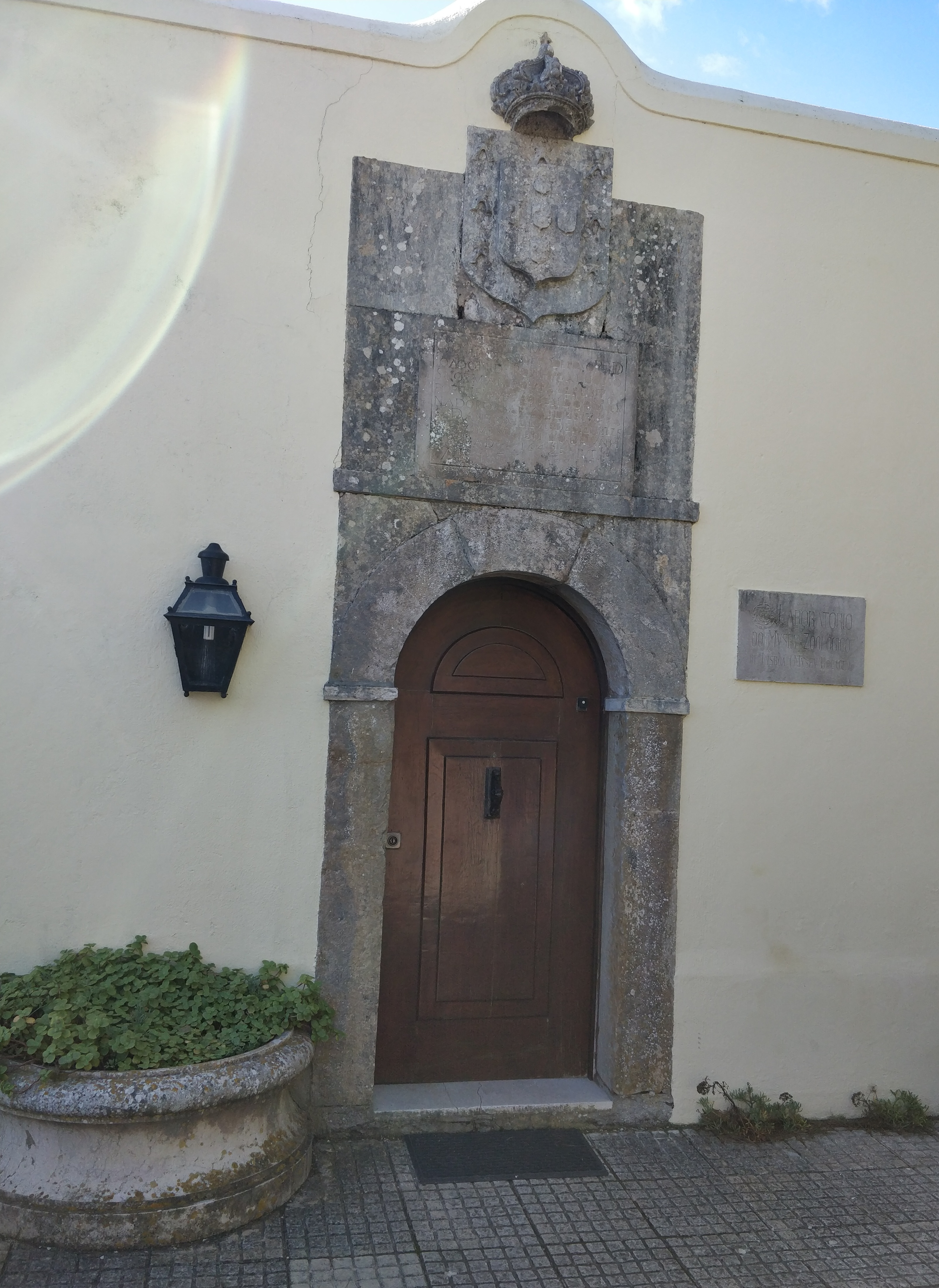
The gate of the fort with coat of arms

The fort followed the same rectangular plan used for most of the other forts built along the Cascais coast in the same period. It was able to crossfire with the Fort of São Jorge at Oitavos to the WNW. Its space was divided into two distinct areas, the battery and the accommodation area. By the mid-1700s the structure was already beginning to show signs of degradation, and the 1755 Lisbon earthquake caused further damage. Some restoration was carried out in the 1760s but the main repairs were carried out between 1793 and 1796. At this time the fort was modernized, merlons were built and six openings in the walls were made so that cannons could be used. Work also included remodeling of the internal organization of the fort. Four bartizans were also added, one each in the northwestern and northeastern corners, and another two facing the sea. In 1796 the garrison consisted of just one corporal and two soldiers. By September 1805 it was garrisoned mainly by military invalids and from the end of 1813 it was garrisoned mostly by veterans.

Further improvements were carried out in 1829 in the context of the Portuguese Civil War (1828-1834). Additional restoration work was necessary in 1831 and 1832, when the artillery pieces were also restored. In 1832 the garrison consisted of one officer, one corporal, 4 infantrymen and 8 gunners. However the fort was abandoned in 1833 when the army of Miguel I withdrew.

== See also ==
- List of forts
