= Fort Santa Maria da Arrábida =

- Forte de Santa Maria da Arrábida
- Portinho da Arrábida, Portugal
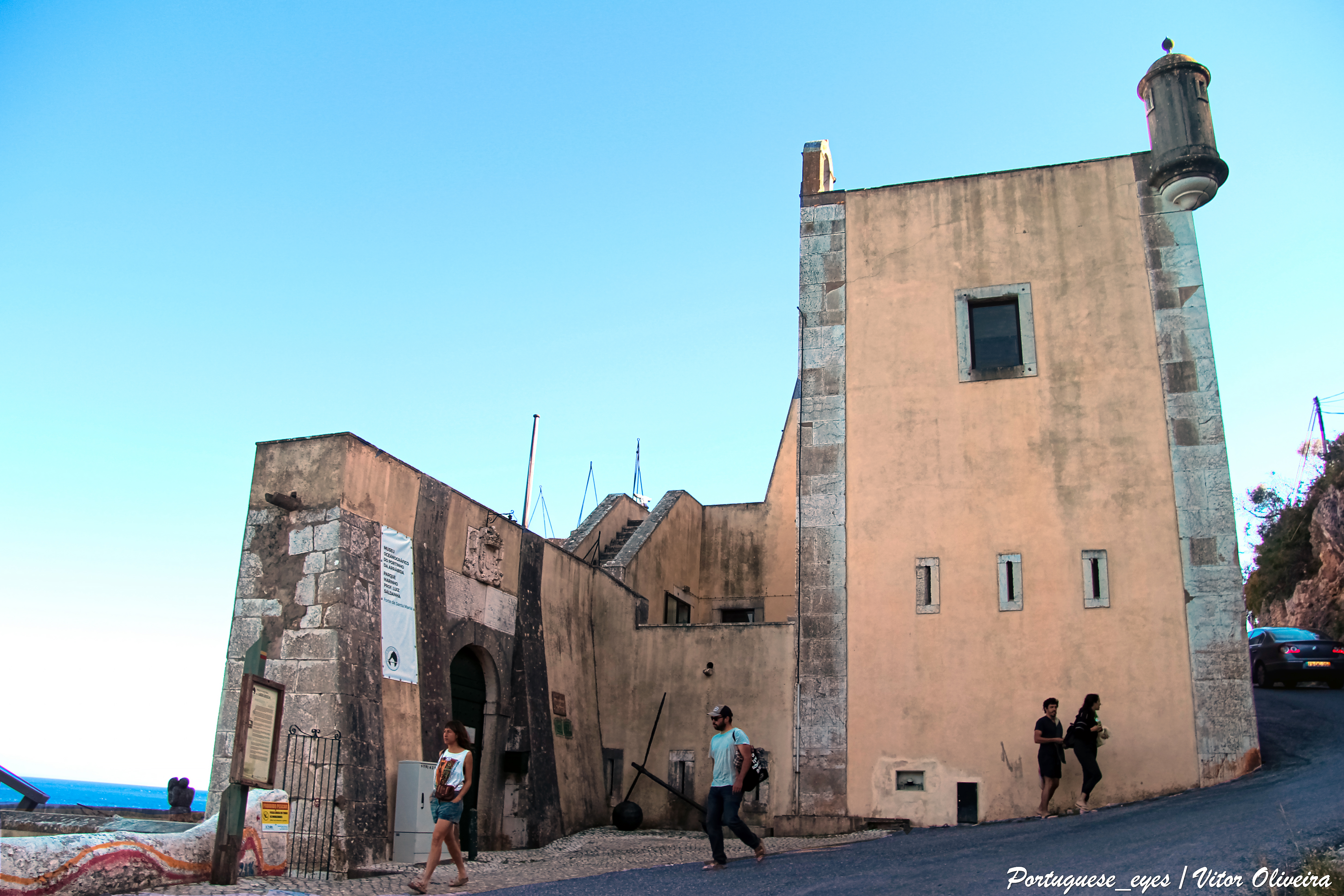
- Front and gateway of the fort

Site information
- Type: Bastion fort
- Condition: Good

Location
- Coordinates: 38°28′0″N 8°58′0″W

Site history
- Built: 1749–1751
- Events: Portuguese War of Restoration

The Fort Santa Maria da Arrábida (Forte de Santa Maria da Arrábida in Portuguese) also referred to as Fort Nossa Senhora da Arrábida (Forte de Nossa Senhora da Arrábida in Portuguese), Fort of Arrábida (Forte da Arrábida in Portuguese) and Fort of Portinho da Arrábida, is located at the foot of the southern slope of the mountain range of the same name, in a dominant position to southwest of Portinho da Arrábida, on the northern bank of the Sado River, in the Municipality and District of Setúbal, in Portugal.

It complements the set of 18th century fortifications built during the Portuguese Restoration War, along the coast from Setúbal to the Fort São Domingos da Baralha, near Cape Espichel. It currently contains the Luís de Saldanha Oceanographic Museum.

== History ==
The site took on religious dimensions from 1250 onwards, when, according to tradition, Hildebrand, a merchant from the British Isles, built a small hermitage devoted to Our Lady, as a symbol of thanks for the miracle that saved him from a shipwreck there.

Between 1539 and 1542, Dom João de Lencastre (1501–1571), 1st Duke of Aveiro, built the original convent, donated to the Spanish Franciscan Friar Martin de Santa Maria Benavides, who wanted to live there as a hermit. Construction work continued between the second half of the 16th century and the first half of the 17th century, due to the devotion of the 2nd and 3rd Dukes of Aveiro, (to whom the construction of the inn and stations of Passos da Paixão are owed) and the daughter-in-law of the 3rd Duke. In the mid-17th century, the 4th Duke of Aveiro promoted the construction of the Bom Jesus chapel.

Constructed as part of the complete renovation of Portugal's defenses during the reign of John IV (1640–1656), as far as the defense of the Setúbal river mouth was concerned, the oldest version of this coastal fortification was only begun between 1670 and 1676, under the reign of King Peter II (1667–1706), with the function of defending the so-called "little port" and the Monastery of Arrábida, a site of pilgrimage. The current fort dates to the rule of John V (1706–1750) during which reconstruction was undertaken. A stone over the gate-of-arms reads:

Governing these kingdoms and lordships of Portugal the very high and powerful Prince Dom Pedro, Our Lord, by the Marquis of Fronteira, of the Council of War, gentleman of his Chamber, overseer of his finances, General-Field-Master of the Court, Estremadura, Cascaes and Setúbal, had this fortress built to defend this port and rivermouth of Arrábida and its seas in the year 1676. By order of H. M. everything was remade to the foundations, the roads remade, and was finished on MDCCXLIX.

Another source however references the fort as "nearly finished" in 1751.

The fort was restored in 1798. It was occupied by forces loyal to King Miguel during the Portuguese Civil War. it was kept in operation until the reign of King Luís (1861–1889), when, faced with the loss of its defensive function due to the evolution of war means and the abandonment of the monasteries, it was deactivated in 1853.

In the 19th century, with the extinction of religious orders in Portugal, the monastery was abandoned by the Franciscan friars (1834), being acquired by the Dukes of Palmela (1863).

Between 1903 and 1938 it was rented to several individuals for private use, ranging from a hunting lodge to restaurant and inn. From 1932 onwards, it was adapted to the functions of a restaurant and inn by Sebastião Leal da Gama (father of the poet Sebastião da Gama), which remained open until 1976. As of 1978, the property became part of the Arrábida Natural Park, becoming a Property of Public Interest. Since then, extensive consolidation and restoration works have been carried out, adapting the monument to the function of an Oceanographic Museum (1991), which maintains a marine biology center on the site. A small shop sells items related to the park's protected area and offers coffee to visitors. At the end of the 20th century, they were acquired by Fundação Oriente (1990), which reclassified them as a cultural space.

== Features ==
A small coastal fort, it features an organic polygon plan, with a hexagon earthwork and four battlements on the sea side. The service facilities are currently being reclassified as exhibition, aquarium and video rooms.

In its chapel, you can see an expressive image of Our Lady, in lioz stone, with a 17th century features.

== Gallery ==
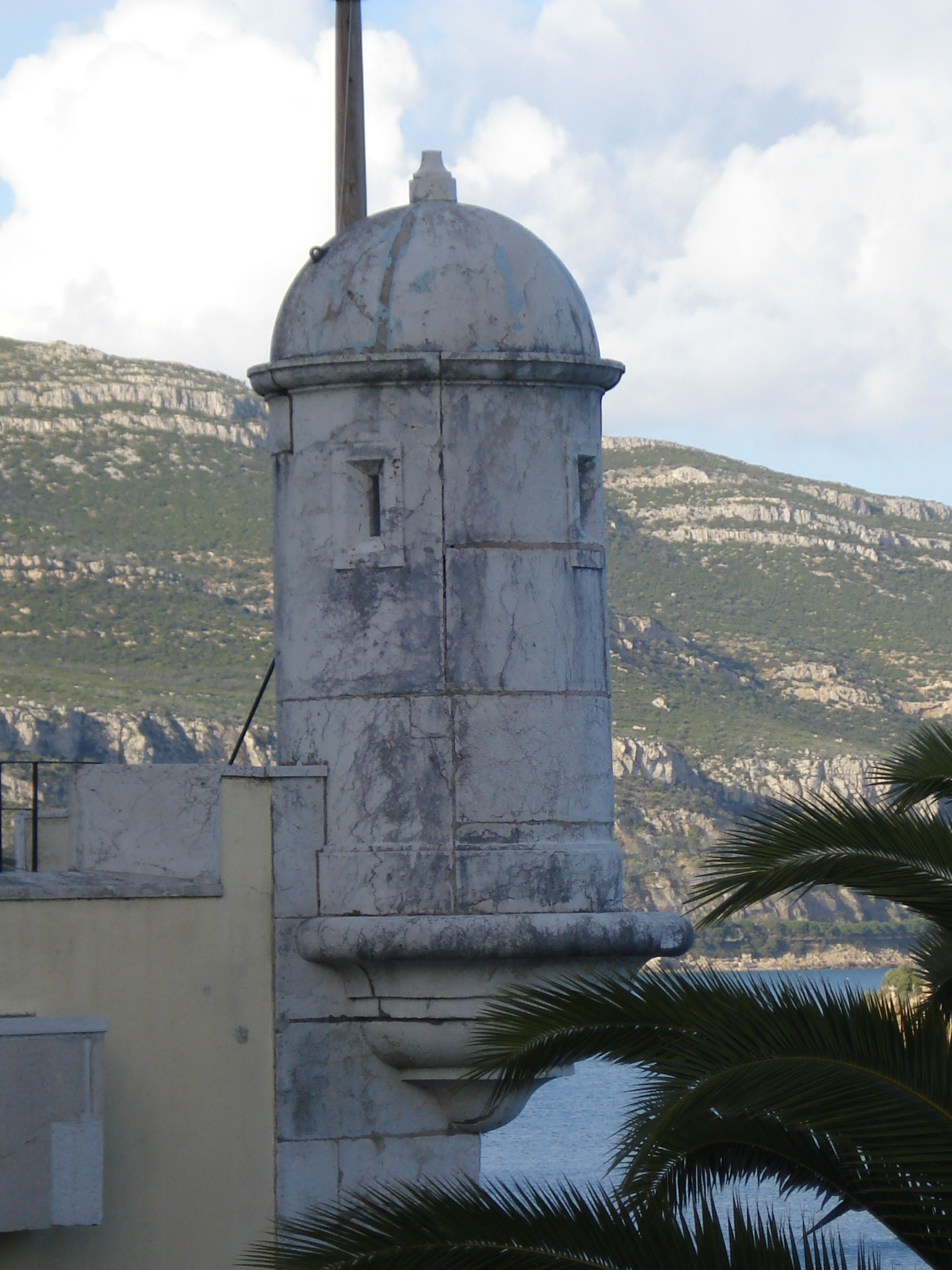
Sentry box.

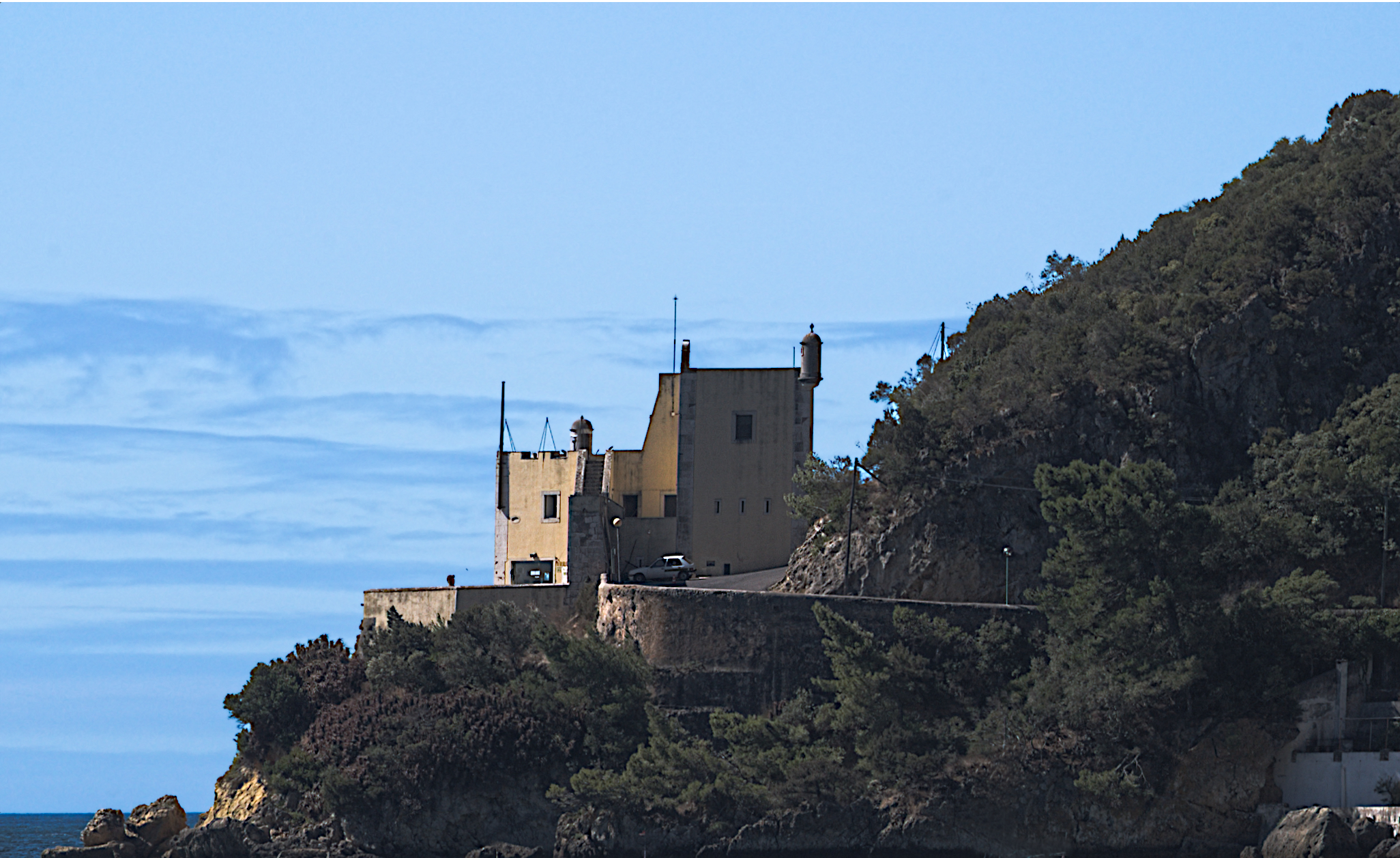
Far-away view.

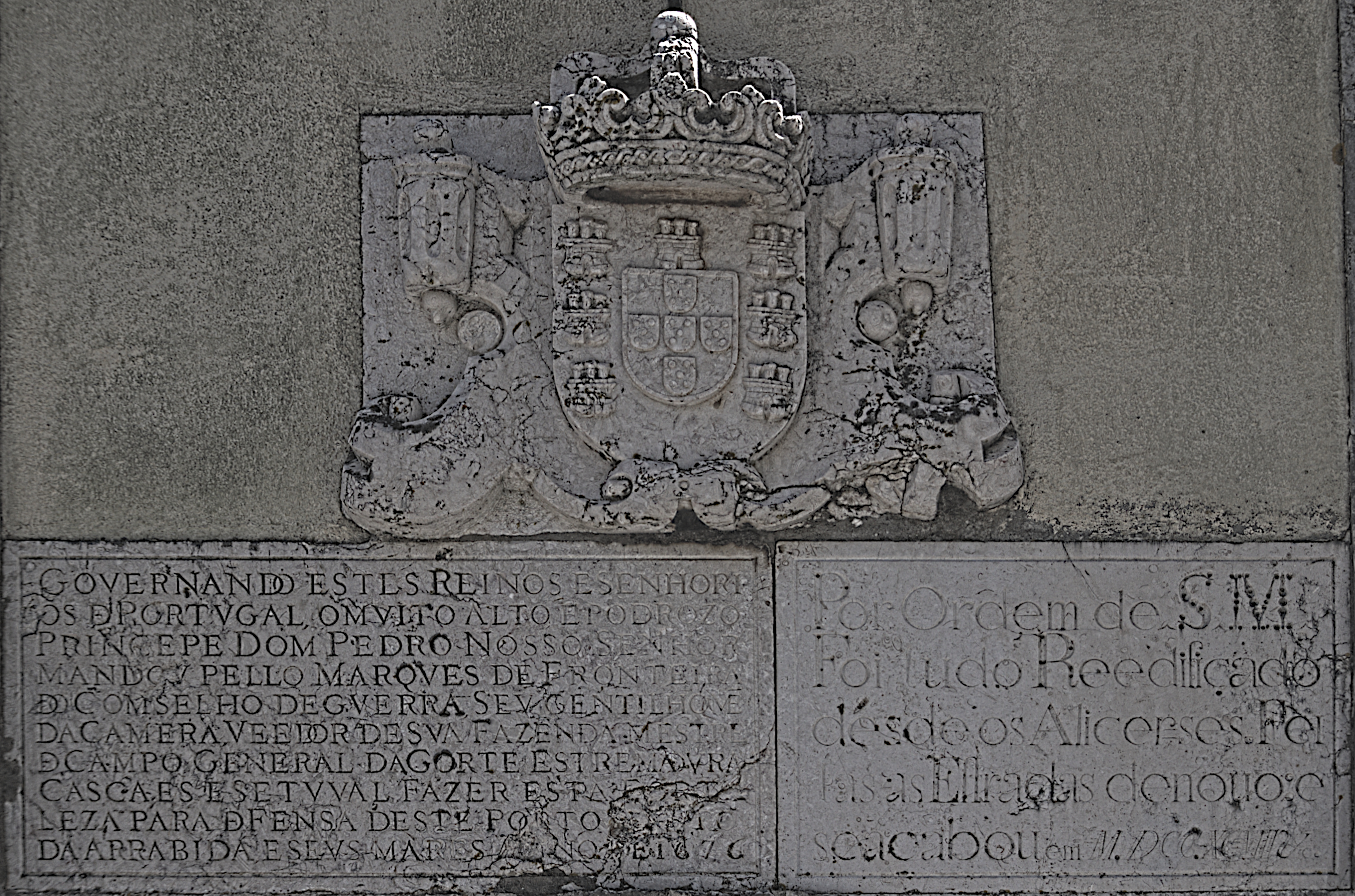
Stone-of-arms bearing an inscription.

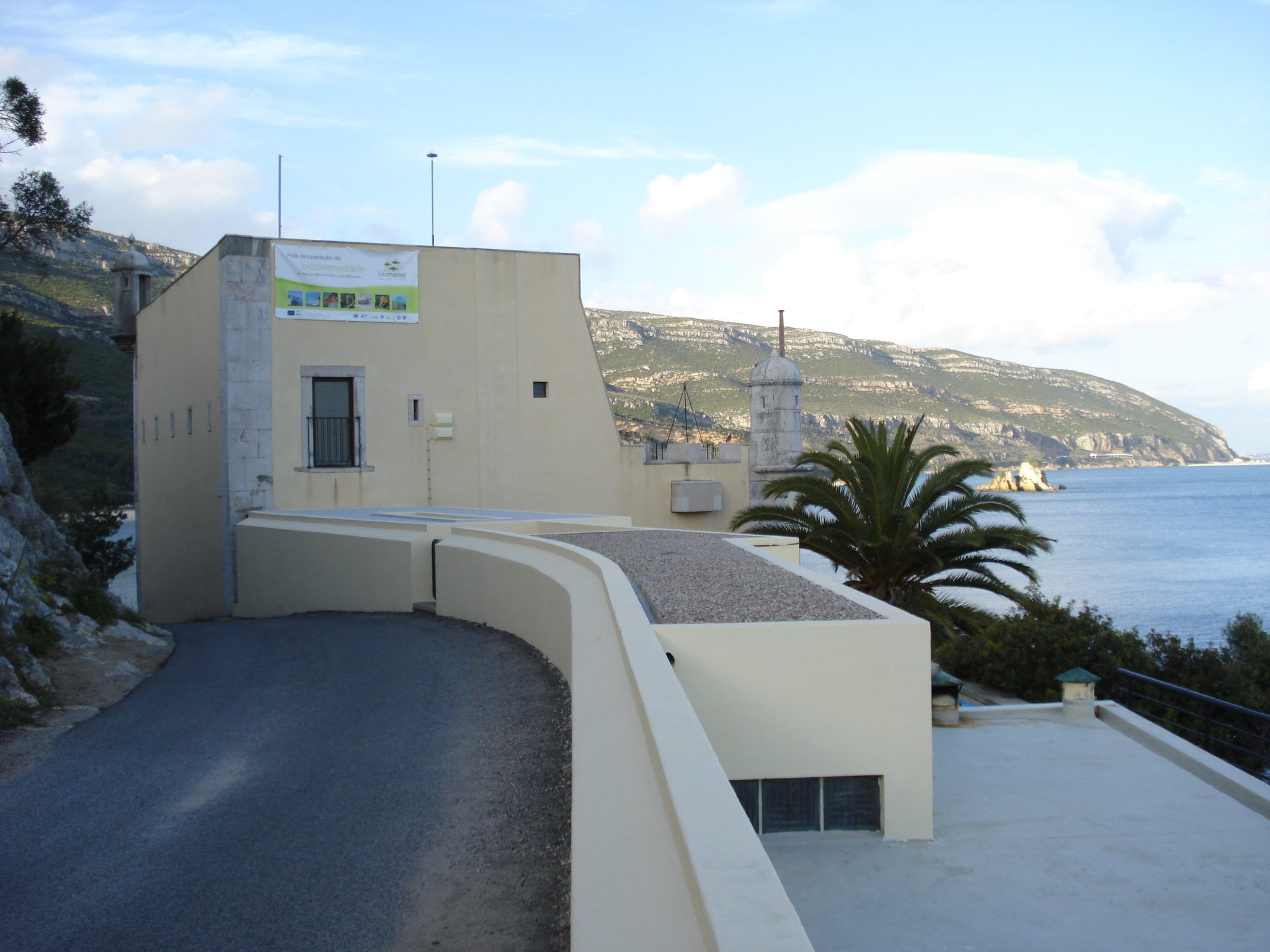
Western view.

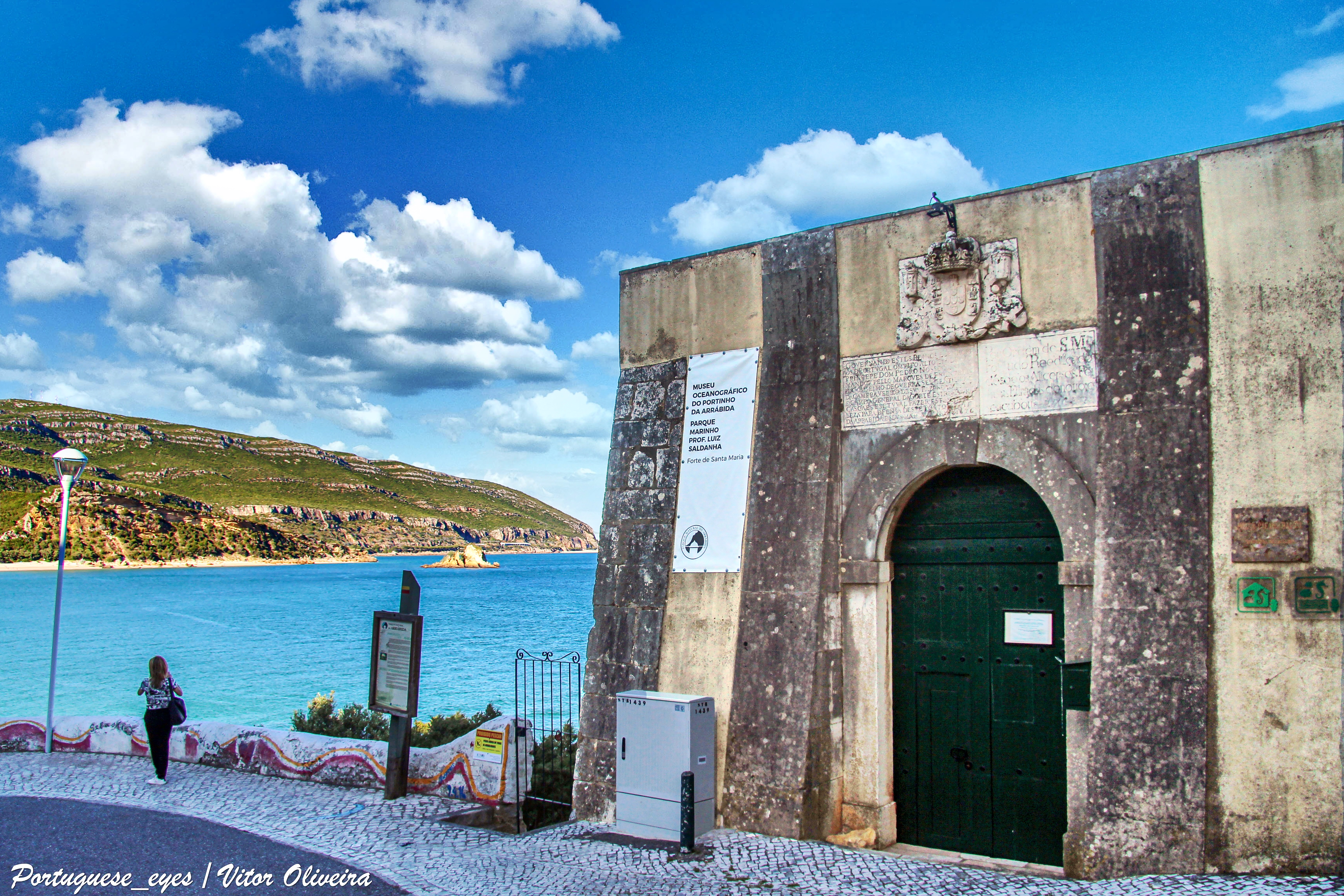
Gate-of-arms.
