= Lisbon Oceanarium =

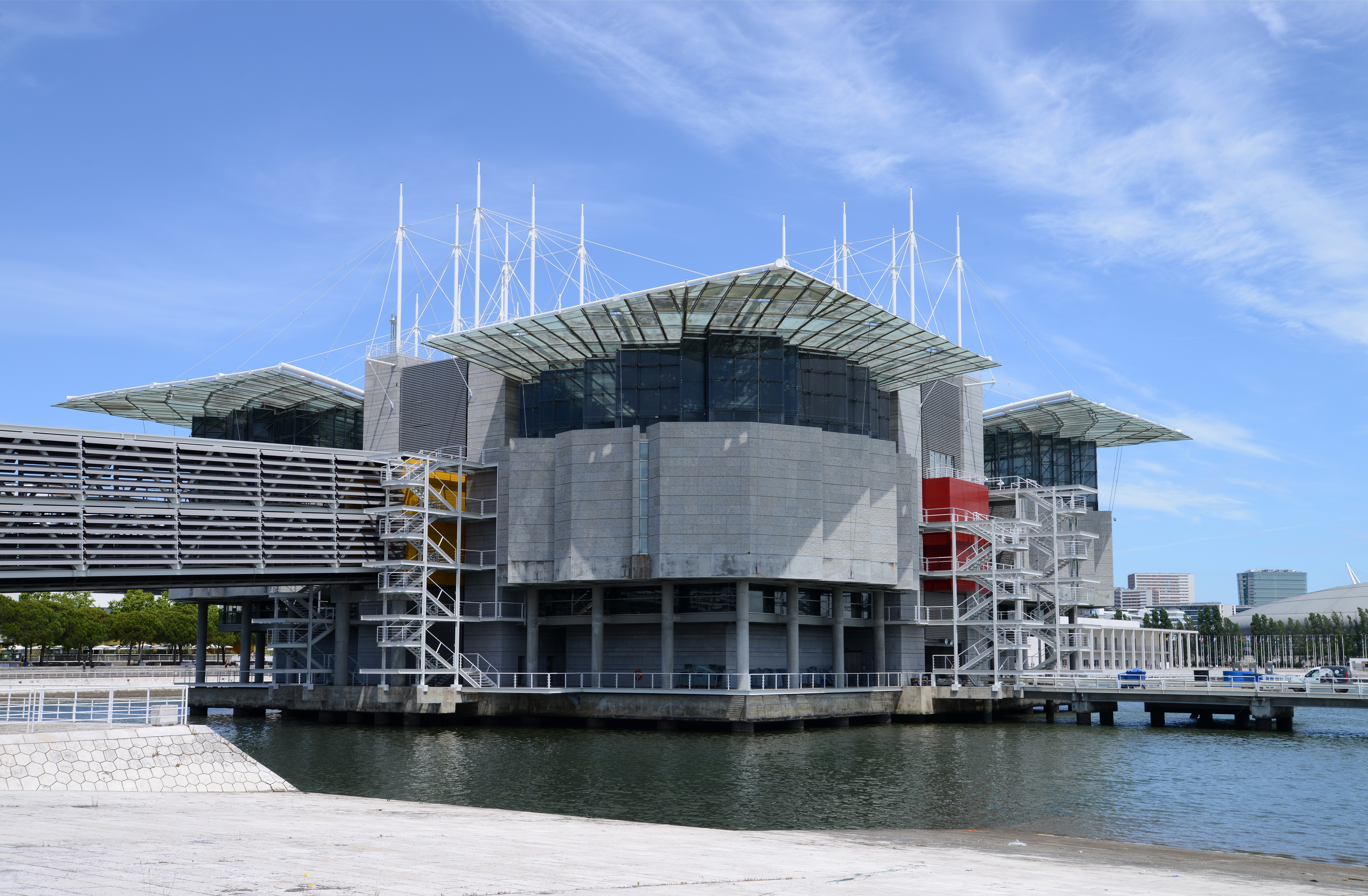
- The Oceanarium in the Parque das Nações
- Interactive map of Lisbon Oceanarium
- 38.7635°N 9.0937°W
- Date opened: 1998
- Location: Lisbon, Portugal
- No. of animals: 16,000
- No. of species: 450
- Volume of largest tank: 5,000 m^{3} (180,000 ft^{3})
- Annual visitors: 1,000,000
- Public transit: Vermelha at Oriente
- Website: www.oceanario.pt

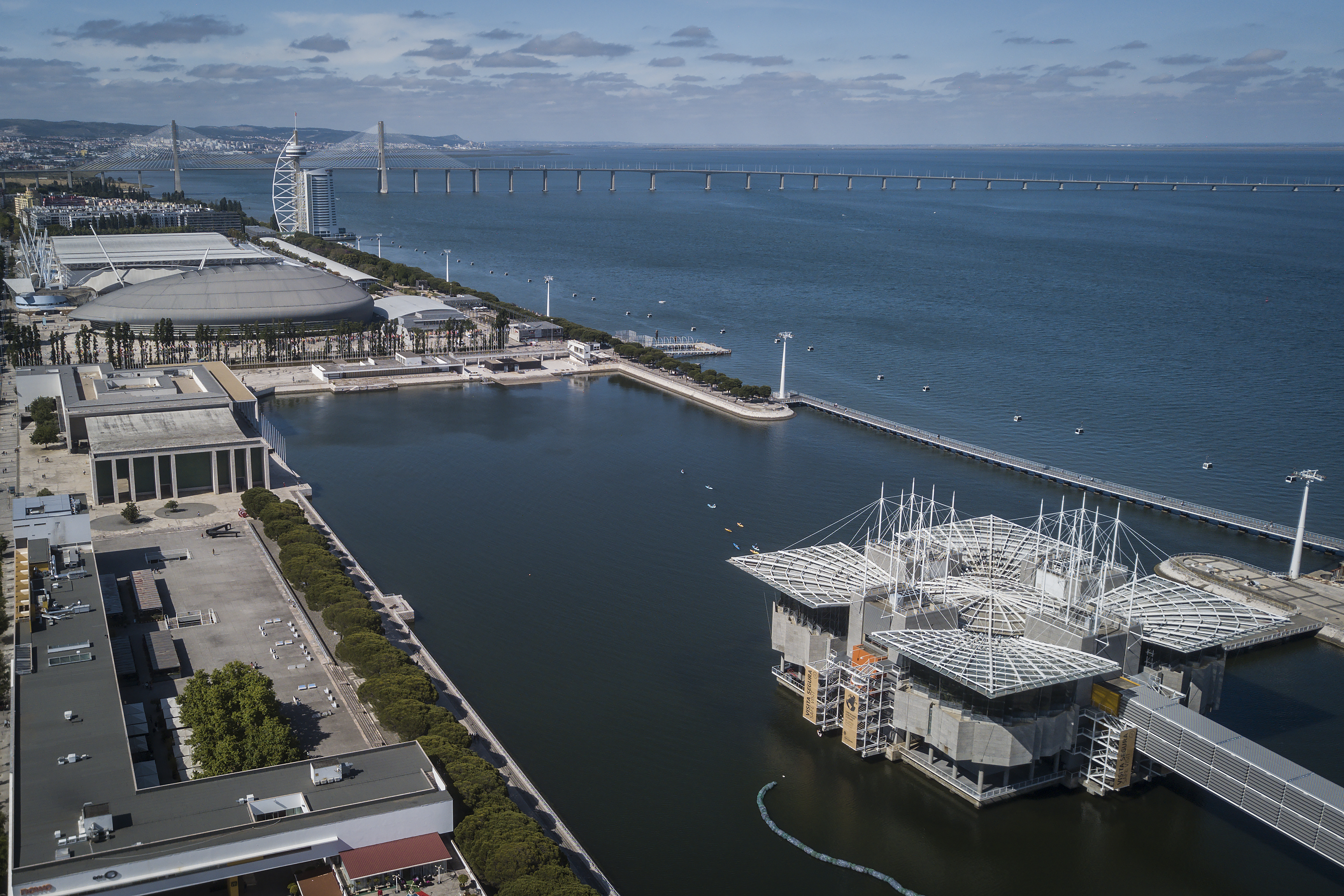
Aerial view of the Oceanarium

The Lisbon Oceanarium (Portuguese: Oceanário de Lisboa, pronounced [ɔsi.ɐˈnaɾi.u ðɨ liʒˈβoɐ]) is an oceanarium in Lisbon, Portugal. It is located in the Parque das Nações, which was the exhibition grounds for the Expo '98. It is one of the largest indoor aquariums in Europe and approximately 1 million people visit each year.

== Architecture ==
The Lisbon Oceanarium’s conceptual design, architecture, and exhibit design was led by Peter Chermayeff of Peter Chermayeff LLC while at Cambridge Seven Associates. It is said to resemble an aircraft carrier, and is built on a pier in an artificial lagoon. Chermayeff is also the designer of the Osaka Oceanarium Kaiyukan, one of the world's largest aquariums, and many other aquariums around the world.

== Exhibits ==
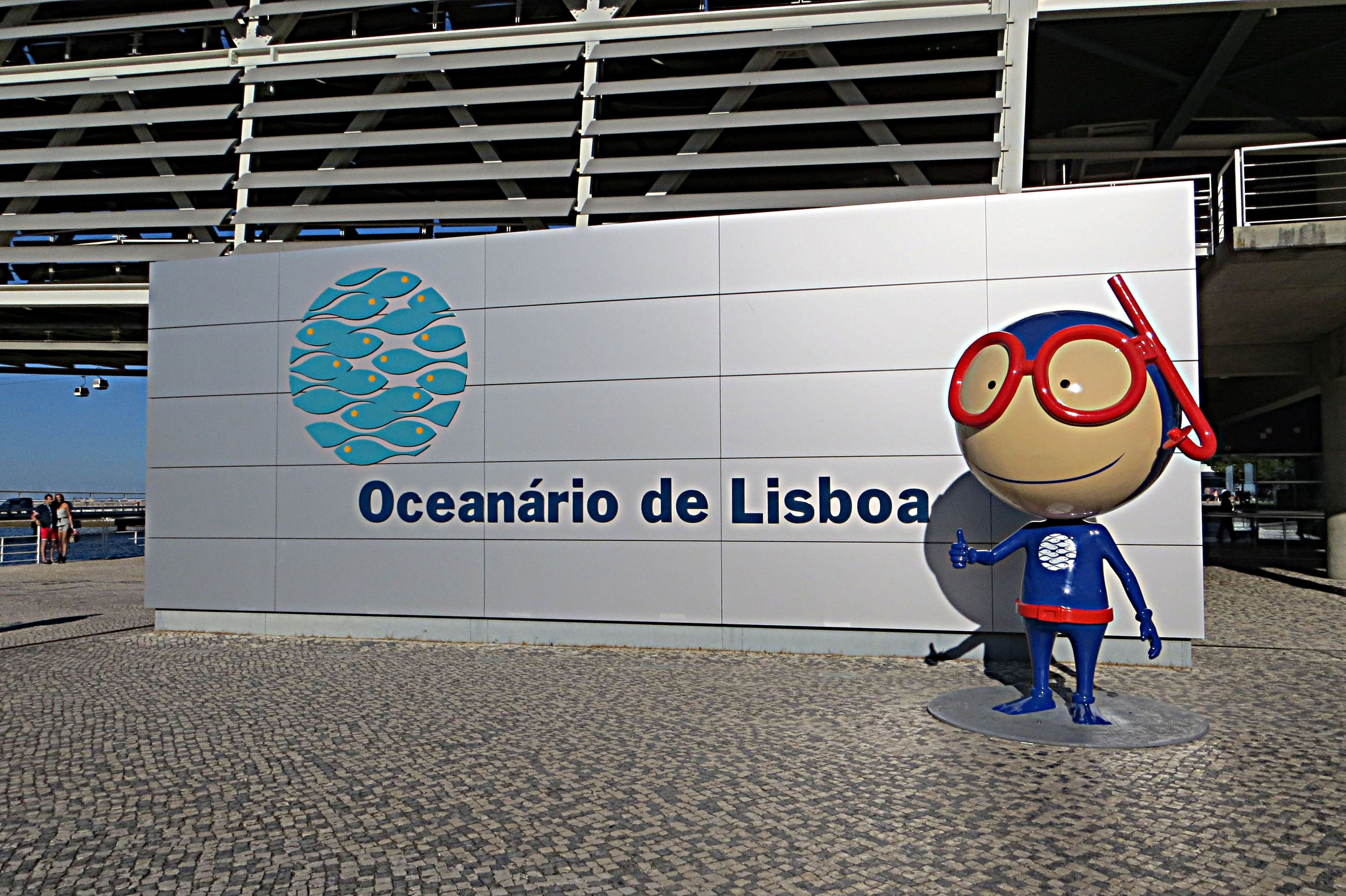
Entrance view

The Lisbon Oceanarium has a large collection of marine species — penguins, seagulls and other birds; sea otters (mammals); sharks, rays, chimaeras, seahorses and other bony fish; crustaceans; starfish, sea urchins and other echinoderms; sea anemones, corals and other cnidaria; octopuses, cuttlefish, sea snails and other mollusks; amphibians; jellyfish; marine plants and terrestrial plants and other marine organisms totaling about 16,000 individuals of 450 species.

The main exhibit is a 1,000 m^{2} (11,000 ft^{2}), 5,000,000 L (1,300,000 US gal) tank with four large 49 m^{2} (530 ft^{2}) acrylic windows on its sides, and smaller focus windows strategically located around it to make sure it is a constant component throughout the exhibit space. It is 7 m (23 ft) deep, which allows pelagic swimmers to swim above the bottom dwellers, and provides the illusion of the open ocean. About 100 species from around the world are kept in this tank, including sharks, rays, barracudas, groupers, and moray eels. One of the main attractions is a large sunfish.

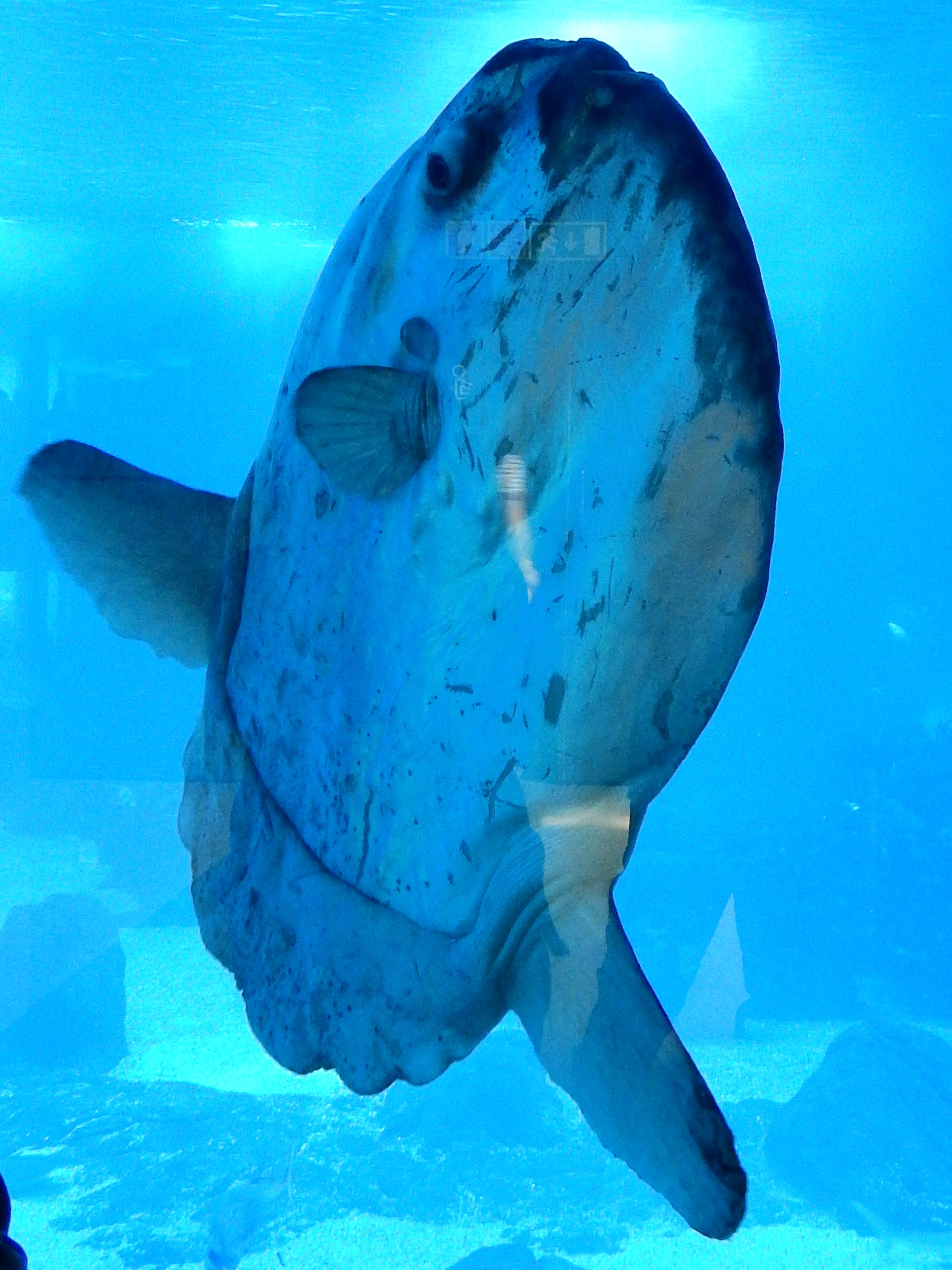
Ocean sunfish

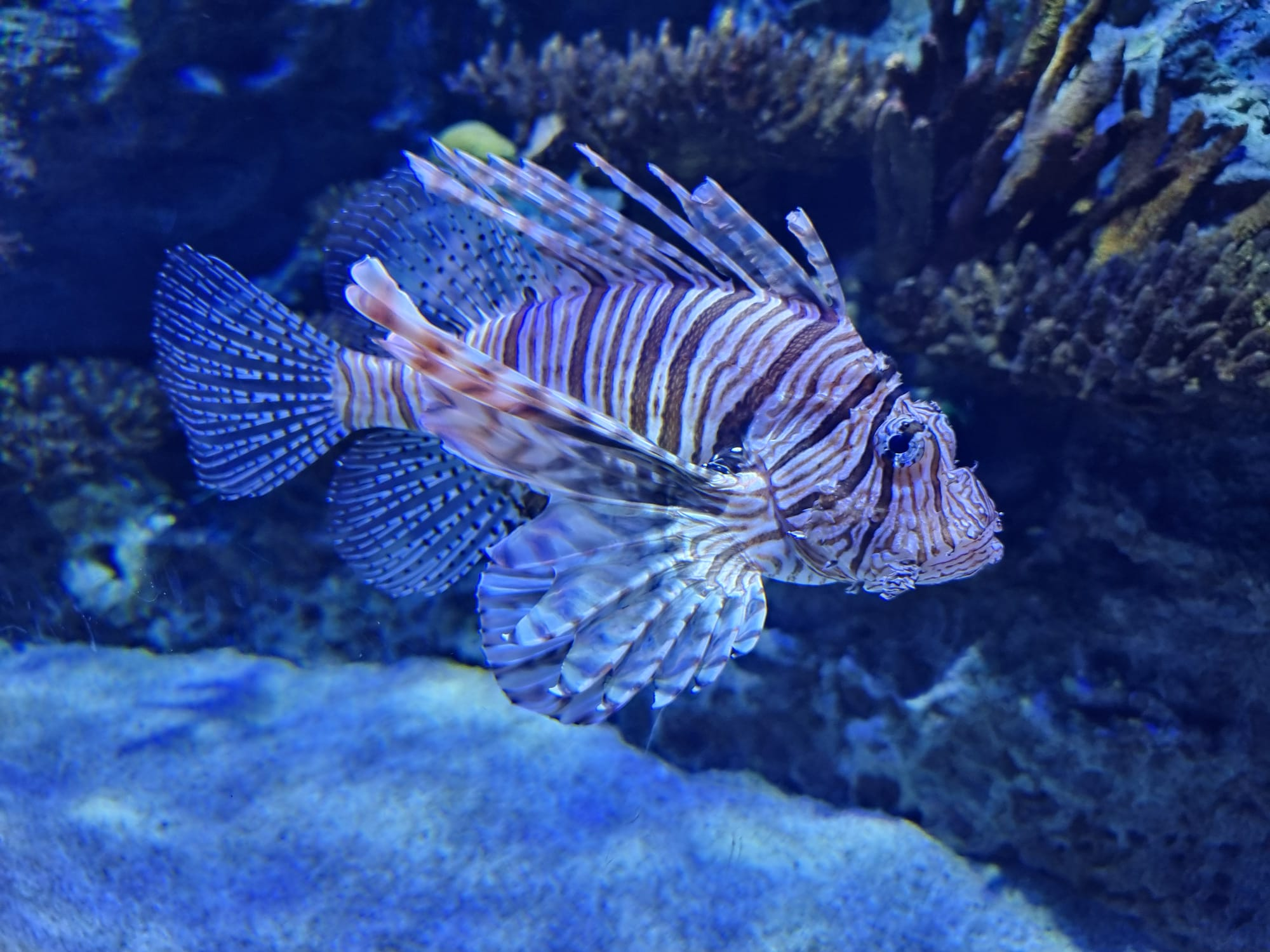
Lionfish at Lisbon Oceanarium

Four tanks around the large central tank house four different habitats with their native flora and fauna: the North Atlantic rocky coast, the Antarctic coastal line, the Temperate Pacific kelp forests, and the Tropical Indian coral reefs. These tanks are separated from the central tank only by large sheets of acrylic to provide the illusion of a single large tank. Throughout the first floor there are an additional 25 thematic aquariums with each of the habitats' own characteristics.

The Lisbon Oceanarium is one of the few aquariums in the world to house a sunfish, because of their unique and demanding requirements for care. Other species include two large spider crabs and two sea otters named Eusébio after the soccer player and Amália, named after the fado singer Amália Rodrigues. After both otters died (Eusébio in 2010 and Amália in 2013), two new otters (named Micas and Maré), their daughters, which had been loaned to the Rotterdam zoo were brought back.

=== Forests Underwater by Takashi Amano ===
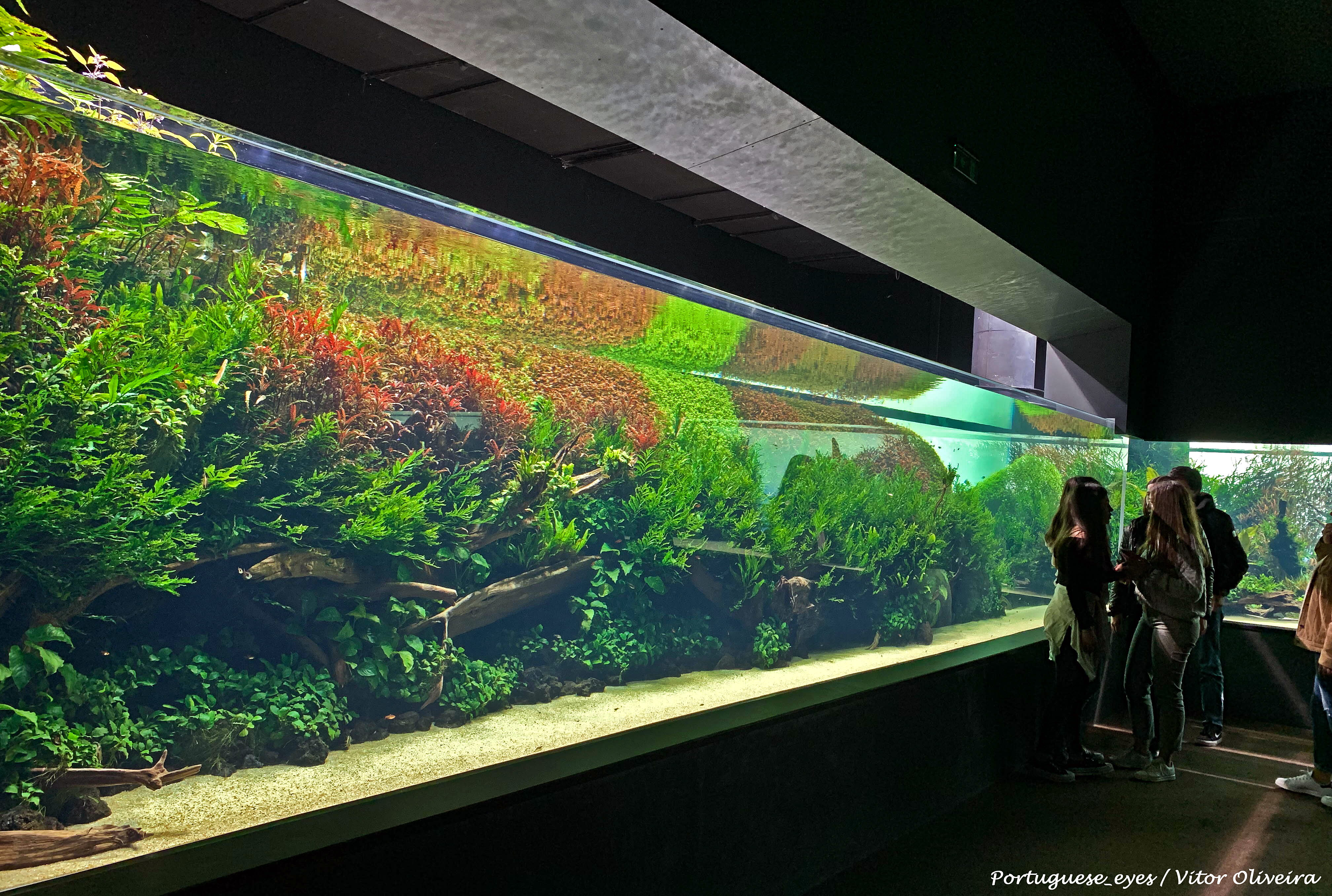
Forests Underwater by Takashi Amano at the Lisbon Oceanarium

In 2015, a temporary exhibition, “Forests Underwater" by Takashi Amano opened. It is a tropical freshwater aquarium featuring a large amount of plants and is the world's largest nature aquarium at 40 metres long and 160,000 litres. Originally scheduled to be open 2 years, it closed in September 30, 2026 after a ten year run, with over 7milion visits.

== See also ==
- Vasco da Gama Aquarium, Lisbon's first aquarium.
