= Vasco da Gama Aquarium =

Aquarium in Lisbon, Portugal

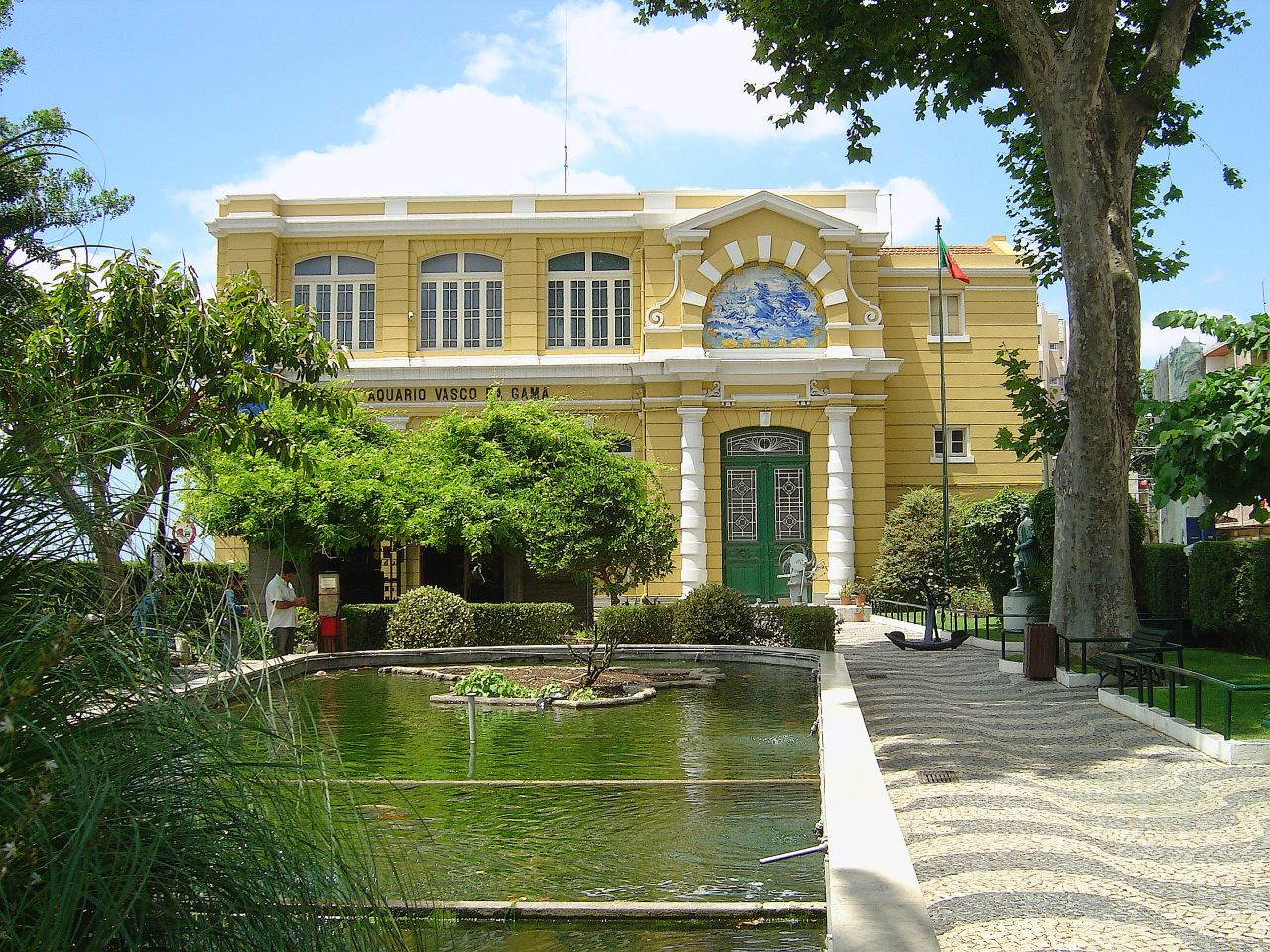
- Interactive map of Vasco da Gama Aquarium
- 38.699°N 9.238°W
- Date opened: 1898
- Location: Oeiras, Lisbon, Portugal
- No. of species: 300
- Annual visitors: 70,000
- Website: cultura.marinha.pt/pt/aquariovgama

The Vasco da Gama Aquarium (Portuguese: Aquário Vasco da Gama) is one of the oldest aquariums in the world. It is located in Dafundo, in the civil parish of Algés, Linda-a-Velha e Cruz Quebrada-Dafundo, in the municipality of Oeiras near the Portuguese capital of Lisbon. It is a public aquarium and is run by the Portuguese Navy's Cultural Commission.

== History ==
The Vasco da Gama Aquarium project was conceived in the context of the celebrations of the 4th centenary of Vasco da Gama's departure from Portugal on the voyage on which he discovered the sea route to India. The idea of the aquarium received the full support of King Carlos I, a pioneer of oceanography in the country. The land on which it was built was donated by the Ministry of Public Works, and the construction work was under the responsibility of the executive committee of the "Fourth Centenary of the Discovery of the Sea Route to India" celebrations and was supervised by marine zoologist, Albert Girard, who worked closely with the king.

The aquarium was inaugurated on 20 May 1898, in the presence of the king. Included in the display were the marine collections amassed during the oceanographic campaigns the monarch had undertaken aboard the royal yacht Amélia. With the end of the 400th anniversary celebrations, the aquarium passed into the hands of the Portuguese State, which handed over its administration and operation to the Portuguese Geographical Society. Due to a lack of resources, the aquarium remained virtually without technical supervision until 1901, and fell into disrepair. The government then handed it over to the Ministry of the Navy, which continues to provide a budget for the maintenance of the aquarium, which is supplemented by ticket revenue. In 1901 the Navy appointed as director a renowned journalist, Armando Silva, who had a deep interest in the natural sciences. Despite the efforts made to restore the aquarium, Armando Silva's relationship with the government deteriorated, leading to another journalist, Francisco Machado Vieira, taking over the position. In 1908, the Portuguese Society of Natural Sciences established itself in the aquarium, under the direction of Almeida Lima. In 1935, collection was enriched by the transfer of the D. Carlos I Oceanographic Museum collection to the aquarium.

== Exhibits ==
The aquarium's main objective was to showcase the extensive oceanographic collection amassed by King Carlos I over a 12-year period, beginning on 1 September 1896. In 1917, a second floor was constructed, known as the Salão Nobre (Noble Hall), which houses the king's collection to this day. Since 2021, the aquarium has longer housed large marine animals. A new area called "Window to the Ocean" opened in the former otter tank, a fully interactive space designed for young children. A mini-amphitheatre was built with a giant interactive screen measuring 7.25 metres long by 2.70 metres high. Children can interact with the screen and watch various educational films, covering not only the characteristics of the fish found in the aquarium but also aspects related to the oceans and their conservation.

The downstairs area of the aquarium has five rooms and around 90 aquariums and tanks, with more than 300 live marine species. There are thousands more species in the museum on the first floor, reflecting in part the collection acquired by King Carlos I.

== Visitors ==
The aquarium now averages 70,000 visitors per year. This contrasts with the 218,000 visitors recorded in 1992, reflecting competition from the much larger Lisbon Oceanarium, which was opened in 1998.
