= Pacific mud eel =

Scientific classification
- Kingdom: Animalia
- Phylum: Chordata
- Class: Actinopterygii
- Order: Anguilliformes
- Family: Heterenchelyidae
- Genus: Pythonichthys
- Species: P. asodes

Binomial name
- Pythonichthys asodes Rosenblatt & Rubinoff, 1972

Species of fish

The Pacific mud eel (Pythonichthys asodes) is an eel in the family Heterenchelyidae (mud eels). It was described by Richard Heinrich Rosenblatt and Ira Rubinoff in 1972. It is a tropical, marine eel which is known from the eastern central Pacific Ocean, including Costa Rica, El Salvador, Guatemala, Honduras, Mexico, Panama, and Nicaragua. It dwells at a maximum depth of 17 metres, typically habituating muddy substrates in estuaries. It is able to survive in water with a low salt concentration. Males can reach a maximum total length of 47.2 centimetres. The eels' diet consists primarily of benthic gastropods and worms, and bivalves.

Due to its wide distribution, lack of threats and lack of observed population declines, the IUCN redlist currently lists the Pacific mud eel as Least Concern.
