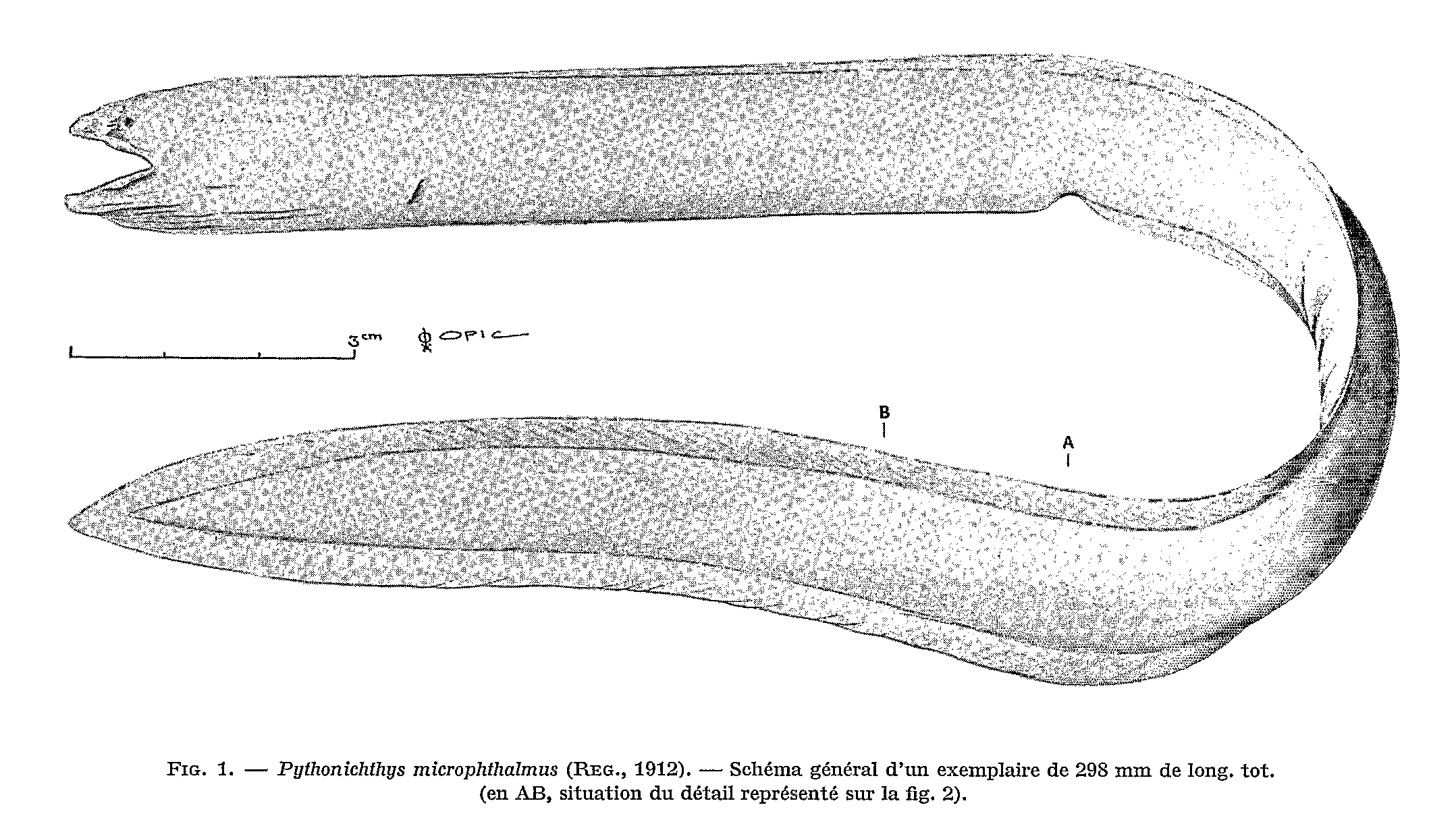

Scientific classification
- Kingdom: Animalia
- Phylum: Chordata
- Class: Actinopterygii
- Order: Anguilliformes
- Family: Heterenchelyidae
- Genus: Pythonichthys
- Species: P. microphthalmus

Binomial name
- Pythonichthys microphthalmus (Regan, 1912)

Synonyms
- Heterenchelys microphthalmus Regan, 1912

= Shorttailed shortfaced eel =

Species of fish

The shorttailed shortfaced eel (Pythonichthys microphthalmus) is an eel in the family Heterenchelyidae (mud eels). It was described by Charles Tate Regan in 1912, originally under the genus Heterenchelys. It is a tropical, marine eel which is known from Mauritania to Angola, in the eastern Atlantic Ocean. It typically dwells at a depth range of 40–150 metres. Males can reach a maximum total length of 50.5 centimetres.
