= Panturichthys fowleri =

Conservation status
- Data Deficient (IUCN 3.1)

Scientific classification
- Kingdom: Animalia
- Phylum: Chordata
- Class: Actinopterygii
- Order: Anguilliformes
- Family: Heterenchelyidae
- Genus: Panturichthys
- Species: P. fowleri

Binomial name
- Panturichthys fowleri (Ben-Tuvia, 1953)

Synonyms
- Lophenchelys fowleri Ben-Tuvia, 1953

Species of fish

Panturichthys fowleri, commonly known as Fowler's shortfaced eel, is an eel in the family Heterenchelyidae (mud eels). It was described by Adam Ben-Tuvia in 1953, originally under the genus Lophenchelys. It is a subtropical, marine eel which is known from a single specimen collected from Israel, in the Mediterranean Sea. The holotype specimen was discovered dwelling at a depth range of 27–55 metres.

The fish's name is in honor of Henry Weed Fowler (1878-1965), of the Academy of Natural Sciences of Philadelphia, for his help in determining the identity of two other undescribed fishes from Israel.
