= Slender shortfaced eel =

Scientific classification
- Domain: Eukaryota
- Kingdom: Animalia
- Phylum: Chordata
- Class: Actinopterygii
- Order: Anguilliformes
- Family: Heterenchelyidae
- Genus: Panturichthys
- Species: P. longus

Binomial name
- Panturichthys longus (Ehrenbaum, 1915)

Synonyms
- Heterenchelys longus Ehrenbaum, 1915

Species of fish

The slender shortfaced eel (Panturichthys longus) is an eel in the family Heterenchelyidae (mud eels). It was described by Ernst Ehrenbaum in 1915, originally under the genus Heterenchelys. It is a tropical, marine eel which is known from Benin to Angola in the Gulf of Guinea, in the eastern Atlantic Ocean. Males can reach a maximum total length of 149 centimetres.
