= Yano's snipe eel =

Scientific classification
- Domain: Eukaryota
- Kingdom: Animalia
- Phylum: Chordata
- Class: Actinopterygii
- Order: Anguilliformes
- Family: Nemichthyidae
- Genus: Labichthys
- Species: L. yanoi

Binomial name
- Labichthys yanoi (Mead & Rubinoff, 1966)

Synonyms
- Avocettinops yanoi Mead & Rubinoff, 1966

Species of fish

The Yano's snipe eel (Labichthys yanoi) is an eel in the family Nemichthyidae (snipe eels). It was described by Giles Willis Mead and Ira Rubinoff in 1966, originally under the genus Avocettinops. It is a marine, deep water-dwelling eel which is known from New Zealand, in the southwestern Pacific Ocean.

== Etymology ==
The fish is named in honor of Shigeru Yano, of Honolulu, Hawai‘i whose maintenance and operation of the nets and the associated equipment contributed to the success of the authors’ trawling expeditions.
