= Longtailed shortfaced eel =

Scientific classification
- Kingdom: Animalia
- Phylum: Chordata
- Class: Actinopterygii
- Division: Teleostei
- Order: Anguilliformes
- Family: Heterenchelyidae
- Genus: Pythonichthys
- Species: P. macrurus

Binomial name
- Pythonichthys macrurus (Regan, 1912)

Synonyms
- Heterenchelys macrurus Regan, 1912

Species of fish

The longtailed shortfaced eel (Pythonichthys macrurus) is an eel in the family Heterenchelyidae (mud eels). It was described by Charles Tate Regan in 1912, originally under the genus Heterenchelys. It is a tropical, marine eel which is known from coastal waters ranging from Sierra Leone to Angola, in the eastern Atlantic Ocean. Males can reach a maximum total length of 80 centimetres.
