= Pythonichthys sanguineus =

Scientific classification
- Kingdom: Animalia
- Phylum: Chordata
- Class: Actinopterygii
- Order: Anguilliformes
- Family: Heterenchelyidae
- Genus: Pythonichthys
- Species: P. sanguineus

Binomial name
- Pythonichthys sanguineus Poey, 1868

Species of fish

Pythonichthys sanguineus is an eel in the family Heterenchelyidae (mud eels). It was described by Felipe Poey in 1868. It is a tropical, marine eel which is known from Cuba, Puerto Rico, and Suriname, in the western central Atlantic Ocean. It leads a benthic lifestyle, dwelling in reefs or rocky regions at a maximum depth of 37 metres. Males can reach a maximum total length of 41.9 centimetres.
