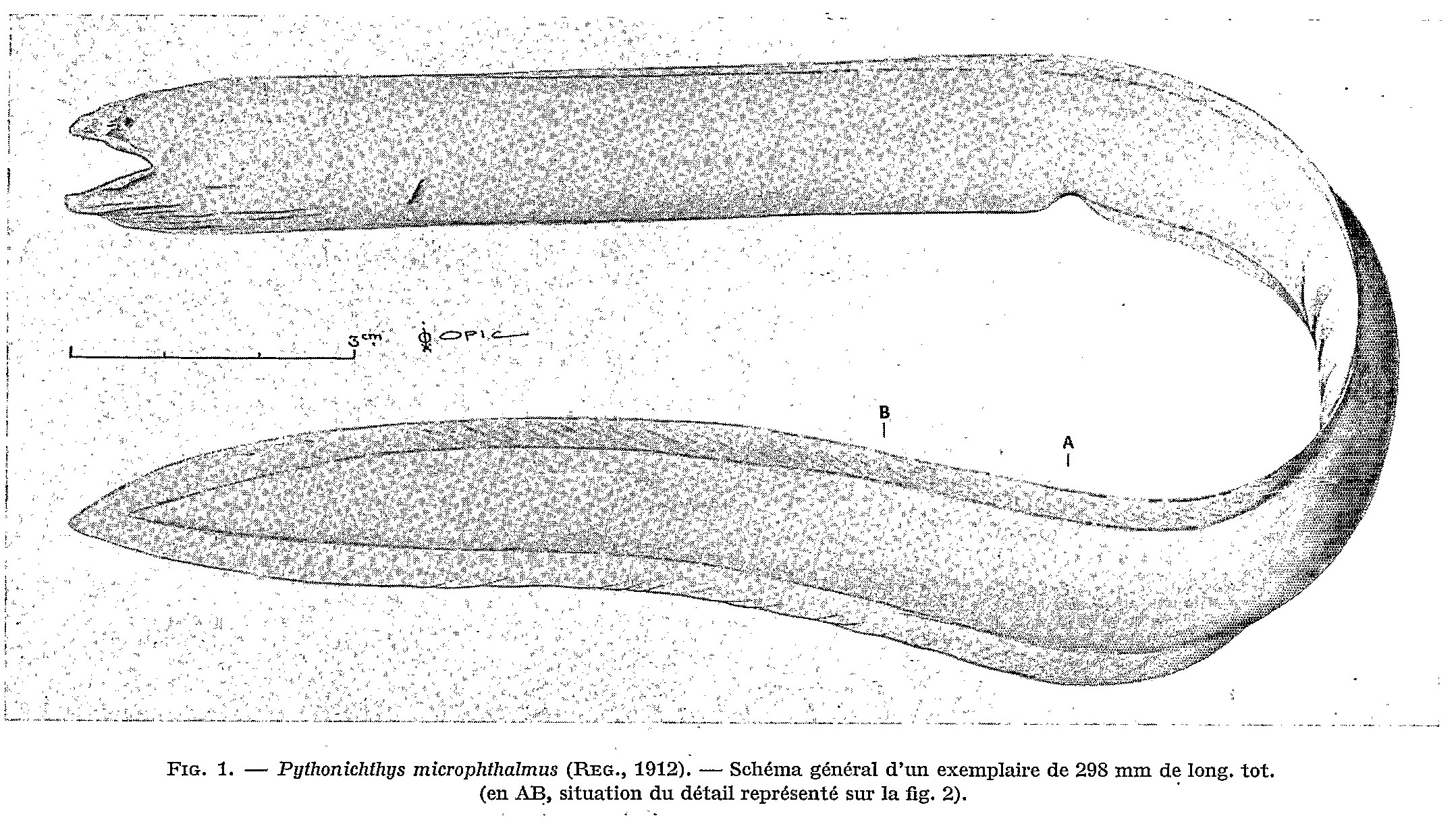
- P. microphthalmus

Scientific classification
- Kingdom: Animalia
- Phylum: Chordata
- Class: Actinopterygii
- Order: Anguilliformes
- Family: Heterenchelyidae
- Genus: Pythonichthys; Poey, 1868

Type species
- Pythonichthys sanguineus Poey, 1868

Synonyms
- Heterenchelys Regan, 1912

= Pythonichthys =

Pythonichthys Temporal range: Maastrichtian–present

Genus of fishes

Pythonichthys is a genus of eels of the family Heterenchelyidae that occur in tropical waters of the eastern Pacific Ocean off of Panama and in the Atlantic Ocean near the Caribbean Sea and the west coast of Africa. It contains the following described species:

- Pythonichthys asodes Rosenblatt & Rubinoff, 1972 (Pacific mud eel)
- Pythonichthys macrurus (Regan, 1912) (Long-tailed short-faced eel)
- Pythonichthys microphthalmus (Regan, 1912) (Short-tailed short-faced eel)
- Pythonichthys sanguineus Poey, 1868 (no common name)

In addition, the fossil species Pythonichthys arkansasensis Schwarzhans & Stringer, 2020 is known by otoliths from the Late Cretaceous (Maastrichtian) and Early Paleocene of Texas and Arkansas, USA. Its fossils are very common in formations shortly after the Cretaceous-Paleogene extinction event, suggesting that it was a disaster taxon that thrived in the wake of the extinction. Otolith taxa Pythonichthys claibornensis (Dante & Frizzell, 1965) and Pythonichthys texanus (Dante & Frizzell, 1965) from the Eocene of Texas are also included in the genus.
