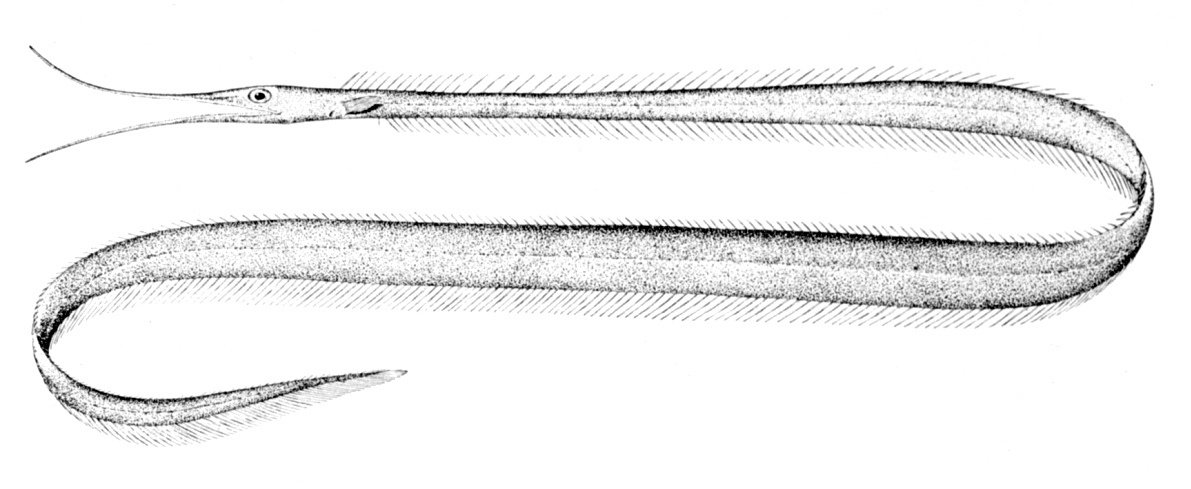
- Labichthys carinatus

Scientific classification
- Kingdom: Animalia
- Phylum: Chordata
- Class: Actinopterygii
- Order: Anguilliformes
- Family: Nemichthyidae
- Genus: Labichthys; T. N. Gill and Ryder, 1883

Type species
- Labichthys carinatus Gill & Ryder, 1883

Species
- See text

= Labichthys =

Genus of fishes

Labichthys is a genus of eels in the snipe-eel family Nemichthyidae. It currently contains the following species:

- Labichthys carinatus T. N. Gill and Ryder, 1883
- Labichthys yanoi (Mead & Rubinoff, 1966) (Yano's snipe-eel)
