= Mauritanian shortface eel =

Scientific classification
- Domain: Eukaryota
- Kingdom: Animalia
- Phylum: Chordata
- Class: Actinopterygii
- Order: Anguilliformes
- Family: Heterenchelyidae
- Genus: Panturichthys
- Species: P. mauritanicus

Binomial name
- Panturichthys mauritanicus Pellegrin, 1913

Synonyms
- Pantaurichthys mauritanicus (Pellegrin, 1913); Ophisichthys dubius Osório, 1917

Species of fish

The Mauritanian shortface eel (Panturichthys mauritanicus) is an eel in the family Heterenchelyidae (mud eels). It was described by Jacques Pellegrin in 1913. It is a tropical, marine eel which is known from the eastern Atlantic Ocean, where it is distributed from Morocco to Guinea (including Mauritania, from which its species epithet and common name are derived). It typically dwells at a depth range of 30–1000 metres, habituating muddy substrates on the African continental shelf. Males can reach a maximum total length of 84 centimetres.

The Mauritanian shortface eel's diet primarily consists of benthic crustaceans, bivalves, and annelids.
