= Panturichthys isognathus =

Scientific classification
- Domain: Eukaryota
- Kingdom: Animalia
- Phylum: Chordata
- Class: Actinopterygii
- Order: Anguilliformes
- Family: Heterenchelyidae
- Genus: Panturichthys
- Species: P. isognathus

Binomial name
- Panturichthys isognathus Poll, 1953

Synonyms
- Pantaurichthys isognathus Poll, 1953 (misspelling)

Species of fish

Panturichthys isognathus is an eel in the family Heterenchelyidae (mud eels). It was described by Max Poll in 1953. It is a tropical, marine eel which is known from the Gulf of Guinea in the eastern Atlantic Ocean, where it predominates south of the equator. It is a demersal fish that typically dwells at a depth range of 40–150 metres. Males can reach a maximum total length of 32.5 centimetres.
