= Nemichthys larseni =

Scientific classification
- Domain: Eukaryota
- Kingdom: Animalia
- Phylum: Chordata
- Class: Actinopterygii
- Order: Anguilliformes
- Family: Nemichthyidae
- Genus: Nemichthys
- Species: N. larseni

Binomial name
- Nemichthys larseni J. G. Nielsen & D. G. Smith, 1978

Species of fish

Nemichthys larseni is an eel in the family Nemichthyidae (snipe eels). It was described by Jørgen G. Nielsen and David G. Smith in 1978. It is a marine, deep water-dwelling eel which is known from the eastern Pacific Ocean, including Oregon and Hawaii, USA, Mexico, and the Gulf of California. It dwells at a depth range of 0 to 1,000 metres (0 to 3,281 ft). Males can reach a maximum total length of 161 centimetres (63 in).

== Etymology ==
The species epithet "larseni" was given in honour of Verner Larsen, credited with starting the study of the species at the University of Copenhagen.
