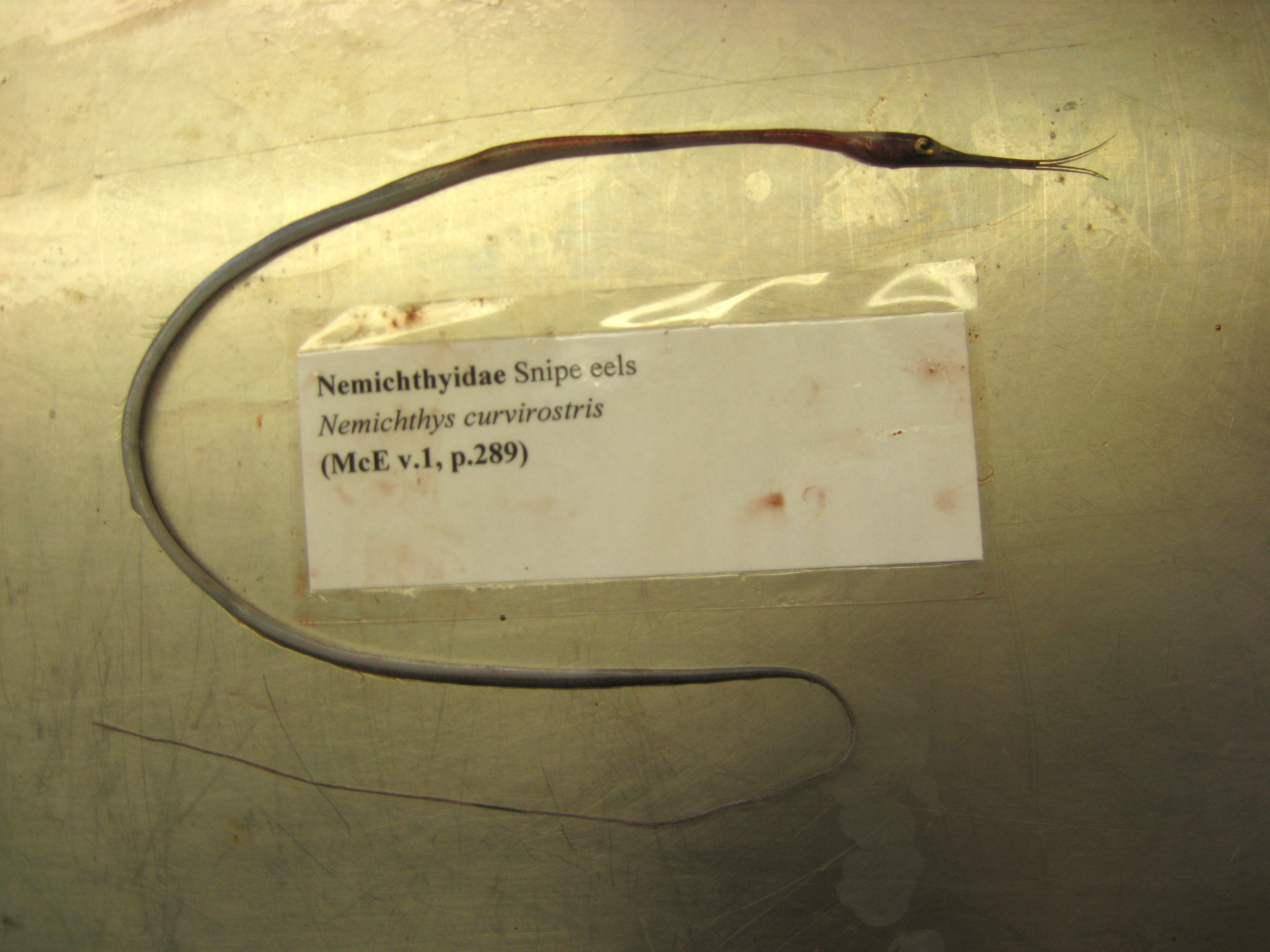

Scientific classification
- Kingdom: Animalia
- Phylum: Chordata
- Class: Actinopterygii
- Order: Anguilliformes
- Family: Nemichthyidae
- Genus: Nemichthys
- Species: N. curvirostris

Binomial name
- Nemichthys curvirostris (Strömman, 1896)

Synonyms
- Leptocephalus curvirostris Leptocephalus polymerus

= Nemichthys curvirostris =

Species of fish

Nemichthys curvirostris, the boxer snipe eel, is a snipe eel of the family Nemichthyidae. Like other snipe eels, they have incredibly narrow and elongated bodies, and small fins.

== Habitat ==
The eel lives at depths of up to 2,000 m. It has a probable global distribution.

== Description ==
The length is up to 143 centimetres (4.69 ft). It has long, narrow fine-boned delicate jaws, which are curved, and have small hooked teeth for swiping crustaceans, zooplankton, and sea snow from the water column. This eel is extremely delicate at touch, with a somewhat smooth, slimy skin, and diminutive eyes which are positioned near the rear end of the jaws.

== Biology ==
Feeds on crustaceans like amphipods, copepods, shrimp, and possibly also consumes fish eggs and sea snow. Reproduction is oviparous.
