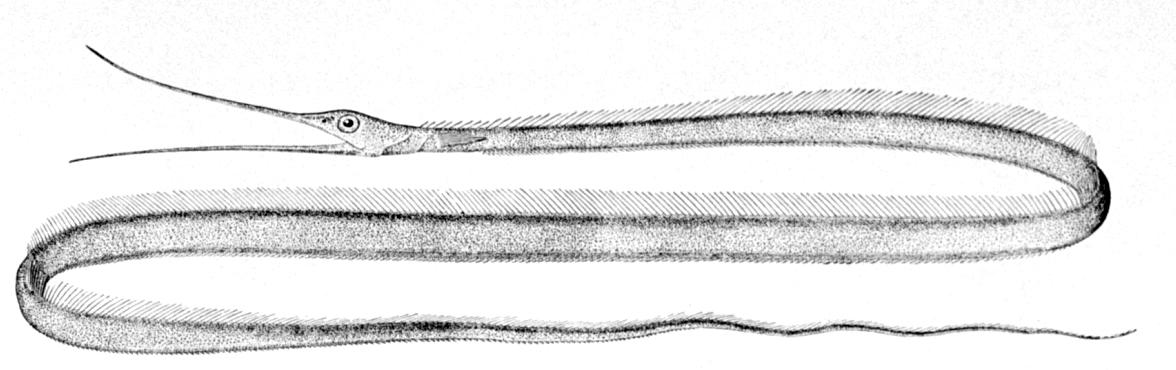
- Slender Snipe Eel, Nemichthys scolopaceus

Scientific classification
- Kingdom: Animalia
- Phylum: Chordata
- Class: Actinopterygii
- Order: Anguilliformes
- Family: Nemichthyidae
- Genus: Nemichthys; Richardson, 1848

Type species
- Nemichthys scolopaceus Richardson, 1848

Species
- See text

Synonyms
- Belonopsis Brandt, 1851; Leptorhynchus Lowe, 1851; Investigator Goode, 1896; Nematoprora Gilbert, 1905; Tilurella Roule, 1911; Cercomitus Weber [M.] 1913; Paravocettinops Kanazawa & Maul, 1967

= Nemichthys =

Genus of fishes

Nemichthys is a genus of eels in the snipe-eel family Nemichthyidae. It currently contains the following species:

- Nemichthys curvirostris (Strömman, 1896) (boxer snipe-eel)
- Nemichthys larseni J. G. Nielsen & D. G. Smith, 1978
- Nemichthys scolopaceus J. Richardson, 1848 (slender snipe-eel)
