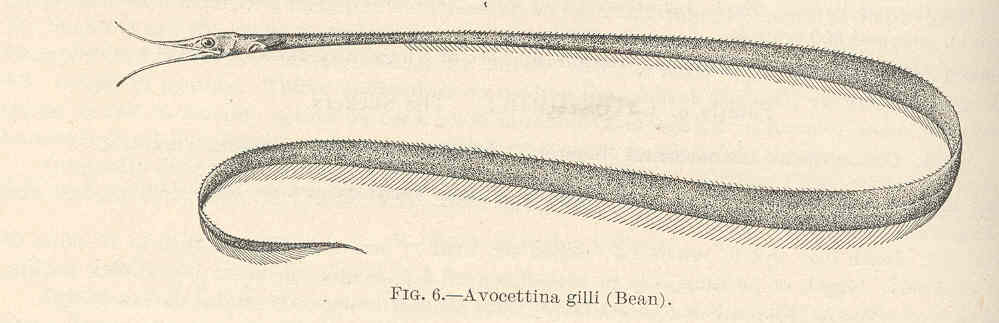

Scientific classification
- Kingdom: Animalia
- Phylum: Chordata
- Class: Actinopterygii
- Order: Anguilliformes
- Family: Nemichthyidae
- Genus: Avocettina
- Species: A. infans

Binomial name
- Avocettina infans Günther, 1878

Synonyms
- Leptocephalus oxycephalus

= Avocet snipe eel =

Species of fish

The avocet snipe eel (Avocettina infans) is a snipe eel of the family Nemichthyidae, found in all oceans except the Mediterranean and the eastern Pacific, at depths between 50 and 4,500 m. Their length is up to 75 centimetres (2.46 ft).
