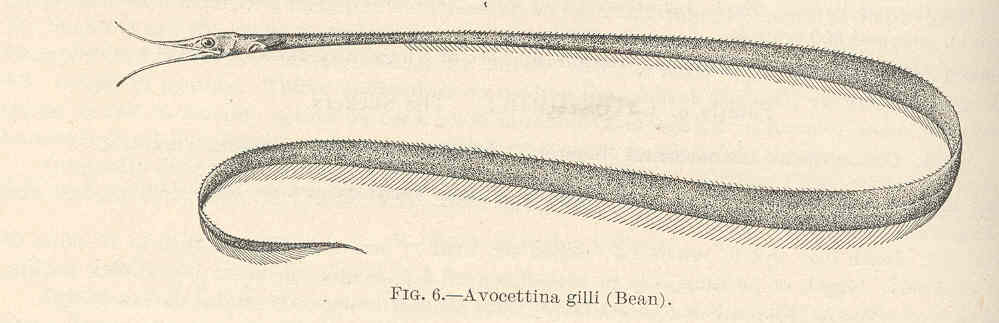
- Avocet snipe-eel

Scientific classification
- Domain: Eukaryota
- Kingdom: Animalia
- Phylum: Chordata
- Class: Actinopterygii
- Order: Anguilliformes
- Family: Nemichthyidae
- Genus: Avocettina; D. S. Jordan & B. M. Davis, 1891

Type species
- Nemichthys infans Günther, 1878

Species
- See text

= Avocettina =

Genus of fishes

Avocettina is a genus of eels in the snipe-eel family Nemichthyidae. It currently contains the following species:

- Avocettina acuticeps (Regan, 1916) (Southern snipe-eel)
- Avocettina bowersii (Garman, 1899)
- Avocettina infans (Günther, 1878) (Avocet snipe-eel)
- Avocettina paucipora J. G. Nielsen & D. G. Smith, 1978
