= Avocettina acuticeps =

Scientific classification
- Kingdom: Animalia
- Phylum: Chordata
- Class: Actinopterygii
- Order: Anguilliformes
- Family: Nemichthyidae
- Genus: Avocettina
- Species: A. acuticeps

Binomial name
- Avocettina acuticeps (Regan, 1916)

Synonyms
- Leptocephalus acuticeps Regan, 1916; Borodinula major Karmovskaya, 1977

Species of fish

Avocettina acuticeps, the southern snipe eel or southern fintail snipe eel, is an eel in the family Nemichthyidae (snipe eels). It was described by Charles Tate Regan in 1916, originally under the genus Leptocephalus. It is a marine, deep water-dwelling eel which is known from throughout the southern regions of the ocean, with the exception of the eastern Pacific. It is known to dwell at a maximum depth of 2,000 metres (6,600 ft). Males can reach a maximum total length of 77 centimetres (30 in).

Avocettina acuticeps is not of commercial interest to fisheries.
