= Avocettina paucipora =

Conservation status
- Least Concern (IUCN 3.1)

Scientific classification
- Kingdom: Animalia
- Phylum: Chordata
- Class: Actinopterygii
- Order: Anguilliformes
- Family: Nemichthyidae
- Genus: Avocettina
- Species: A. paucipora

Binomial name
- Avocettina paucipora J. G. Nielsen & D. G. Smith, 1978

Species of fish

Avocettina paucipora is an eel in the family Nemichthyidae (snipe eels). It was described by Jørgen G. Nielsen and David G. Smith in 1978. It is a marine, temperate water-dwelling eel which is known from the southwestern Atlantic, southern Indian, and the Pacific Ocean. They can reach a maximum total length of 55 centimetres.

A. paucipora is of no commercial interest to fisheries.
