= Avocettina bowersii =

Scientific classification
- Kingdom: Animalia
- Phylum: Chordata
- Class: Actinopterygii
- Order: Anguilliformes
- Family: Nemichthyidae
- Genus: Avocettina
- Species: A. bowersii

Binomial name
- Avocettina bowersii (Garman, 1899)

Synonyms
- Labichthys bowersii Garman, 1899; Avocettina bowersi (Garman, 1899)

Species of fish

Avocettina bowersii is an eel in the family Nemichthyidae (snipe eels). It was described by Samuel Garman in 1899. It is a marine, deep water-dwelling eel which is known from California, U.S.A.; Peru, and Chile. It dwells at a depth range of 92–641 metres, although the type specimen was collected from a depth of 2,692 metres.

A. bowersii is believed to be a semelparous species.
