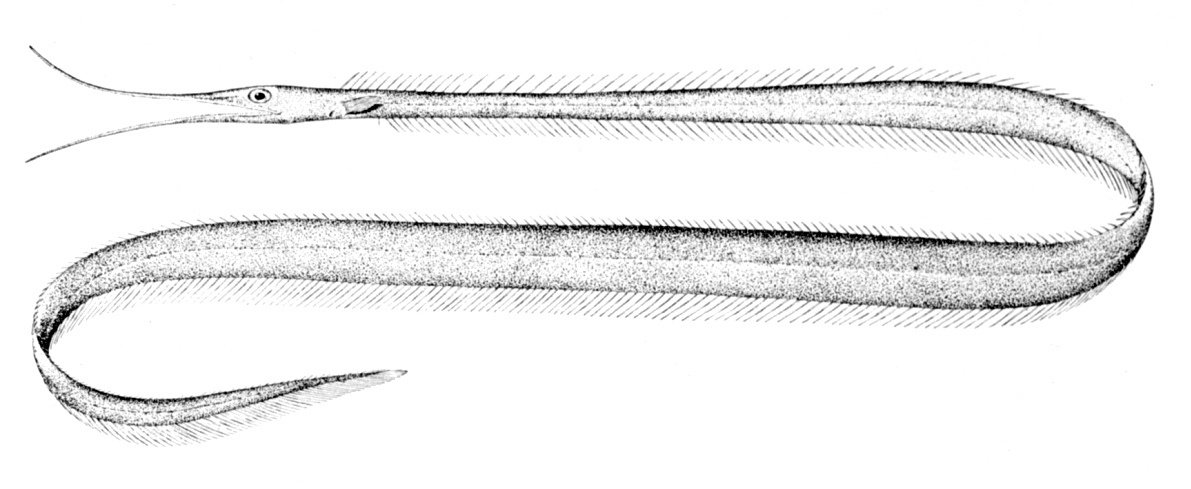

Scientific classification
- Domain: Eukaryota
- Kingdom: Animalia
- Phylum: Chordata
- Class: Actinopterygii
- Order: Anguilliformes
- Family: Nemichthyidae
- Genus: Labichthys
- Species: L. carinatus

Binomial name
- Labichthys carinatus T. N. Gill & Ryder, 1883

= Labichthys carinatus =

Species of fish

Labichthys carinatus is an eel in the family Nemichthyidae (snipe eels). It was described by Theodore Gill and John Adam Ryder in 1883. It is a marine, deep water-dwelling eel which is known from the western Indian Ocean, eastern and western Atlantic and eastern Pacific Ocean, including the Canary Islands, the United States (including Hawaii), Brazil, and Madagascar. It is known to dwell at a depth range of 0 to 2,000 metres (0 to 6,562 ft). Males can reach a maximum total length of 80 centimetres (31 in).
