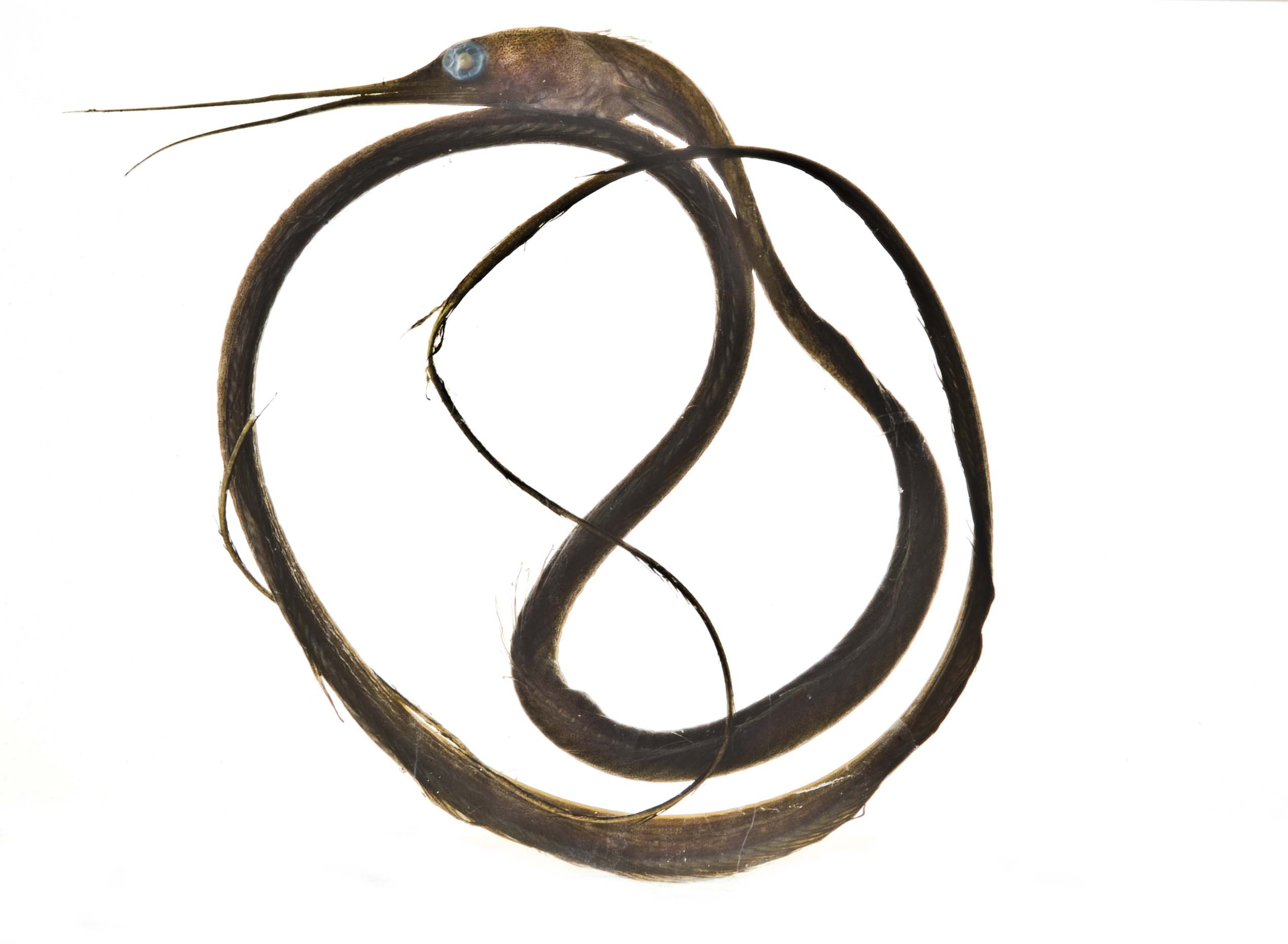

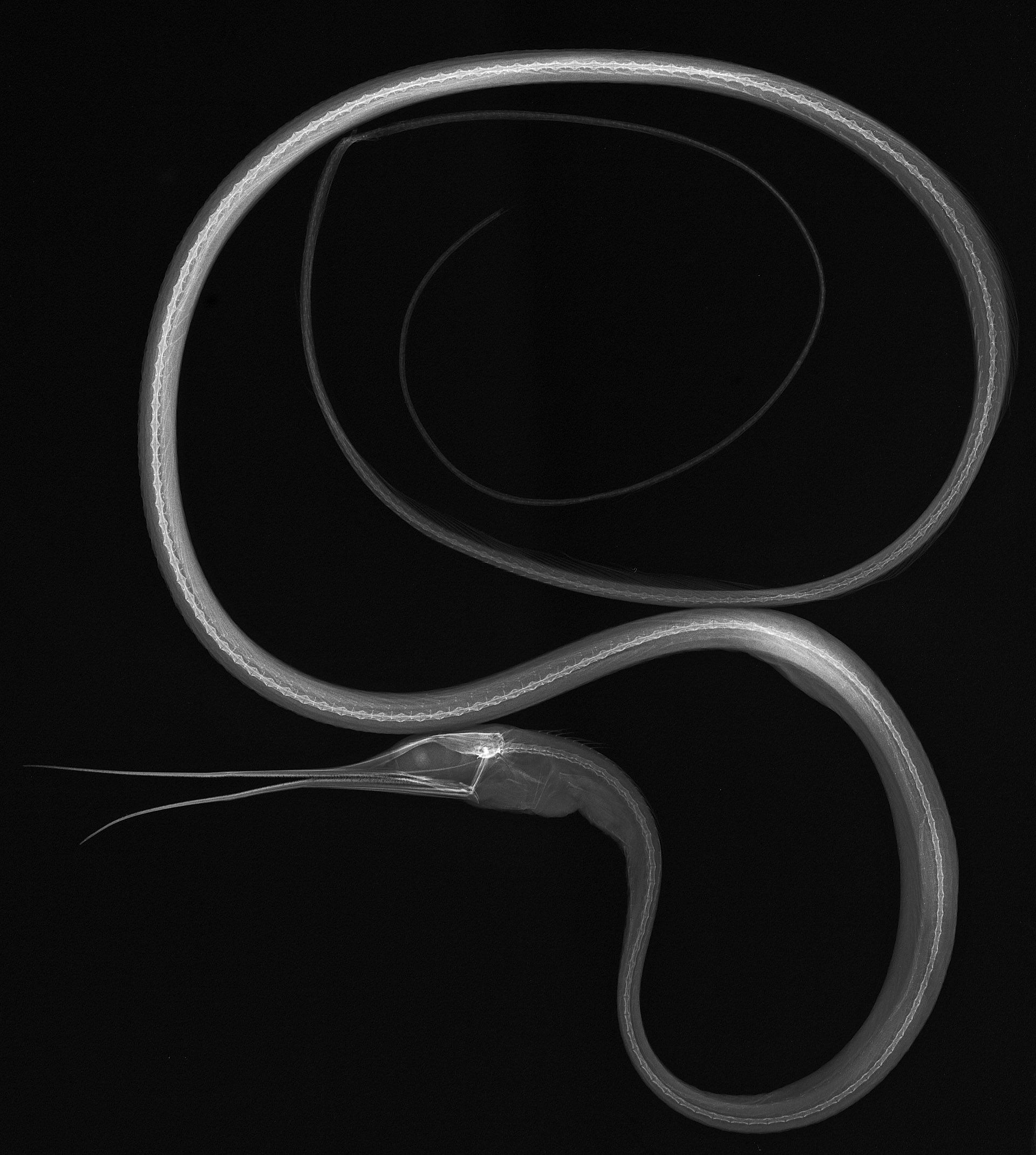
- Nemichthys scolopaceus, X-ray image

Conservation status
- Least Concern (IUCN 3.1)

Scientific classification
- Kingdom: Animalia
- Phylum: Chordata
- Class: Actinopterygii
- Order: Anguilliformes
- Family: Nemichthyidae
- Genus: Nemichthys
- Species: N. scolopaceus

Binomial name
- Nemichthys scolopaceus J. Richardson, 1848

= Slender snipe eel =

Species of fish

The slender snipe eel (Nemichthys scolopaceus), also known as the deep sea duck, is a fish that can weigh only a few ounces, yet reach 5 feet or 1.5 m in length. Features include a bird-like beak with curving tips, covered with tiny hooked teeth, which they use to sweep through the water to catch shrimp and other crustaceans. It has a lifespan of ten years.

It has more vertebrae in its backbone than any other animal, around 750. However, its anus has moved forward during its evolution and is now located on its throat. Its larvae are shaped like leaves, which actually get smaller before transforming into adults.

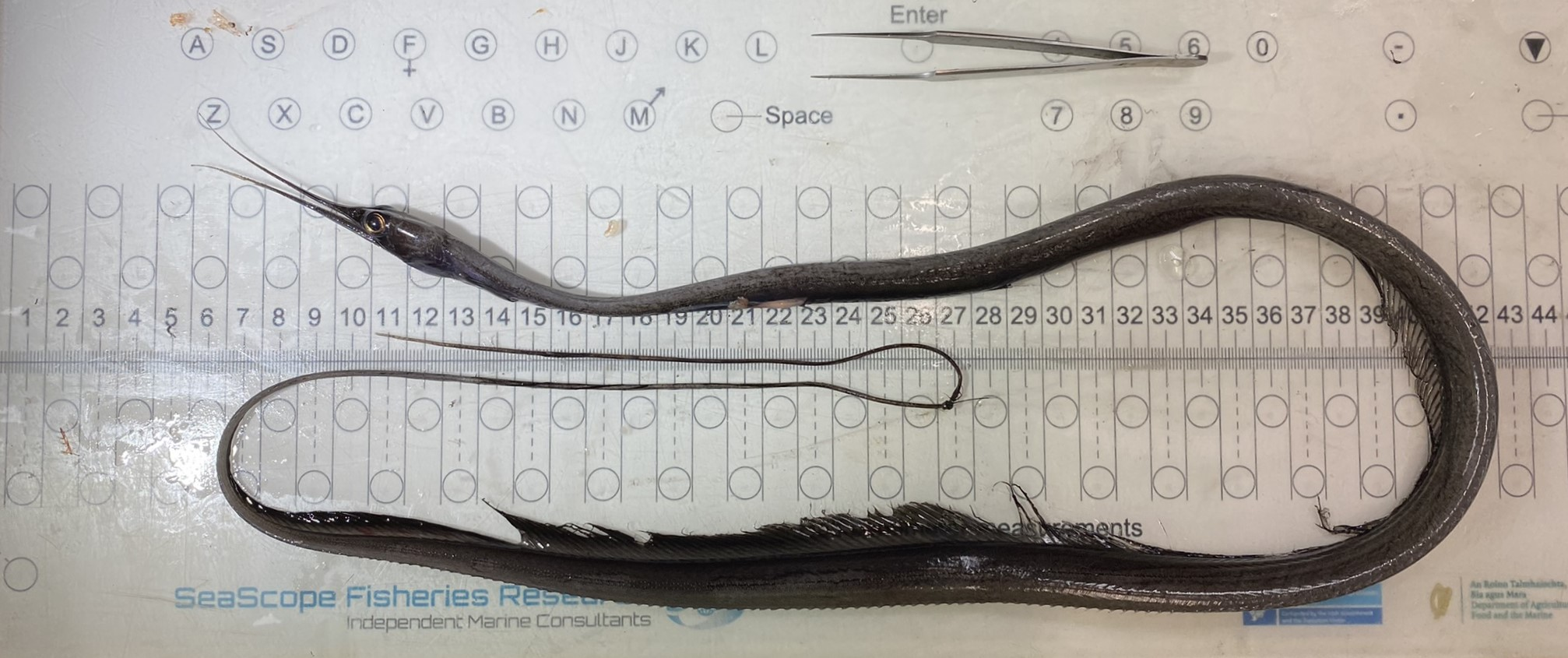
Fresh specimen of N. scolopaceus.

Many specimens found in museums were spat up from larger fish that were caught in trawls. Juveniles have been recorded at 100 meters in the Mediterranean sea and do not perform vertical migration. Adults can be found from the surface to 4,000 meters in the North Atlantic, and perform diurnal migration. Their reproduction is done by spawning, which is when females lay the eggs and the males lay their sperm into the water at the same time. The slender snipe eel only spawns once in their lifetime as they die after spawning. It is difficult for scientists to research these organisms because of the extreme environment they inhabit. In addition, the conservation status of the slender snipe eel is not well known.
