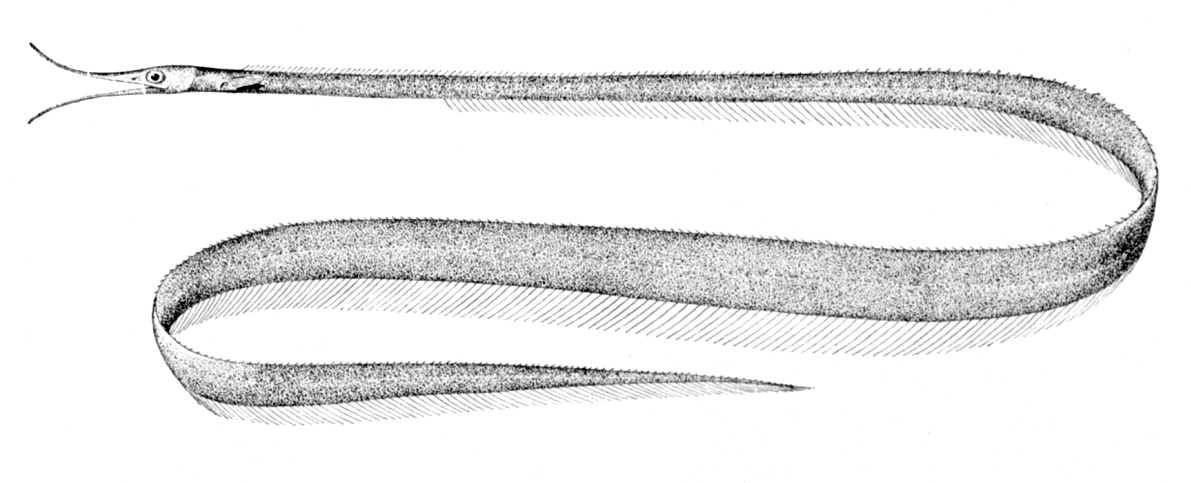
- Avocet snipe eel

Scientific classification
- Kingdom: Animalia
- Phylum: Chordata
- Class: Actinopterygii
- Order: Anguilliformes
- Suborder: Anguilloidei
- Family: Nemichthyidae; Kaup, 1859

Genera
- See table

= Snipe eel =

Snipe eels

Family of fishes

Snipe eels are a family, Nemichthyidae, of eels that consists of nine species in three genera. They are pelagic fishes, found in every ocean, mostly at depths of 300–600 m (980–1,970 ft) but sometimes as deep as 4,000 m (13,000 ft). Depending on the species, adults may reach 1–2 m (39–79 in) in length, yet they weigh only 80–400 g (2.8–14.1 oz). They are distinguished by their very slender jaws that separate toward the tips as the upper jaw curves upward. The jaws appear similar to the beak of the bird called the snipe. Snipe eels are oviparous, and the juveniles, called Leptocephali (meaning small head), do not resemble the adults but have oval, leaf-shaped and transparent bodies. Different species of snipe eel have different shapes, sizes and colors. The similarly named bobtail snipe eel is actually in a different family and represented by two species, the black Cyema atrum and the bright red Neocyema erythrosoma.

== Genera and species ==
There are nine species in three genera:

Snipe eels (family Nemichthyidae)
Genus	Image	Scientific name	Common name	Max length (cm)	Max weight (kg)	Max age (years)	Dorsal rays	Anal rays	Depth (m)	Fish Base	ITIS	IUCN status
Avocettina		Avocettina acuticeps (Regan, 1916)	Southern snipe eel	77			325–436	280–368	to 2000			Not assessed
Avocettina		Avocettina bowersii (Garman, 1899)							92–641			Not assessed
Avocettina		Avocettina infans (Günther, 1878)	Avocet snipe eel	80			to 350	265–270	0–4580			Not assessed
Avocettina		Avocettina paucipora Nielsen & Smith, 1978		55			254–297	218–257				Not assessed
Labichthys		Labichthys carinatus Gill & Ryder, 1883		80					0–2000			Not assessed
Labichthys		Labichthys yanoi (Mead & Rubinoff, 1966)	Yano's snipe eel									Not assessed
Nemichthys		Nemichthys curvirostris (Strömman, 1896)	Boxer snipe eel	143					0–2000			Not assessed
Nemichthys		Nemichthys larseni Nielsen & Smith, 1978		161			173–222	164–208	170–1280			Not assessed
Nemichthys		Nemichthys scolopaceus Richardson, 1848	Slender snipe eel	130			~350	~320	258–4337			Least Concern

== Characteristics ==
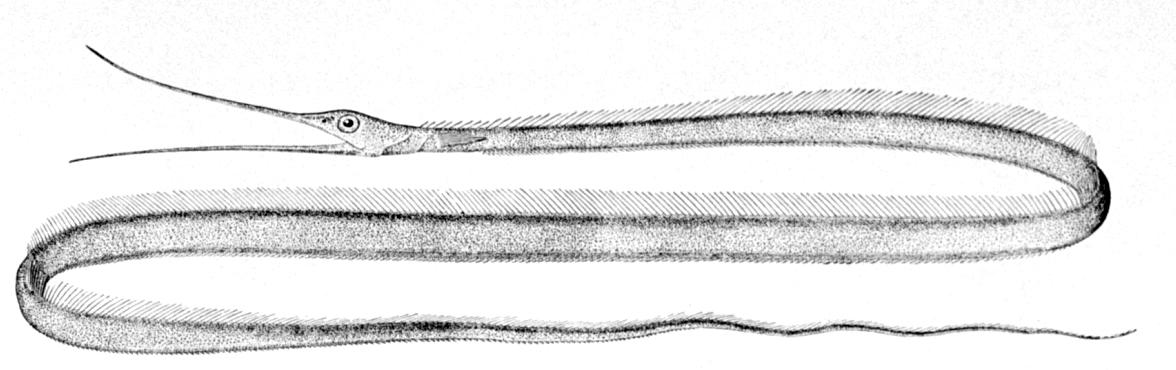
Slender snipe eel

Snipe eels have the long, slender body typical of eels. They are distinguished by their very slender jaws that separate toward the tips as the upper jaw curves upward and which appear similar to the beak of the bird called the snipe. The vent may be near the throat (as in N. scolopaceus) or further back on the body (as in A. gilli and A. infans). Depending on the species, adults may reach 30–60 inches long, and weigh only a few ounces to a pound. The dorsal fins show wide variation, too. For example, A. gilli has fewer than 280 rays in its dorsal fin, while A. infans has more than 320.

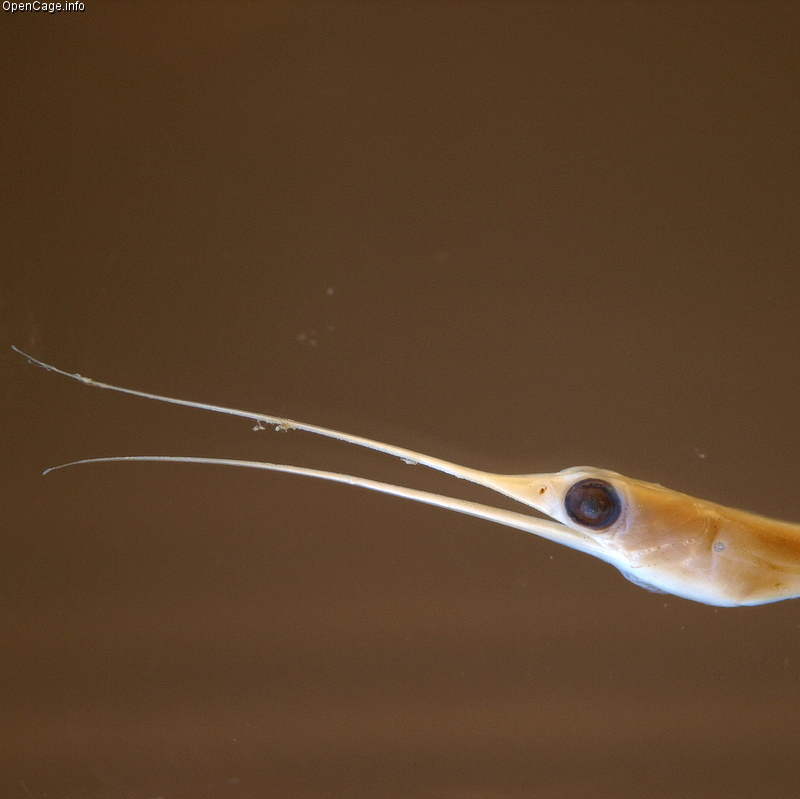
Nemichthys scolopaceus

The only food items actually found in the stomachs of snipe eels have been shrimp-like crustaceans, though ichthyologists believe they should be capable of catching and eating small fish and cephalopods also. Since predatory fish often feed on eel larvae, it is presumed by scientists and ichthyologists that they feed on snipe eel larvae as well. It is also thought that larger fish eat adult snipe eels though there is not much direct evidence for this.

== Distribution ==
A scale diagram of the layers of the pelagic zone. Mature snipe eels generally occupy the Bathypelagic Zone.

Snipe eels are found in every ocean and generally occupy depths of 300–600 m, though specimens have been caught nearer the surface at night, and storms occasionally result in individuals being stranded on the shore. Larval snipe eels occupy more shallow regions of 60–70 m before descending to metamorphose into adult form.

== Reproduction ==
Based on studies of several species of snipe eel in the Sargasso Sea and off the coast of California, it seems that snipe eels spawn mainly in the spring, but also into early summer. The juvenile forms of eels are generally called leptocephali (meaning "small head") and do not look like their adult forms. They are flat and transparent, taking forms that may be elongated or closer to the shape of a leaf. They remain in the larval form and near the surface (upper 200 m) for several months before descending to metamorphose. This is similar to other eel species but much longer than most other fish.

== Similar fish ==
The bobtail snipe eels are two species of deep-sea fishes in the family Cyematidae, one only in each of two genera. They are small elongate fishes, growing up to 16 centimeters (6.3 inches) long. They are bathypelagic (deep-water ocean-dwellers) and have been found down to 5,000 meters (16,000 feet). They are found in all oceans. Cyema atrum is black, while Neocyema erythrosoma is bright red.

Sawtooth eels are a family, Serrivomeridae, of eels found in temperate and tropical seas worldwide. Sawtooth eels get their name from the saw-like arrangement of inward-slanting teeth attached to the vomer bone in the roof of the mouth. They are deep water pelagic fish. There are eleven species of sawtooth eels in two genera:

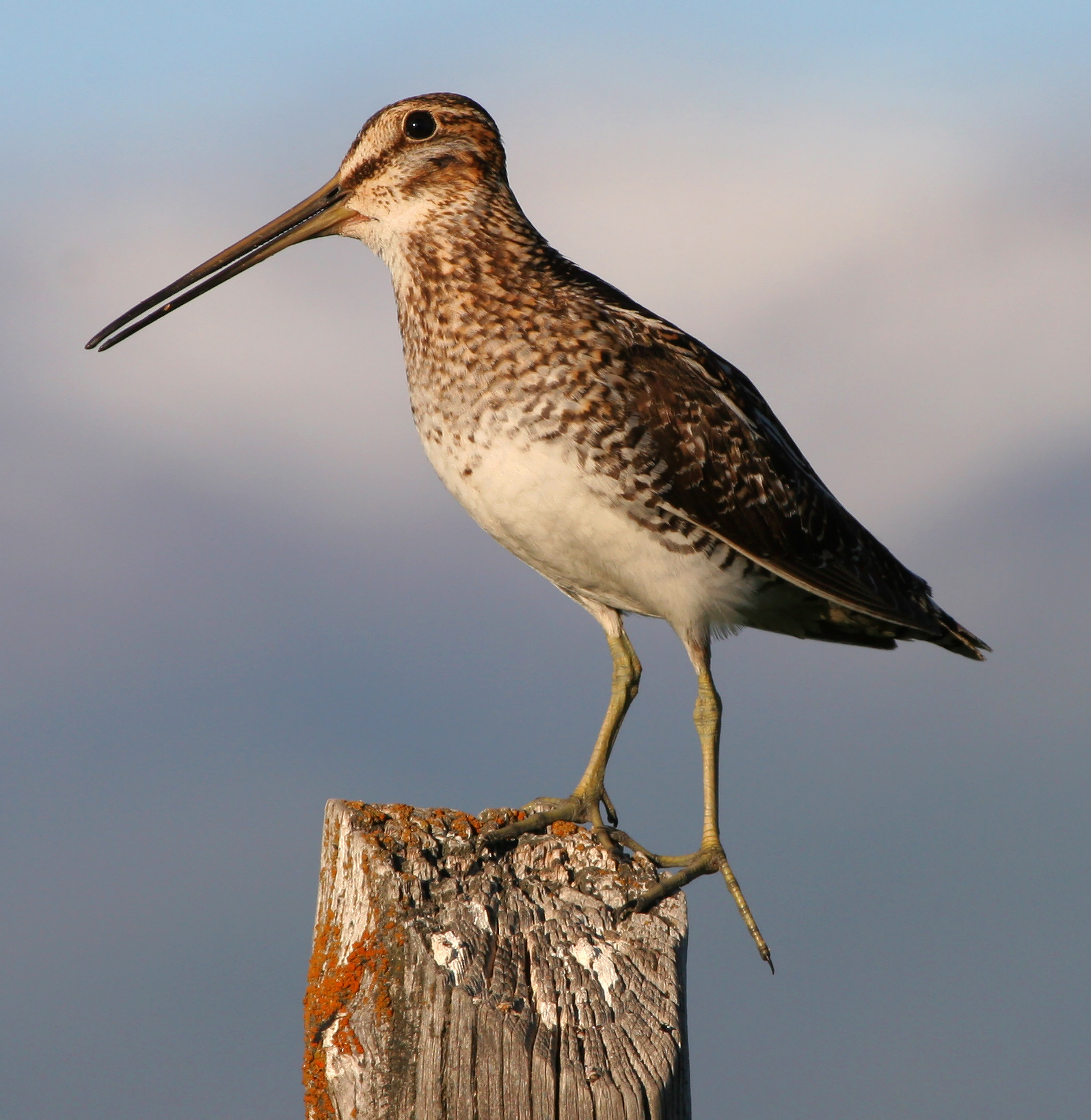
Snipe eels are so named because their jaws resemble the beak of the bird called the snipe

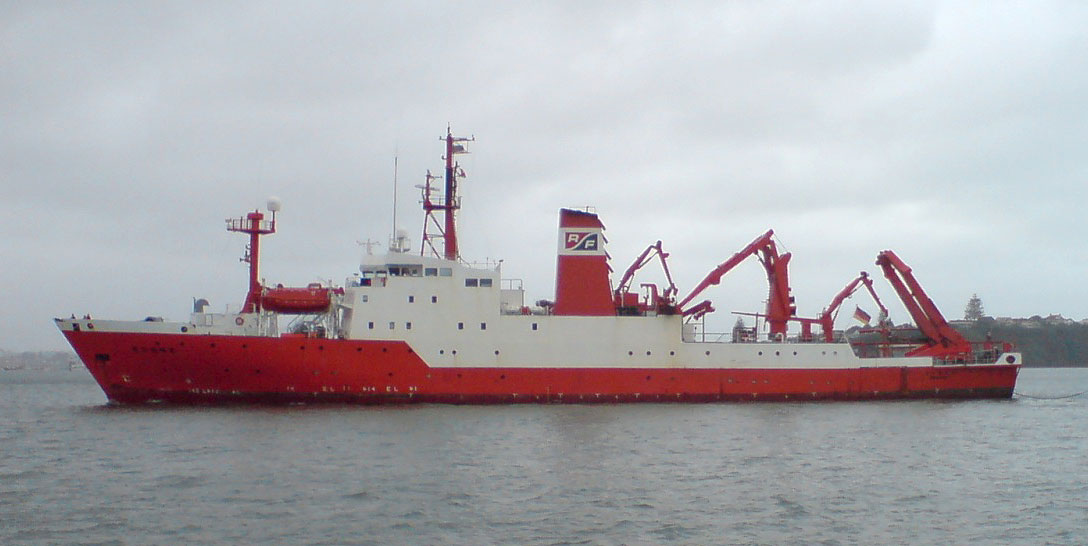
Most of what is known about snipe eels come from specimens caught by research vessels trawling at midwater depths.

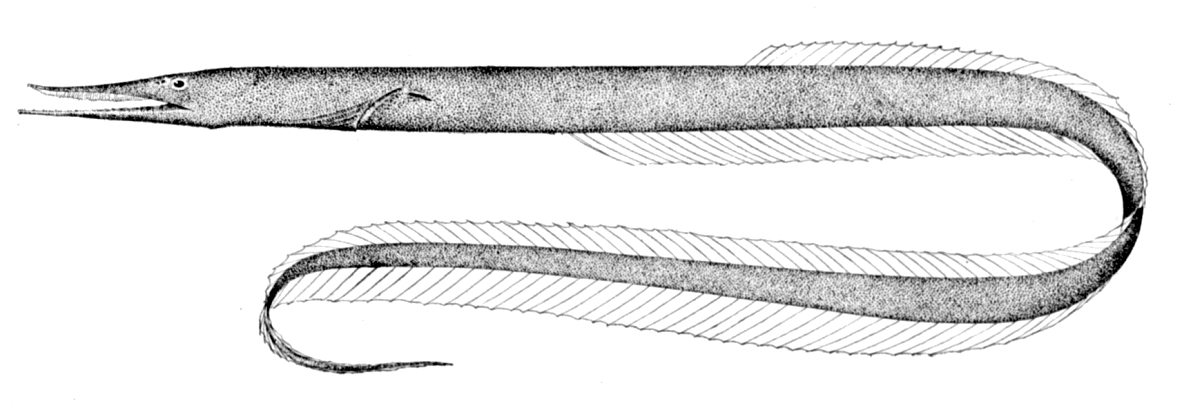
The sawtooth eel is so named because of the saw-like arrangement of its teeth.
