= Panturichthys =

Scientific classification
- Domain: Eukaryota
- Kingdom: Animalia
- Phylum: Chordata
- Class: Actinopterygii
- Order: Anguilliformes
- Family: Heterenchelyidae
- Genus: Panturichthys; Pellegrin, 1913

Type species
- Panturichthys mauritanicus Pellegrin, 1913

Synonyms
- Lophenchelys Ben-Tuvia, 1953; Ophisichthys Osório, 1917

Genus of fishes

Panturichthys is a genus of eels of the family Heterenchelyidae that occur in tropical waters along the west coast of Africa from the Gulf of Guinea to Morocco with one species known from the eastern Mediterranean near Israel. It contains the following described species:

- Panturichthys fowleri (Ben-Tuvia, 1953)
- Panturichthys isognathus Poll, 1953
- Panturichthys longus (Ehrenbaum, 1915)
- Panturichthys mauritanicus Pellegrin, 1913 (Mauritanian shortface eel)
