= Ira Rubinoff =

American marine biologist

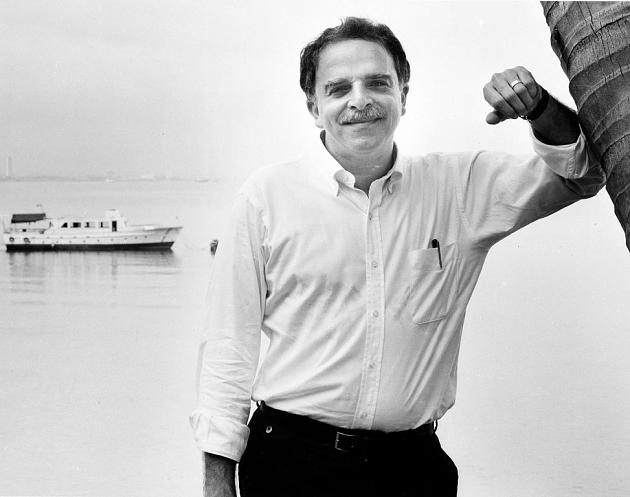
- Ira Rubinoff, 1987
- Born: 1938
- Occupation: Marine biologist
- Known for: Director of the Smithsonian Tropical Research Institute

Ira Rubinoff (born 1938) is an American marine biologist and was a former director of the Smithsonian Tropical Research Institute in Panama.

== Education ==
Ira Rubinoff attended Queens College, graduating in 1959, and went on to Harvard University. It was at Harvard where he studied under Ernst Mayr. He would graduate from Harvard with a Master of Arts in 1961, followed by a Ph.D. in biology in 1963. The following year, he started working at the Smithsonian Tropical Research Institute (STRI), and was the first marine biologist at the facility.

== Career ==
He eventually became assistant director of marine biology and was assistant to STRI director Martin Moynihan. At STRI he studied the evolution of fishes. At this time, STRI was called the Canal Zone Biological Area. It wasn't until 1966 that it was renamed the STRI. In 1970 Rubinoff became the assistant director of the research facility. Three years later he would become the director. As director of STRI, he focused heavily on fundraising, creating a $17 million endowment for the facility to fund scholarships and grants. He also modernized the facilities, and a smooth transition during the handing over of the Panama Canal to the Panama Canal Authority from the United States. In 2002 and 2007, Rubinoff would also serve as Acting Assistant Secretary and Acting Undersecretary for Science while Smithsonian administration changed.

Rubinoff served boards of the Instituto Conmemorativo Gorgas de Estudios de la Salud, the Charles Darwin Foundation, and the Smithsonian Institution. In 2011, Rubinoff was the recipient of the Smithsonian's Joseph Henry Medal.

== Research ==
As a marine biologist, Rubinoff was influenced by Ernst Mayr's in the early 1960s regarding the evolution of fishes at the Isthmus of Panama. Mayr assigned Rubinoff to travel to Panama, to study the evolution of various genera of fish of the region. Rubinoff pioneered research regarding the effect of the Panama Canal on the ocean's ecology and the evolution of animals within it. He also helped discover that yellow-bellied sea snakes can control their buoyancy, which allows them to dive as deep as 50 metres and float at certain depths.

== Notable awards ==
- Honorary Member, Association for Tropical Biology

== Publications ==
- Rubinoff, Ira. Eds. S. L. Sutton, T. C. Whitmore and A. C. Chadwick. A strategy for preserving tropical forests. In: Tropical Rain Forest: Ecology and Management. Oxford: Blackwell Scientific Publications (1983): 465–476.
- Rubinoff, Ira, J. Graham and J. Motta. "Diving behavior of the sea snake Pelamis platurus in the Gulf of Panama - I Depth and Duration of Dives." Marine Biology. 1986. 91(2): 181–191.
- Rubinoff, Ira and Egbert G. Leigh, Jr. "Dealing with Diversity: The Smithsonian Tropical Research and Tropical Biology." Trends in Ecology and Evolution. 1990. 5(4): 115–118.
- Rubinoff, Ira and Nicholas Smythe. "A jungle kept for study." New Scientist. 1982. 95 (1315) 495–499.

== See also ==
- Category:Taxa named by Ira Rubinoff
