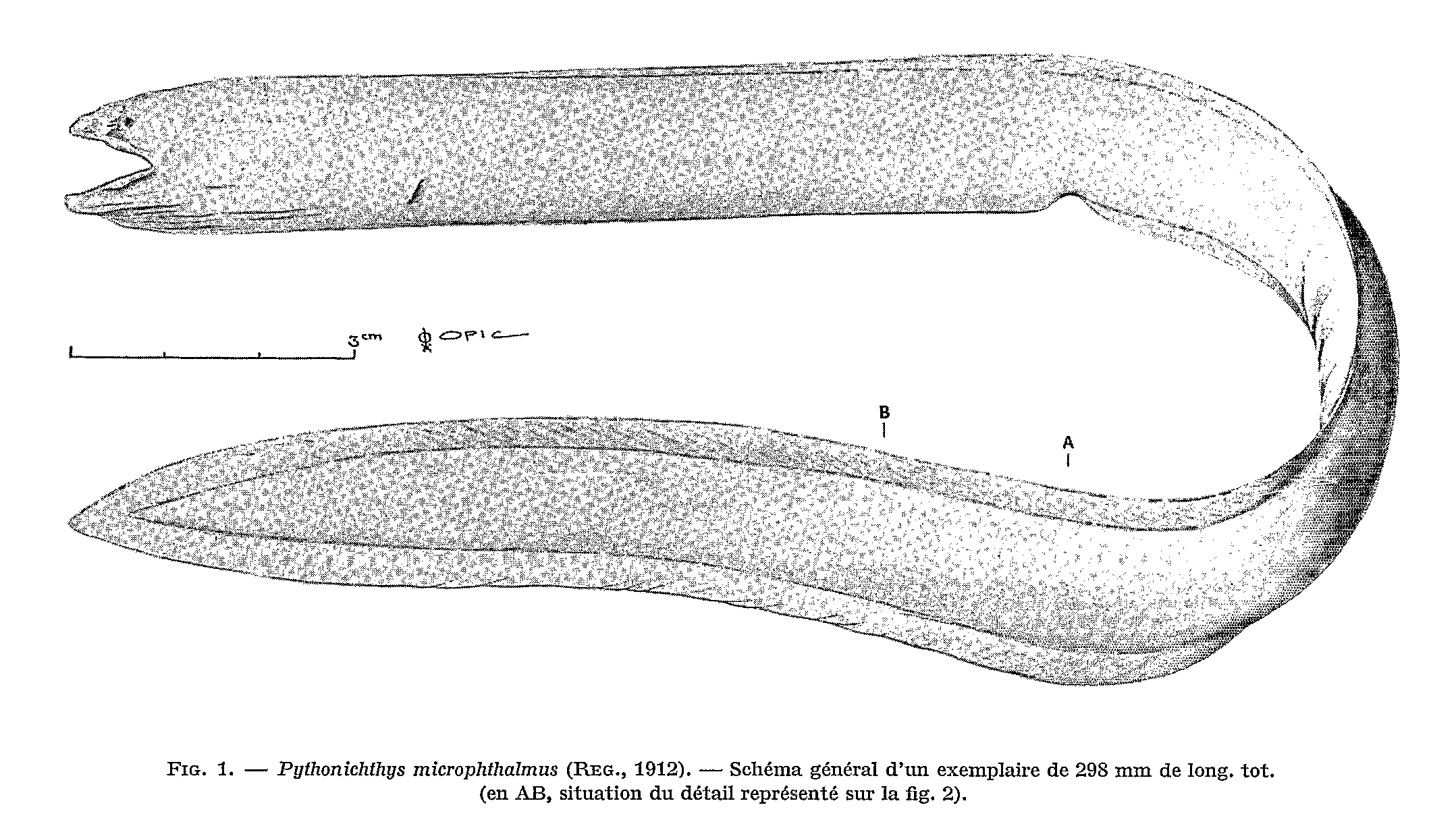
- Pythonichthys microphthalmus

Scientific classification
- Kingdom: Animalia
- Phylum: Chordata
- Class: Actinopterygii
- Order: Anguilliformes
- Suborder: Muraenoidei
- Family: Heterenchelyidae; Regan, 1912

Genera
- see text

= Heterenchelyidae =

Heterenchelyidae Temporal range: Maastrichtian–present

Family of fishes

The Heterenchelyidae or mud eels are a small family of eels native to the Atlantic, Mediterranean, and eastern Pacific.

Heterenchelyids are bottom-dwelling fish adapted to burrowing into soft mud. They have large mouths and no pectoral fins, and range from 32 to 149 cm (13 to 59 in) in length. Currently, eight species in two genera are recognized in this family.

The oldest known member of the family is Pythonichthys arkansasensis, known from fossilized otoliths from the Maastrichtian and Danian of the south-central United States.

== Genera ==
The Heterenchelyidae contains the following two genera:

- Panturichthys Pellegrin, 1913
- Pythonichthys Poey, 1868
