= List of fishes of California =

California has an exceptional diversity of marine and freshwater fish found in its waters. the following is a list of species, both native and introduced.

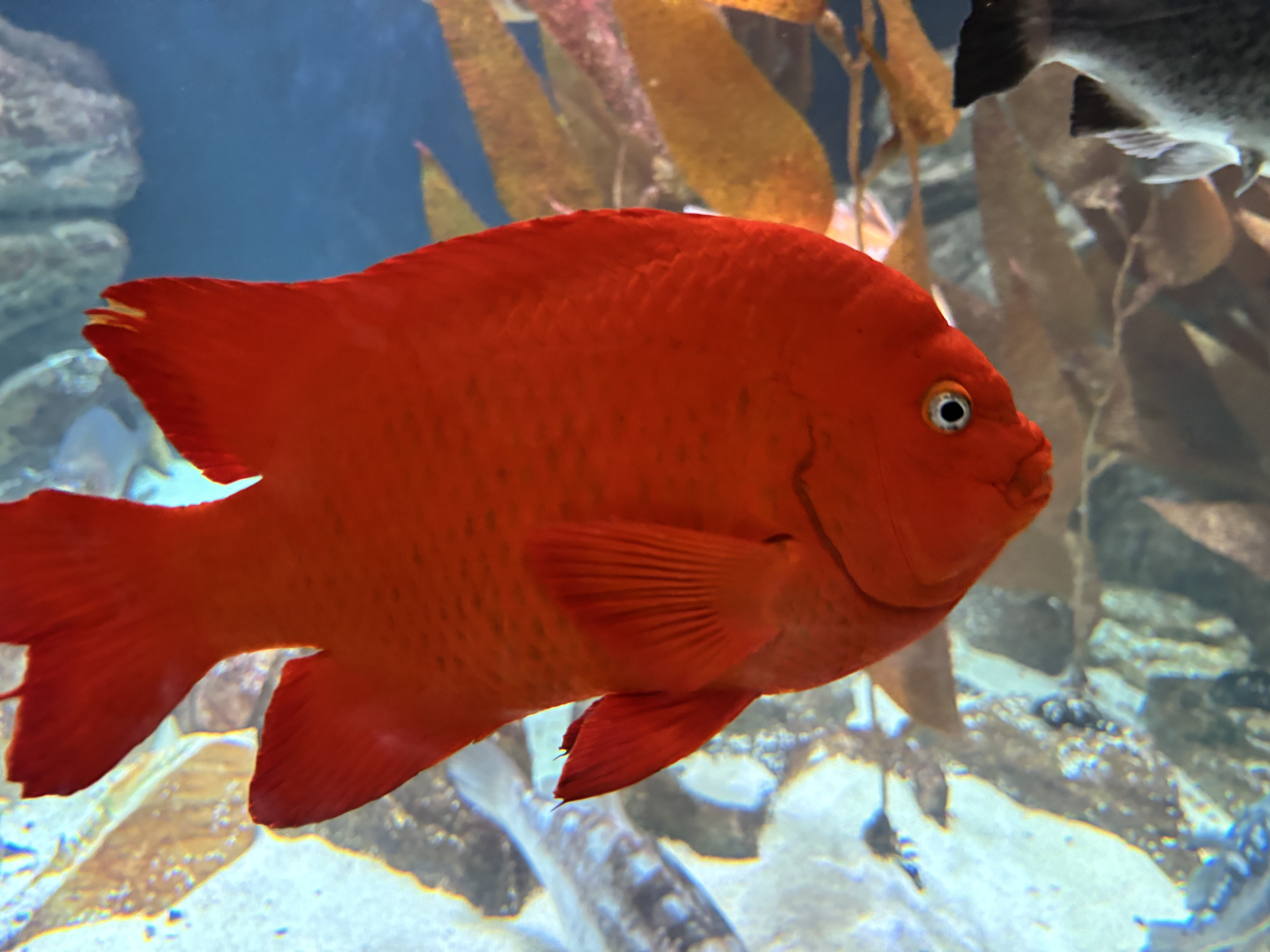
The Garibaldi is the state marine fish of California

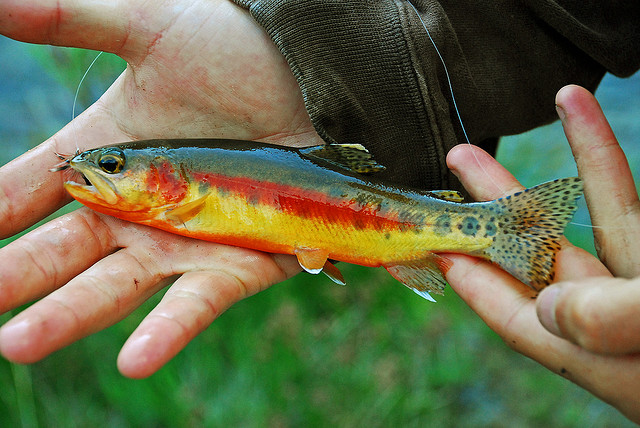
the Golden trout is the state freshwater fish of California

== Native Species ==
=== Class Myxini (Hagfishes) ===
==== Family Myxinidae (Hagfishes) ====
- Genus Eptatretus
  - Eptatretus stoutii (Pacific Hagfish)

=== Class Petromyzonti (Lampreys) ===
==== Family Petromyzontidae (Northern Lampreys) ====
- Genus Entosphenus
  - Entosphenus tridentatus (Pacific Lamprey)
  - Entosphenus folletti (Northern California Lamprey)
  - Entosphenus similis (Klamath Lamprey)
  - Entosphenus minimus (Pit-Klamath Brook Lamprey)
- Genus Lampetra
  - Lampetra ayresii (Western River Lamprey)
  - Lampetra hubbsi (Kern Brook Lamprey)
  - Lampetra pacifica (Coastal Brook Lamprey)
  - Lampetra richardsoni (Western Brook Lamprey)

=== Class Chondrichthyes (Cartilaginous Fishes) ===
==== Family Heterodontidae (Bullhead Sharks) ====
- Genus Heterodontus
  - Heterodontus francisci (Horn Shark)

==== Family Orectolobidae (Carpet Sharks) ====
- Genus Ginglymostoma
  - Ginglymostoma cirratum (Nurse Shark) — Rare vagrant

==== Family Rhincodontidae (Whale Sharks) ====
- Genus Rhincodon
  - Rhincodon typus (Whale Shark) — Rare seasonal visitor

==== Family Alopiidae (Thresher Sharks) ====
- Genus Alopias
  - Alopias pelagicus (Pelagic Thresher)
  - Alopias superciliosus (Bigeye Thresher)
  - Alopias vulpinus (Common Thresher)

==== Family Cetorhinidae (Basking Sharks) ====
- Genus Cetorhinus
  - Cetorhinus maximus (Basking Shark) — Seasonal visitor

==== Family Lamnidae (Mackerel Sharks) ====
- Genus Carcharodon
  - Carcharodon carcharias (Great White Shark)
- Genus Isurus
  - Isurus oxyrinchus (Shortfin Mako)
  - Isurus paucus (Longfin Mako) — Rare
- Genus Lamna
  - Lamna ditropis (Salmon Shark)

==== Family Hexanchidae (Cow Sharks) ====
- Genus Hexanchus
  - Hexanchus griseus (Bluntnose Sixgill Shark)
- Genus Notorynchus
  - Notorynchus cepedianus (Broadnose Sevengill Shark)

==== Family Echinorhinidae (Bramble Sharks) ====
- Genus Echinorhinus
  - Echinorhinus cookei (Prickly Shark)

==== Family Squalidae (Dogfish Sharks) ====
- Genus Squalus
  - Squalus suckleyi (Pacific Spiny Dogfish)

==== Family Somniosidae (Sleeper Sharks) ====
- Genus Somniosus
  - Somniosus pacificus (Pacific Sleeper Shark) — Deep water

==== Family Dalatiidae (Kitefin Sharks) ====
- Genus Isistius
  - Isistius brasiliensis (Cookiecutter Shark) — Rare offshore

==== Family Carcharhinidae (Requiem Sharks) ====
- Genus Carcharhinus
  - Carcharhinus brachyurus (Copper Shark)
  - Carcharhinus obscurus (Dusky Shark)
  - Carcharhinus plumbeus (Sandbar Shark)
  - Carcharhinus falciformis (Silky Shark)
  - Carcharhinus limbatus (Blacktip Shark) — Rare vagrant
  - Carcharhinus longimanus (Oceanic Whitetip Shark) — Rare offshore
- Genus Galeocerdo
  - Galeocerdo cuvier (Tiger Shark) — Rare vagrant
- Genus Negaprion
  - Negaprion brevirostris (Lemon Shark) — Rare vagrant
- Genus Prionace
  - Prionace glauca (Blue Shark)
- Genus Rhizoprionodon
  - Rhizoprionodon longurio (Pacific Sharpnose Shark)
- Genus Triaenodon
  - Triaenodon obesus (Whitetip Reef Shark) — Rare vagrant

==== Family Sphyrnidae (Hammerhead Sharks) ====
- Genus Sphyrna
  - Sphyrna corona (Scalloped Bonnethead)
  - Sphyrna lewini (Scalloped Hammerhead)
  - Sphyrna media (Scoophead)
  - Sphyrna mokarran (Great Hammerhead) — Rare vagrant
  - Sphyrna tiburo (Bonnethead) — Rare vagrant
  - Sphyrna zygaena (Smooth Hammerhead)

==== Family Triakidae (Houndsharks) ====
- Genus Galeorhinus
  - Galeorhinus galeus (Soupfin Shark)
- Genus Mustelus
  - Mustelus californicus (Grey Smoothhound)
  - Mustelus henlei (Brown Smoothhound)
  - Mustelus lunulatus (Sicklefin Smoothhound)
- Genus Triakis
  - Triakis semifasciata (Leopard Shark)

==== Family Torpedinidae (Electric Rays) ====
- Genus Tetronarce
  - Tetronarce californica (Pacific Electric Ray)

==== Family Rajidae (Skates) ====
- Genus Beringraja
  - Beringraja binoculata (Big Skate)
- Genus Raja
  - Raja inornata (California Skate)
  - Raja stellulata (Starry Skate)
- Genus Bathyraja
  - Bathyraja kincaidii (Sandpaper Skate)
  - Bathyraja trachura (Roughtail Skate)
- Genus Amblyraja
  - Amblyraja badia (Broad Skate) — Deep water

==== Family Arhynchobatidae (Softnose Skates) ====
- Genus Bathyraja
  - Bathyraja abyssicola (Deepsea Skate) — Deep water
- Genus Notoraja
  - Notoraja hesperindica (Western Indian Skate) — Deep water

==== Family Dasyatidae (Whiptail Stingrays) ====
- Genus Hypanus
  - Hypanus dipterurus (Diamond Stingray)
- Genus Pteroplatytrygon
  - Pteroplatytrygon violacea (Pelagic Stingray)
- Genus Urobatis
  - Urobatis halleri (Round Stingray)

==== Family Gymnuridae (Butterfly Rays) ====
- Genus Gymnura
  - Gymnura marmorata (California Butterfly Ray)

==== Family Myliobatidae (Eagle Rays) ====
- Genus Aetobatus
  - Aetobatus laticeps (Pacific White-Spotted Eagle Ray)
- Genus Myliobatis
  - Myliobatis californica (Bat Ray)
- Genus Rhinoptera
  - Rhinoptera steindachneri (Pacific Cownose Ray) — Rare vagrant

==== Family Mobulidae (Devilrays) ====
- Genus Mobula
  - Mobula birostris (Giant Manta Ray)
  - Mobula munkiana (Munk's Devil Ray)
  - Mobula thurstoni (Bentfin Devil Ray)

==== Family Chimaeridae (Shortnose Chimaeras) ====
- Genus Hydrolagus
  - Hydrolagus colliei (Spotted Ratfish)
  - Hydrolagus trolli (Pointy-nosed Blue Chimaera) — Deep water

=== Class Actinopterygii (Ray-Finned Fishes) ===
==== Family Acipenseridae (Sturgeons) ====
- Genus Acipenser
  - Acipenser medirostris (Green Sturgeon)
  - Acipenser transmontanus (White Sturgeon)

==== Family Polyodontidae (Paddlefishes) ====
- Genus Polyodon
  - Polyodon spathula (Paddlefish) — Extirpated

==== Family Clupeidae (Herrings, Shads, and Sardines) ====
- Genus Alosa
  - Alosa sapidissima (American Shad) — Anadromous; introduced from East Coast
- Genus Clupea
  - Clupea pallasii (Pacific Herring)
- Genus Dorosoma
  - Dorosoma petenense (Threadfin Shad) — Introduced
- Genus Sardinops
  - Sardinops sagax (Pacific Sardine)
- Genus Etrumeus
  - Etrumeus acuminatus (Pacific Round Herring)

==== Family Engraulidae (Anchovies) ====
- Genus Anchoa
  - Anchoa compressa (Deepbody Anchovy)
  - Anchoa delicatissima (Slough Anchovy)
  - Anchoa nasus (Longnose Anchovy)
- Genus Cetengraulis
  - Cetengraulis mysticetus (Pacific Anchoveta)
- Genus Engraulis
  - Engraulis mordax (Northern Anchovy)

==== Family Salmonidae (Salmon, Trout, Chars, and Whitefish) ====
- Genus Oncorhynchus
  - Oncorhynchus clarkii (Cutthroat Trout)
    - O. c. clarkii (Coastal Cutthroat Trout)
    - O. c. humboldtensis (Lahontan Cutthroat Trout) — Threatened
    - O. c. seleniris (Paiute Cutthroat Trout) — Threatened
  - Oncorhynchus gilae (Gila Trout) — Endangered; introduced to CA
  - Oncorhynchus gorbuscha (Pink Salmon) — Rare south of SF
  - Oncorhynchus keta (Chum Salmon) — Rare
  - Oncorhynchus kisutch (Coho Salmon) — Endangered (Central CA ESU)
  - Oncorhynchus mykiss (Rainbow Trout / Steelhead)
    - Anadromous: Steelhead (Multiple threatened/endangered ESUs)
    - Freshwater: Rainbow Trout (Includes many endemic forms)
  - Oncorhynchus nerka (Sockeye Salmon / Kokanee)
  - Oncorhynchus tshawytscha (Chinook Salmon) (Multiple threatened/endangered ESUs)
- Genus Salvelinus
  - Salvelinus confluentus (Bull Trout) — Extirpated?
  - Salvelinus fontinalis (Brook Trout) — Introduced
  - Salvelinus malma (Dolly Varden) — Rare in far north
- Genus Prosopium
  - Prosopium abyssicola (Bear Lake Whitefish) — Extirpated?
  - Prosopium gemmiferum (Bonneville Cisco) — Extirpated?
  - Prosopium spilonotus (Bonneville Whitefish) — Extirpated?
  - Prosopium williamsoni (Mountain Whitefish)
- Genus Coregonus
  - Coregonus clupeaformis (Lake Whitefish) — Extirpated?

==== Family Osmeridae (Smelts) ====
- Genus Hypomesus
  - Hypomesus nipponensis (Wakasagi) — Introduced
  - Hypomesus pretiosus (Surf Smelt)
  - Hypomesus transpacificus (Delta Smelt) — Endangered
- Genus Spirinchus
  - Spirinchus starksi (Night Smelt)
  - Spirinchus thaleichthys (Longfin Smelt) — Threatened
- Genus Thaleichthys
  - Thaleichthys pacificus (Eulachon) — Threatened

==== Family Galaxiidae (Galaxiids) ====
- Genus Galaxias
  - Galaxias maculatus (Inanga) — Introduced

==== Family Argentinidae (Argentines) ====
- Genus Argentina
  - Argentina sialis (Pacific Argentine)

==== Family Bathylagidae (Deep-sea Smelts) ====
- Genus Bathylagus
  - Bathylagus pacificus (Pacific Blacksmelt)
  - Bathylagus wesethi (Snubnose Blacksmelt)

==== Family Opisthoproctidae (Barreleyes) ====
- Genus Opisthoproctus
  - Opisthoproctus soleatus (Barreleye) — Deep water

==== Family Umbridae (Mudminnows) ====
- Genus Novumbra
  - Novumbra hubbsi (Olympic Mudminnow) — Extirpated? Questionable historical presence.

==== Family Esocidae (Pikes) ====
- Genus Esox
  - Esox lucius (Northern Pike) — Illegally introduced, eradicated from some waters

==== Family Cyprinidae (Carp) ====
- Genus Cyprinus
  - Cyprinus carpio (Common Carp) — Introduced

==== Family Leuciscidae (Shiners, Daces and Minnows) ====
- Genus Acrocheilus
  - Acrocheilus alutaceus (Chiselmouth) — Rare in CA
- Genus Clinostomus
  - Clinostomus funduloides (Rosyside Dace) — Extirpated?
- Genus Couesius
  - Couesius plumbeus (Lake Chub) — Extirpated?
- Genus Cyprinella
  - Cyprinella lutrensis (Red Shiner) — Introduced
- Genus Gila
  - Gila bicolor (Tui Chub)
    - G. b. bicolor (Tui Chub)
    - G. b. obesa (Owens Tui Chub) — Endangered
    - G. b. thalassinus (Goose Lake Tui Chub)
  - Gila coerulea (Blue Chub)
  - Gila crassicauda (Thicktail Chub) — Extinct
  - Gila elegans (Bonytail Chub) — Endangered; reintroduced
  - Gila orcuttii (Arroyo Chub)
  - Gila pandora (Rio Grande Chub) — Introduced?
  - Gila purpurea (Yaqui Chub) — Extirpated?
  - Gila robusta (Roundtail Chub)
- Genus Hesperoleucus
  - Hesperoleucus symmetricus (California Roach)
- Genus Lavinia
  - Lavinia exilicauda (Hitch)
- Genus Luxilus
  - Luxilus cornutus (Common Shiner) — Introduced
- Genus Mylopharodon
  - Mylopharodon conocephalus (Hardhead)
- Genus Nocomis
  - Nocomis biguttatus (Hornyhead Chub) — Introduced
- Genus Notemigonus
  - Notemigonus crysoleucas (Golden Shiner) — Introduced
- Genus Notropis
  - Notropis atherinoides (Emerald Shiner) — Introduced
  - Notropis stramineus (Sand Shiner) — Introduced
- Genus Oregonichthys
  - Oregonichthys crameri (Oregon Chub) — Extirpated?
- Genus Pimephales
  - Pimephales notatus (Bluntnose Minnow) — Introduced
  - Pimephales promelas (Fathead Minnow) — Introduced
- Genus Pogonichthys
  - Pogonichthys ciscoides (Clear Lake Splittail) — Extinct
  - Pogonichthys macrolepidotus (Sacramento Splittail) — Threatened
- Genus Ptychocheilus
  - Ptychocheilus grandis (Sacramento Pikeminnow)
  - Ptychocheilus lucius (Colorado Pikeminnow) — Extirpated? Endangered
- Genus Rhinichthys
  - Rhinichthys cataractae (Longnose Dace)
  - Rhinichthys deaconi (Las Vegas Dace) — Extinct
  - Rhinichthys evermanni (Umpqua Dace) — Rare in CA
  - Rhinichthys falcatus (Leopard Dace) — Rare in CA
  - Rhinichthys osculus (Speckled Dace)
    - R. o. kisutch (Smith River Speckled Dace)
    - R. o. nevadensis (Amargosa Speckled Dace)
    - R. o. oligoporus (Clover Valley Speckled Dace)
    - R. o. ssp. (Santa Ana Speckled Dace) — Endangered
    - R. o. ssp. (Owens Speckled Dace)
    - R. o. ssp. (Long Valley Speckled Dace) — Extinct?
- Genus Richardsonius
  - Richardsonius balteatus (Redside Shiner)
  - Richardsonius egregius (Lahontan Redside)
- Genus Siphateles
  - Siphateles bicolor (Tui Chub) — (Often included in Gila)
  - Siphateles mohavensis (Mohave Tui Chub) — Endangered
- Genus Tiaroga
  - Tiaroga cobitis (Loach Minnow) — Extirpated? Endangered

==== Family Catostomidae (Suckers) ====
- Genus Catostomus
  - Catostomus ardens (Utah Sucker)
  - Catostomus bernardini (Yaqui Sucker) — Extirpated?
  - Catostomus catostomus (Longnose Sucker) — Rare in CA
  - Catostomus discobolus (Bluehead Sucker) — Rare in CA
  - Catostomus fumeiventris (Owens Sucker)
  - Catostomus insignis (Sonora Sucker)
  - Catostomus latipinnis (Flannelmouth Sucker)
  - Catostomus microps (Modoc Sucker) — Threatened
  - Catostomus occidentalis (Sacramento Sucker)
  - Catostomus platyrhynchus (Mountain Sucker)
  - Catostomus rimiculus (Klamath Smallscale Sucker)
  - Catostomus santaanae (Santa Ana Sucker) — Threatened
  - Catostomus snyderi (Klamath Largescale Sucker)
  - Catostomus tahoensis (Tahoe Sucker)
  - Catostomus warnerensis (Warner Sucker) — Threatened
- Genus Chasmistes
  - Chasmistes brevirostris (Shortnose Sucker) — Endangered
  - Chasmistes cujus (Cui-ui) — Endangered; in Tahoe basin?
- Genus Deltistes
  - Deltistes luxatus (Lost River Sucker) — Endangered
- Genus Xyrauchen
  - Xyrauchen texanus (Razorback Sucker) — Endangered; reintroduced

==== Family Ictaluridae (North American Catfishes) ====
- Genus Ameiurus
  - Ameiurus melas (Black Bullhead) — Introduced
  - Ameiurus natalis (Yellow Bullhead) — Introduced
  - Ameiurus nebulosus (Brown Bullhead) — Native?/Introduced
- Genus Ictalurus
  - Ictalurus furcatus (Blue Catfish) — Introduced
  - Ictalurus pricei (Yaqui Catfish) — Extirpated? Endangered
  - Ictalurus punctatus (Channel Catfish) — Introduced
- Genus Noturus
  - Noturus flavus (Stonecat) — Extirpated?
- Genus Pylodictis
  - Pylodictis olivaris (Flathead Catfish) — Introduced

==== Family Aphredoderidae (Pirate Perches) ====
- Genus Aphredoderus
  - Aphredoderus sayanus (Pirate Perch) — Extirpated?

==== Family Amblyopsidae (Cavefishes) ====
- Genus Forbesichthys
  - Forbesichthys agassizii (Spring Cavefish) — Extirpated?

==== Family Bythitidae (Viviparous Brotulas) ====
- Genus Ogilbia
  - Ogilbia deroyi (Deroy's Brotula) — Rare, southern CA

==== Family Gadidae (Cods) ====
- Genus Eleginus
  - Eleginus gracilis (Saffron Cod) — Rare, far north
- Genus Gadus
  - Gadus macrocephalus (Pacific Cod)
- Genus Microgadus
  - Microgadus proximus (Pacific Tomcod)

==== Family Merlucciidae (Merluccid Hakes) ====
- Genus Merluccius
  - Merluccius productus (Pacific Hake)

==== Family Phycidae (Phycid Hakes) ====
- Genus Urophycis
  - Urophycis cirrata (Gulf Hake) — Rare, deep water

==== Family Lotidae (Hakes and Burbots) ====
- Genus Lota
  - Lota lota (Burbot) — Extirpated?

==== Family Ophidiidae (Cusk-eels) ====
- Genus Chilara
  - Chilara taylori (Spotted Cusk-eel)
- Genus Ophidion
  - Ophidion scrippsae (Basketweave Cusk-eel)
- Genus Otophidium
  - Otophidium scrippsi (Basketweave Cusk-eel)
  - Otophidium taylori (Spotted Cusk-eel)

==== Family Bythitidae (Viviparous Brotulas) ====
- Genus Ogilbia
  - Ogilbia deroyi (Deroy's Brotula) — Rare, southern CA

==== Family Batrachoididae (Toadfishes) ====
- Genus Porichthys
  - Porichthys myriaster (Specklefin Midshipman)
  - Porichthys notatus (Plainfin Midshipman)

==== Family Lophiidae (Goosefishes) ====
- Genus Lophius
  - Lophius budegassa (Blackbellied Angler) — Rare vagrant
  - Lophius piscatorius (Angler) — Rare vagrant

==== Family Antennariidae (Frogfishes) ====
- Genus Antennarius
  - Antennarius avalonis (Roughjaw Frogfish)
  - Antennarius sanguineus (Bloody Frogfish)

==== Family Ogcocephalidae (Batfishes) ====
- Genus Ogcocephalus
  - Ogcocephalus porrectus (Roughback Batfish) — Rare, southern CA

==== Family Mugilidae (Mullets) ====
- Genus Mugil
  - Mugil cephalus (Striped Mullet)
- Genus Planiliza
  - Planiliza haematocheila (So-iuy Mullet) — Introduced?

==== Family Atherinopsidae (New World Silversides) ====
- Genus Atherinops
  - Atherinops affinis (Topsmelt)
- Genus Atherinopsis
  - Atherinopsis californiensis (Jacksmelt)
- Genus Colpichthys
  - Colpichthys regis (False Jacksmelt)
- Genus Labidesthes
  - Labidesthes sicculus (Brook Silverside) — Introduced
- Genus Leuresthes
  - Leuresthes tenuis (California Grunion)
- Genus Menidia
  - Menidia audens (Mississippi Silverside) — Introduced

==== Family Belonidae (Needlefishes) ====
- Genus Platybelone
  - Platybelone argalus (Keeltail Needlefish) — Rare vagrant
- Genus Strongylura
  - Strongylura exilis (California Needlefish)
  - Strongylura marina (Atlantic Needlefish) — Rare vagrant
- Genus Tylosurus
  - Tylosurus pacificus (Pacific Agujon)

==== Family Hemiramphidae (Halfbeaks) ====
- Genus Hyporhamphus
  - Hyporhamphus rosae (California Halfbeak)
  - Hyporhamphus unifasciatus (Common Halfbeak) — Rare vagrant

==== Family Exocoetidae (Flyingfishes) ====
- Genus Cheilopogon
  - Cheilopogon furcatus (Spotfin Flyingfish)
  - Cheilopogon heterurus (Atlantic Flyingfish) — Rare vagrant
  - Cheilopogon pinnatibarbatus (Bennett's Flyingfish)
  - Cheilopogon suttoni (Sutton's Flyingfish)
- Genus Exocoetus
  - Exocoetus volitans (Tropical Two-wing Flyingfish) — Rare vagrant
- Genus Fodiator
  - Fodiator acutus (Sharpchin Flyingfish)
- Genus Hirundichthys
  - Hirundichthys rondeletii (Blackwing Flyingfish)
- Genus Oxyporhamphus
  - Oxyporhamphus micropterus (Smallwing Flyingfish)
- Genus Prognichthys
  - Prognichthys occidentalis (Bluntnose Flyingfish)
- Genus Cypselurus
  - Cypselurus comatus (Clearwing Flyingfish)
  - Cypselurus simus (Shortnose Flyingfish)

==== Family Adrianichthyidae (Ricefishes) ====
- Genus Oryzias
  - Oryzias latipes (Japanese Ricefish) — Introduced

==== Family Fundulidae (Topminnows) ====
- Genus Fundulus
  - Fundulus parvipinnis (California Killifish)
  - Fundulus sciadicus (Plains Topminnow) — Extirpated?

==== Family Profundulidae (Middle American Killifishes) ====
- Genus Profundulus
  - Profundulus punctatus (Oaxaca Killifish) — Extirpated?

==== Family Poeciliidae (Livebearers) ====
- Genus Gambusia
  - Gambusia affinis (Western Mosquitofish) — Introduced
  - Gambusia holbrooki (Eastern Mosquitofish) — Introduced
- Genus Poecilia
  - Poecilia latipinna (Sailfin Molly) — Introduced
  - Poecilia mexicana (Shortfin Molly) — Introduced
  - Poecilia reticulata (Guppy) — Introduced
- Genus Poeciliopsis
  - Poeciliopsis gracilis (Porthole Livebearer) — Introduced
  - Poeciliopsis occidentalis (Gila Topminnow) — Endangered; reintroduced
- Genus Xiphophorus
  - Xiphophorus hellerii (Green Swordtail) — Introduced
  - Xiphophorus maculatus (Southern Platyfish) — Introduced

==== Family Cyprinodontidae (Pupfishes) ====
- Genus Cyprinodon
  - Cyprinodon macularius (Desert Pupfish) — Endangered
  - Cyprinodon nevadensis (Amargosa Pupfish)
    - C. n. amargosae (Amargosa Pupfish)
    - C. n. calidae (Tecopa Pupfish) — Extinct
    - C. n. mionectes (Ash Meadows Pupfish)
    - C. n. nevadensis (Saratoga Springs Pupfish)
    - C. n. pectoralis (Warm Springs Pupfish)
    - C. n. shoshone (Shoshone Pupfish)
  - Cyprinodon radiosus (Owens Pupfish) — Endangered
  - Cyprinodon salinus (Death Valley Pupfish)
    - C. s. milleri (Cottonball Marsh Pupfish)
    - C. s. salinus (Salt Creek Pupfish)

==== Family Goodeidae (Splitfins) ====
- Genus Empetrichthys
  - Empetrichthys latos (Pahrump Poolfish) — Extinct in wild; reintroduced?
    - E. l. concavus (Bonneville Poolfish) — Extinct
    - E. l. latos (Pahrump Poolfish) — Extinct in wild
    - E. l. pahrump (Pahrump Poolfish)

==== Family Gasterosteidae (Sticklebacks) ====
- Genus Gasterosteus
  - Gasterosteus aculeatus (Threespine Stickleback)
- Genus Pungitius
  - Pungitius pungitius (Ninespine Stickleback) — Rare, far north

==== Family Syngnathidae (Pipefishes and Seahorses) ====
- Genus Hippocampus
  - Hippocampus ingens (Pacific Seahorse)
- Genus Syngnathus
  - Syngnathus auliscus (Barred Pipefish)
  - Syngnathus californiensis (Kelpipefish)
  - Syngnathus leptorhynchus (Bay Pipefish)
  - Syngnathus schlegeli (Seaweed Pipefish) — Rare vagrant

==== Family Scorpaenidae (Scorpionfishes) ====
- Genus Pontinus
  - Pontinus castor (Spotted Scorpionfish) — Deep water
  - Pontinus clemensi (Mottled Scorpionfish) — Deep water
- Genus Scorpaena
  - Scorpaena guttata (California Scorpionfish)
  - Scorpaena mystes (Pacific Spotted Scorpionfish)
  - Scorpaena plumieri (Plumed Scorpionfish) — Rare vagrant
- Genus Scorpaenodes
  - Scorpaenodes xyris (Dwarf Scorpionfish)
- Genus Sebastes (Rockfishes)
  - Sebastes atrovirens (Kelp Rockfish)
  - Sebastes auriculatus (Brown Rockfish)
  - Sebastes aurora (Aurora Rockfish)
  - Sebastes babcocki (Redbanded Rockfish)
  - Sebastes borealis (Shortraker Rockfish)
  - Sebastes brevispinis (Silvergray Rockfish)
  - Sebastes carnatus (Gopher Rockfish)
  - Sebastes caurinus (Copper Rockfish)
  - Sebastes chlorostictus (Greenspotted Rockfish)
  - Sebastes chrysomelas (Black-and-Yellow Rockfish)
  - Sebastes ciliatus (Dusky Rockfish)
  - Sebastes constellatus (Starry Rockfish)
  - Sebastes crameri (Darkblotched Rockfish)
  - Sebastes dallii (Calico Rockfish)
  - Sebastes diploproa (Splitnose Rockfish)
  - Sebastes elongatus (Greenstriped Rockfish)
  - Sebastes emphaeus (Puget Sound Rockfish)
  - Sebastes ensifer (Swordspine Rockfish)
  - Sebastes entomelas (Widow Rockfish)
  - Sebastes eos (Pink Rockfish)
  - Sebastes exsul (Buccaneer Rockfish)
  - Sebastes flammeus (Flame Rockfish)
  - Sebastes flavidus (Yellowtail Rockfish)
  - Sebastes gilli (Bronzespotted Rockfish)
  - Sebastes goodei (Chilipepper)
  - Sebastes helvomaculatus (Rosethorn Rockfish)
  - Sebastes hopkinsi (Squarespot Rockfish)
  - Sebastes jordani (Shortbelly Rockfish)
  - Sebastes lentiginosus (Freckled Rockfish)
  - Sebastes levis (Cowcod)
  - Sebastes maliger (Quillback Rockfish)
  - Sebastes melanops (Black Rockfish)
  - Sebastes melanostomus (Blackgill Rockfish)
  - Sebastes miniatus (Vermilion Rockfish)
  - Sebastes mystinus (Blue Rockfish)
  - Sebastes nebulosus (China Rockfish)
  - Sebastes nigrocinctus (Tiger Rockfish)
  - Sebastes notius (Guadalupe Rockfish)
  - Sebastes ovalis (Speckled Rockfish)
  - Sebastes paucispinis (Bocaccio)
  - Sebastes pinniger (Canary Rockfish)
  - Sebastes rastrelliger (Grass Rockfish)
  - Sebastes reedi (Yellowmouth Rockfish)
  - Sebastes rosaceus (Rosy Rockfish)
  - Sebastes rosenblatti (Greenblotched Rockfish)
  - Sebastes ruberrimus (Yelloweye Rockfish)
  - Sebastes rufus (Bank Rockfish)
  - Sebastes saxicola (Stripetail Rockfish)
  - Sebastes semicinctus (Halfbanded Rockfish)
  - Sebastes serranoides (Olive Rockfish)
  - Sebastes serriceps (Treefish)
  - Sebastes simulator (Pinkrose Rockfish)
  - Sebastes sinensis (Korean Rockfish) — Rare vagrant?
  - Sebastes umbrosus (Honeycomb Rockfish)
  - Sebastes variegatus (Harlequin Rockfish)
  - Sebastes varispinis (Whitespotted Rockfish)
  - Sebastes ventricosus (Japanese White Sebastes) — Rare vagrant?
  - Sebastes viviparus (Norway Redfish) — Rare vagrant?
  - Sebastes wilsoni (Pygmy Rockfish)
  - Sebastes zacentrus (Sharpchin Rockfish)

==== Family Sebastolobidae (Thornyheads) ====
- Genus Sebastolobus
  - Sebastolobus alascanus (Shortspine Thornyhead)
  - Sebastolobus altivelis (Longspine Thornyhead)

==== Family Anoplopomatidae (Sablefishes) ====
- Genus Anoplopoma
  - Anoplopoma fimbria (Sablefish)
- Genus Erilepis
  - Erilepis zonifer (Skilfish)

==== Family Hexagrammidae (Greenlings) ====
- Genus Hexagrammos
  - Hexagrammos decagrammus (Kelp Greenling)
  - Hexagrammos lagocephalus (Rock Greenling)
  - Hexagrammos octogrammus (Masked Greenling) — Rare, far north
  - Hexagrammos stelleri (Whitespotted Greenling) — Rare, far north
- Genus Ophiodon
  - Ophiodon elongatus (Lingcod)
- Genus Oxylebius
  - Oxylebius pictus (Painted Greenling)
- Genus Pleurogrammus
  - Pleurogrammus monopterygius (Atka Mackerel) — Rare, far north
- Genus Zaniolepis
  - Zaniolepis frenata (Shortspine Combfish)
  - Zaniolepis latipinnis (Longspine Combfish)

==== Family Cottidae (Sculpins) ====
- Genus Artedius
  - Artedius corallinus (Coralline Sculpin)
  - Artedius fenestralis (Padded Sculpin)
  - Artedius harringtoni (Scalyhead Sculpin)
  - Artedius lateralis (Smoothhead Sculpin)
  - Artedius notospilotus (Bonehead Sculpin)
- Genus Ascelichthys
  - Ascelichthys rhodorus (Rosylip Sculpin)
- Genus Blepsias
  - Blepsias cirrhosus (Silverspotted Sculpin)
- Genus Chitonotus
  - Chitonotus pugetensis (Roughback Sculpin)
- Genus Clinocottus
  - Clinocottus acuticeps (Sharpnose Sculpin)
  - Clinocottus analis (Woolly Sculpin)
  - Clinocottus embryum (Calico Sculpin)
  - Clinocottus globiceps (Mosshead Sculpin)
  - Clinocottus recalvus (Bald Sculpin)
- Genus Cottus
  - Cottus aleuticus (Coastrange Sculpin)
  - Cottus asper (Prickly Sculpin)
  - Cottus asperrimus (Rough Sculpin)
  - Cottus beldingii (Paiute Sculpin)
  - Cottus confusus (Shorthead Sculpin)
  - Cottus gulosus (Riffle Sculpin)
  - Cottus klamathensis (Marbled Sculpin)
  - Cottus perplexus (Reticulate Sculpin)
  - Cottus pitensis (Pit Sculpin)
  - Cottus princeps (Klamath Lake Sculpin)
  - Cottus tenuis (Slender Sculpin)
- Genus Enophrys
  - Enophrys bison (Buffalo Sculpin)
  - Enophrys taurina (Bull Sculpin)
- Genus Hemilepidotus
  - Hemilepidotus hemilepidotus (Red Irish Lord)
  - Hemilepidotus spinosus (Brown Irish Lord)
  - Hemilepidotus zapus (Longfin Irish Lord)
- Genus Icelinus
  - Icelinus burchami (Dusky Sculpin)
  - Icelinus cavifrons (Pit-head Sculpin)
  - Icelinus filamentosus (Threadfin Sculpin)
  - Icelinus fimbriatus (Fringed Sculpin)
  - Icelinus limbaughi (Yellowchin Sculpin)
  - Icelinus oculatus (Frogmouth Sculpin)
  - Icelinus quadriseriatus (Yellow-spotted Sculpin)
  - Icelinus tenuis (Spotfin Sculpin)
- Genus Jordania
  - Jordania zonope (Longfin Sculpin)
- Genus Leptocottus
  - Leptocottus armatus (Pacific Staghorn Sculpin)
- Genus Melletes
  - Melletes papilio (Butterfly Sculpin) — Rare, far north
- Genus Nautichthys
  - Nautichthys oculofasciatus (Sailfin Sculpin)
  - Nautichthys pribilovius (Eyeshade Sculpin) — Rare, far north
- Genus Oligocottus
  - Oligocottus maculosus (Tidepool Sculpin)
  - Oligocottus rimensis (Saddleback Sculpin)
  - Oligocottus rubellio (Rosy Sculpin)
  - Oligocottus snyderi (Fluffy Sculpin)
- Genus Orthonopias
  - Orthonopias triacis (Snubnose Sculpin)
- Genus Paricelinus
  - Paricelinus hopliticus (Thornback Sculpin)
- Genus Radulinus
  - Radulinus asprellus (Slim Sculpin)
  - Radulinus boleoides (Darter Sculpin)
  - Radulinus vinculus (Smoothgum Sculpin)
- Genus Rhamphocottus
  - Rhamphocottus richardsonii (Grunt Sculpin)
- Genus Scorpaenichthys
  - Scorpaenichthys marmoratus (Cabezon)
- Genus Synchirus
  - Synchirus gilli (Manacled Sculpin)
- Genus Triglops
  - Triglops forficatus (Scissortail Sculpin) — Rare, far north
  - Triglops macellus (Roughspine Sculpin) — Rare, far north
  - Triglops metopias (Freckled Sculpin) — Rare, far north
  - Triglops pingelii (Ribbed Sculpin) — Rare, far north
- Genus Zesticelus
  - Zesticelus profundorum (Flabby Sculpin) — Deep water

==== Family Psychrolutidae (Fatheads) ====
- Genus Psychrolutes
  - Psychrolutes phrictus (Blob Sculpin) — Deep water
- Genus Gilbertidia
  - Gilbertidia sigalutes (Knotty Sculpin) — Deep water

==== Family Agonidae (Poachers) ====
- Genus Agonopsis
  - Agonopsis sterletus (Southern Spearnose Poacher)
  - Agonopsis vulsa (Northern Spearnose Poacher)
- Genus Anoplagonus
  - Anoplagonus inermis (Smooth Alligatorfish) — Rare, far north
- Genus Bathyagonus
  - Bathyagonus nigripinnis (Blackfin Poacher)
  - Bathyagonus pentacanthus (Bigeye Poacher)
- Genus Bothragonus
  - Bothragonus swanii (Rockhead Poacher)
- Genus Chesnonia
  - Chesnonia verrucosa (Warty Poacher)
- Genus Hypsagonus
  - Hypsagonus quadricornis (Fourhorn Poacher) — Rare, far north
- Genus Leptagonus
  - Leptagonus frenatus (Sawback Poacher) — Rare, far north
- Genus Odontopyxis
  - Odontopyxis trispinosa (Pygmy Poacher)
- Genus Pallasina
  - Pallasina barbata (Tubenose Poacher)
- Genus Podothecus
  - Podothecus accipenserinus (Sturgeon Poacher)
  - Podothecus veternus (Dusky Poacher) — Rare, far north
- Genus Sarritor
  - Sarritor frenatus (Sawback Poacher) — Rare, far north
  - Sarritor leptorhynchus (Longnose Poacher)
- Genus Stellerina
  - Stellerina xyosterna (Pricklebreast Poacher)
- Genus Xeneretmus
  - Xeneretmus latifrons (Blacktip Poacher)
  - Xeneretmus leiops (Smootheye Poacher)
  - Xeneretmus ritteri (Stripetail Poacher)
  - Xeneretmus triacanthus (Bluespotted Poacher)

==== Family Cyclopteridae (Lumpfishes) ====
- Genus Aptocyclus
  - Aptocyclus ventricosus (Smooth Lumpfish) — Rare, far north
- Genus Cyclopteropsis
  - Cyclopteropsis inarmatus (Smooth Lumpfish) — Rare, far north
- Genus Eumicrotremus
  - Eumicrotremus orbis (Pacific Spiny Lumpsucker)

==== Family Liparidae (Snailfishes) ====
- Genus Acantholiparis
  - Acantholiparis opercularis (Spiny Snailfish) — Deep water
- Genus Careproctus
  - Careproctus cypselurus (Finned Snailfish) — Deep water
  - Careproctus melanurus (Blacktail Snailfish) — Deep water
  - Careproctus ovigerum (Abyssal Snailfish) — Deep water
  - Careproctus phasma (Ghost Snailfish) — Deep water
  - Careproctus rastrinus (Salmon Snailfish) — Deep water
  - Careproctus reinhardti (Longfin Snailfish) — Deep water
  - Careproctus satanicus (Satanic Snailfish) — Deep water
  - Careproctus scottae (Paddle Snailfish) — Deep water
  - Careproctus segaliensis (Segalen's Snailfish) — Deep water
  - Careproctus sinensis (Chinese Snailfish) — Deep water
  - Careproctus spectrum (Specter Snailfish) — Deep water
  - Careproctus trachysoma (Rough Snailfish) — Deep water
- Genus Elassodiscus
  - Elassodiscus tremebundus (Warty Snailfish) — Deep water
- Genus Liparis
  - Liparis cyclopus (Ribbon Snailfish)
  - Liparis dennyi (Marbled Snailfish)
  - Liparis fucensis (Slipskin Snailfish)
  - Liparis greeni (Lobefin Snailfish)
  - Liparis inquilinus (Inquiline Snailfish)
  - Liparis pulchellus (Showy Snailfish)
  - Liparis rutteri (Ringtail Snailfish)
  - Liparis tessellatus (Polka-dot Snailfish)
- Genus Nectoliparis
  - Nectoliparis pelagicus (Tadpole Snailfish) — Deep water
- Genus Paraliparis
  - Paraliparis albescens (Whitish Snailfish) — Deep water
  - Paraliparis cephalus (Headsnail Fish) — Deep water
  - Paraliparis dactylosus (Finger Snailfish) — Deep water
  - Paraliparis devriesi (Devries' Snailfish) — Deep water
  - Paraliparis holomelas (Midwater Snailfish) — Deep water
  - Paraliparis mento (Smoothlip Snailfish) — Deep water
  - Paraliparis rosaceus (Rosy Snailfish) — Deep water
  - Paraliparis ulochir (Smoothtooth Snailfish) — Deep water
- Genus Polypera
  - Polypera simushirae (Noble Snailfish) — Deep water
- Genus Rhodichthys
  - Rhodichthys regina (Regal Snailfish) — Deep water

==== Family Centropomidae (Snooks) ====
- Genus Centropomus
  - Centropomus medius (Blackfin Snook) — Rare vagrant
  - Centropomus nigrescens (Black Snook) — Rare vagrant
  - Centropomus robalito (Yellowfin Snook) — Rare vagrant
  - Centropomus unionensis (Union Snook) — Rare vagrant
  - Centropomus viridis (White Snook) — Rare vagrant

==== Family Moronidae (Temperate Basses) ====
- Genus Morone
  - Morone saxatilis (Striped Bass) — Anadromous; introduced from East Coast

==== Family Serranidae (Sea Basses) ====
- Genus Caulolatilus
  - Caulolatilus princeps (Ocean Whitefish)
- Genus Diplectrum
  - Diplectrum pacificum (Pacific Sand Perch)
- Genus Paralabrax
  - Paralabrax clathratus (Kelp Bass)
  - Paralabrax maculatofasciatus (Spotted Sand Bass)
  - Paralabrax nebulifer (Barred Sand Bass)
- Genus Pronotogrammus
  - Pronotogrammus multifasciatus (Threadfin Bass) — Deep water
- Genus Schultzea
  - Schultzea beta (School Bass) — Rare, southern CA
- Genus Serranus
  - Serranus phoebe (Tattler Bass) — Deep water

==== Family Priacanthidae (Bigeyes) ====
- Genus Priacanthus
  - Priacanthus alalaua (Hawaiian Bigeye) — Rare vagrant
  - Priacanthus meeki (Hawaiian Bigeye) — Rare vagrant

==== Family Apogonidae (Cardinalfishes) ====
- Genus Apogon
  - Apogon atricaudus (Belted Cardinalfish)
  - Apogon pacificus (Pacific Cardinalfish) — Rare, southern CA
- Genus Astrapogon
  - Astrapogon puncticulatus (Blackfin Cardinalfish) — Rare vagrant
- Genus Phaeoptyx
  - Phaeoptyx xenus (Sponge Cardinalfish) — Rare vagrant

==== Family Malacanthidae (Tilefishes) ====
- Genus Caulolatilus
  - Caulolatilus affinis (Bighead Tilefish) — Rare, southern CA
  - Caulolatilus hubbsi (Hubbs' Tilefish) — Rare, southern CA
  - Caulolatilus princeps (Ocean Whitefish)

==== Family Pomatomidae (Bluefishes) ====
- Genus Pomatomus
  - Pomatomus saltatrix (Bluefish) — Rare vagrant

==== Family Rachycentridae (Cobias) ====
- Genus Rachycentron
  - Rachycentron canadum (Cobia) — Rare vagrant

==== Family Echeneidae (Remoras) ====
- Genus Echeneis
  - Echeneis naucrates (Sharksucker)
- Genus Phtheirichthys
  - Phtheirichthys lineatus (Slender Suckerfish)
- Genus Remora
  - Remora australis (Whalesucker)
  - Remora brachyptera (Spearfish Remora)
  - Remora osteochir (Marlinsucker)
  - Remora remora (Common Remora)

==== Family Carangidae (Jacks) ====
- Genus Alectis
  - Alectis ciliaris (African Pompano) — Rare vagrant
- Genus Carangoides
  - Carangoides orthogrammus (Yellowspotted Trevally) — Rare vagrant
- Genus Caranx
  - Caranx caninus (Pacific Crevalle Jack)
  - Caranx crysos (Blue Runner) — Rare vagrant
  - Caranx hippos (Crevalle Jack) — Rare vagrant
  - Caranx lugubris (Black Jack) — Rare vagrant
  - Caranx melampygus (Bluefin Trevally)
  - Caranx sexfasciatus (Bigeye Trevally)
  - Caranx vinctus (Cocinero)
- Genus Chloroscombrus
  - Chloroscombrus orqueta (Pacific Bumper)
- Genus Decapterus
  - Decapterus muroadsi (Amberstripe Scad)
  - Decapterus scombrinus (Mackerel Scad)
- Genus Elagatis
  - Elagatis bipinnulata (Rainbow Runner) — Rare vagrant
- Genus Gnathanodon
  - Gnathanodon speciosus (Golden Trevally) — Rare vagrant
- Genus Naucrates
  - Naucrates ductor (Pilotfish)
- Genus Oligoplites
  - Oligoplites altus (Longjaw Leatherjacket) — Rare, southern CA
  - Oligoplites refulgens (Silver Leatherjacket) — Rare, southern CA
  - Oligoplites saurus (Leatherjacket) — Rare vagrant
- Genus Parona
  - Parona signata (Parona Leatherjacket) — Rare vagrant
- Genus Pseudocaranx
  - Pseudocaranx dentex (White Trevally) — Rare vagrant
- Genus Selar
  - Selar crumenophthalmus (Bigeye Scad) — Rare vagrant
- Genus Selene
  - Selene brevoortii (Pacific Moonfish)
  - Selene peruviana (Peruvian Moonfish) — Rare, southern CA
- Genus Seriola
  - Seriola dorsalis (California Yellowtail)
  - Seriola lalandi (Yellowtail Amberjack)
  - Seriola rivoliana (Longfin Yellowtail) — Rare vagrant
- Genus Trachurus
  - Trachurus symmetricus (Pacific Jack Mackerel)

==== Family Coryphaenidae (Dolphinfishes) ====
- Genus Coryphaena
  - Coryphaena equiselis (Pompano Dolphinfish)
  - Coryphaena hippurus (Common Dolphinfish)

==== Family Bramidae (Pomfrets) ====
- Genus Brama
  - Brama japonica (Pacific Pomfret)
- Genus Pterycombus
  - Pterycombus brama (Atlantic Fanfish) — Rare vagrant
- Genus Taractes
  - Taractes asper (Rough Pomfret) — Deep water
- Genus Xenobrama
  - Xenobrama microlepis (Feather Pomfret) — Deep water

==== Family Caristiidae (Manefishes) ====
- Genus Caristius
  - Caristius macropus (Bigmouth Manefish) — Deep water

==== Family Emmelichthyidae (Rovers) ====
- Genus Emmelichthys
  - Emmelichthys struhsakeri (Redbait) — Deep water
- Genus Plagiogeneion
  - Plagiogeneion macrolepis (Bigscale Rover) — Deep water

==== Family Lutjanidae (Snappers) ====
- Genus Hoplopagrus
  - Hoplopagrus guentherii (Pacific Dog Snapper) — Rare, southern CA
- Genus Lutjanus
  - Lutjanus argentiventris (Yellow Snapper) — Rare, southern CA
  - Lutjanus colorado (Colorado Snapper) — Rare, southern CA
  - Lutjanus guttatus (Spotted Rose Snapper) — Rare, southern CA
  - Lutjanus novemfasciatus (Pacific Dog Snapper) — Rare, southern CA
  - Lutjanus peru (Pacific Red Snapper) — Rare, southern CA
  - Lutjanus viridis (Blue-and-gold Snapper) — Rare vagrant
- Genus Ocyurus
  - Ocyurus chrysurus (Yellowtail Snapper) — Rare vagrant
- Genus Rhomboplites
  - Rhomboplites aurorubens (Vermilion Snapper) — Rare vagrant

==== Family Lobotidae (Tripletails) ====
- Genus Lobotes
  - Lobotes pacificus (Pacific Tripletail) — Rare vagrant

==== Family Gerreidae (Mojarras) ====
- Genus Diapterus
  - Diapterus peruvianus (Peruvian Mojarra) — Rare, southern CA
- Genus Eucinostomus
  - Eucinostomus argenteus (Silver Mojarra) — Rare, southern CA
  - Eucinostomus currani (Pacific Flagfin Mojarra) — Rare, southern CA
  - Eucinostomus dowii (Dow's Mojarra) — Rare, southern CA
  - Eucinostomus gracilis (Graceful Mojarra) — Rare, southern CA
  - Eucinostomus harengulus (Tidewater Mojarra) — Rare vagrant
- Genus Gerres
  - Gerres cinereus (Yellowfin Mojarra) — Rare vagrant
- Genus Pentaprion
  - Pentaprion longimanus (Longfin Mojarra) — Rare vagrant

==== Family Haemulidae (Grunts) ====
- Genus Anisotremus
  - Anisotremus davidsonii (Xantic Sargo)
  - Anisotremus interruptus (Interrupted Grunt) — Rare, southern CA
  - Anisotremus scapularis (Peruvian Grunt) — Rare, southern CA
  - Anisotremus taeniatus (Panama Grunt) — Rare, southern CA
- Genus Conodon
  - Conodon serrifer (Barred Grunt) — Rare, southern CA
- Genus Genyatremus
  - Genyatremus luteus (Burrito Grunt) — Rare, southern CA
- Genus Haemulon
  - Haemulon maculicauda (Spottail Grunt) — Rare, southern CA
  - Haemulon scudderii (Grey Grunt) — Rare, southern CA
  - Haemulon steindachneri (Chere-Chere Grunt) — Rare, southern CA
- Genus Orthopristis
  - Orthopristis chalceus (Bronze-striped Grunt) — Rare vagrant
  - Orthopristis reddingi (Ronald's Grunt) — Rare, southern CA
- Genus Xenichthys
  - Xenichthys xanti (Longfin Salema) — Rare, southern CA
- Genus Xenistius
  - Xenistius californiensis (California Salema)

==== Family Inermiidae (Bonnetmouths) ====
- Genus Emmelichthyops
  - Emmelichthyops atlanticus (Bonnetmouth) — Rare vagrant

==== Family Sparidae (Porgies) ====
- Genus Calamus
  - Calamus brachysomus (Pacific Porgy) — Rare, southern CA
- Genus Diplodus
  - Diplodus holbrookii (Spottail Seabream) — Rare vagrant
- Genus Lagodon
  - Lagodon rhomboides (Pinfish) — Rare vagrant
- Genus Archosargus
  - Archosargus probatocephalus (Sheepshead) — Rare vagrant

==== Family Sciaenidae (Drums and Croakers) ====
- Genus Atractoscion
  - Atractoscion nobilis (White Seabass)
- Genus Bairdiella
  - Bairdiella icistia (Roncador)
  - Bairdiella ronchus (Ground Croaker) — Rare vagrant
- Genus Cheilotrema
  - Cheilotrema saturnum (Black Croaker)
- Genus Cynoscion
  - Cynoscion albus (Whitefin Weakfish) — Rare, southern CA
  - Cynoscion nortoni (Hake Weakfish) — Rare, southern CA
  - Cynoscion orthonopterus (Bigtooth Weakfish) — Rare, southern CA
  - Cynoscion parvipinnis (Shortfin Corvina)
  - Cynoscion reticulatus (Reticulated Corvina) — Rare, southern CA
  - Cynoscion xanthulus (Orangemouth Weakfish)
- Genus Genyonemus
  - Genyonemus lineatus (White Croaker)
- Genus Isopisthus
  - Isopisthus remifer (Silver Croaker) — Rare vagrant
- Genus Larimus
  - Larimus acclivis (Steeplined Drum) — Rare, southern CA
  - Larimus argenteus (Silver Drum) — Rare, southern CA
  - Larimus effulgens (Shining Drum) — Rare, southern CA
  - Larimus pacificus (Pacific Drum)
- Genus Leiostomus
  - Leiostomus xanthurus (Spot) — Rare vagrant
- Genus Menticirrhus
  - Menticirrhus elongatus (Mexican Croaker)
  - Menticirrhus undulatus (California Corbina)
- Genus Micropogonias
  - Micropogonias altipinnis (Highfin Croaker) — Rare, southern CA
  - Micropogonias ectenes (Slender Croaker) — Rare, southern CA
  - Micropogonias megalops (Atlantic Croaker) — Rare vagrant
- Genus Nebris
  - Nebris occidentalis (Pacific Smoothtail Croaker) — Rare, southern CA
- Genus Ophioscion
  - Ophioscion scierus (Point-nosed Croaker) — Rare, southern CA
  - Ophioscion strabo (Squint-eyed Croaker) — Rare, southern CA
  - Ophioscion typicus (Point-nosed Croaker) — Rare, southern CA
- Genus Pareques
  - Pareques lanfeari (Lanfear's Croaker) — Rare vagrant
- Genus Plagioscion
  - Plagioscion squamosissimus (South American Silver Croaker) — Introduced?
- Genus Ronchus
  - Ronchus jordani (Longjaw Croaker) — Rare, southern CA
- Genus Seriphus
  - Seriphus politus (Queenfish)
- Genus Stellifer
  - Stellifer ericymba (Hollow Stardrum) — Rare, southern CA
  - Stellifer fuerthii (White Stardrum) — Rare, southern CA
  - Stellifer mancorensis (Mancora Stardrum) — Rare, southern CA
  - Stellifer melanocheir (Blackhand Stardrum) — Rare, southern CA
  - Stellifer minor (Minor Stardrum) — Rare, southern CA
  - Stellifer pizarroensis (Pizarro Stardrum) — Rare, southern CA
  - Stellifer zestocarus (Soft Stardrum) — Rare, southern CA
- Genus Umbrina
  - Umbrina bussingi (Bussing's Drum) — Rare, southern CA
  - Umbrina dorsalis (Longtail Drum) — Rare, southern CA
  - Umbrina galapagorum (Galapagos Drum) — Rare, southern CA
  - Umbrina imberbis (Bearded Umbrina) — Rare vagrant
  - Umbrina reedi (Chilean Croaker) — Rare, southern CA
  - Umbrina roncador (Yellowfin Croaker)
  - Umbrina steindachneri (Steindachner's Drum) — Rare, southern CA
  - Umbrina wintersteeni (Wintersteen's Drum) — Rare, southern CA
  - Umbrina xanti (Polla Drum) — Rare, southern CA

==== Family Mullidae (Goatfishes) ====
- Genus Mulloidichthys
  - Mulloidichthys dentatus (Mexican Goatfish) — Rare, southern CA
- Genus Parupeneus
  - Parupeneus cyclostomus (Gold-saddle Goatfish) — Rare vagrant
  - Parupeneus pleurostigma (Sidespot Goatfish) — Rare vagrant
  - Parupeneus porphyreus (Whitesaddle Goatfish) — Rare vagrant
- Genus Pseudupeneus
  - Pseudupeneus grandisquamis (Bigscale Goatfish) — Rare, southern CA

==== Family Pempheridae (Sweepers) ====
- Genus Pempheris
  - Pempheris schomburgkii (Glassy Sweeper) — Rare vagrant

==== Family Polyprionidae (Wreckfishes) ====
- Genus Stereolepis
  - Stereolepis gigas (Giant Sea Bass) — Critically endangered

==== Family Centracanthidae (Picarel porgies) ====
- Genus Spicara
  - Spicara australis (Southern Picarel) — Rare vagrant

==== Family Pomacentridae (Damselfishes) ====
- Genus Hypsypops
  - Hypsypops rubicundus (Garibaldi) — The California state marine fish
- Genus Chromis
  - Chromis alta (Olive-yellow Chromis) — Rare, southern CA
  - Chromis atrilobata (Scissortail Chromis) — Rare, southern CA
  - Chromis crusma (Valparaiso Chromis) — Rare vagrant
  - Chromis punctipinnis (Blacksmith)
- Genus Azurina
  - Azurina hirundo (Swallowtail Damselfish) — Rare, southern CA
- Genus Microspathodon
  - Microspathodon dorsalis (Giant Damselfish) — Rare, southern CA
- Genus Stegastes
  - Stegastes acapulcoensis (Acapulco Major) — Rare, southern CA
  - Stegastes flavilatus (Beaubrummel) — Rare, southern CA
  - Stegastes rectifraenum (Cortez Major) — Rare, southern CA
- Genus Abudefduf
  - Abudefduf troschelii (Panama Sergeant Major) — Rare, southern CA

==== Family Labridae (Wrasses) ====
- Genus Bodianus
  - Bodianus diplotaenia (Pacific Hogfish)
  - Bodianus eclancheri (Harlequin Wrasse) — Rare, southern CA
- Genus Decodon
  - Decodon melasma (Redbreast Wrasse) — Rare, deep water
- Genus Halichoeres
  - Halichoeres chierchiae (Wounded Wrasse) — Rare, southern CA
  - Halichoeres dispilus (Chameleon Wrasse)
  - Halichoeres melanotis (Earspot Wrasse) — Rare, southern CA
  - Halichoeres notospilus (Banded Wrasse) — Rare, southern CA
  - Halichoeres semicinctus (Rock Wrasse)
- Genus Oxyjulis
  - Oxyjulis californica (Senorita)
- Genus Semicossyphus
  - Semicossyphus pulcher (California Sheephead)
- Genus Thalassoma
  - Thalassoma grammaticum (Sunset Wrasse) — Rare, southern CA
  - Thalassoma lucasanum (Cortez Rainbow Wrasse) — Rare, southern CA

==== Family Scaridae (Parrotfishes) ====
- Genus Scarus
  - Scarus compressus (Azure Parrotfish) — Rare, southern CA
  - Scarus ghobban (Blue-barred Parrotfish) — Rare, southern CA
  - Scarus perrico (Bumphead Parrotfish) — Rare, southern CA
  - Scarus rubroviolaceus (Ember Parrotfish) — Rare, southern CA
- Genus Sparisoma
  - Sparisoma atomarium (Greenblotch Parrotfish) — Rare vagrant

==== Family Uranoscopidae (Stargazers) ====
- Genus Kathetostoma
  - Kathetostoma averruncus (Smooth Stargazer)
- Genus Uranoscopus
  - Uranoscopus cognatus (Whitemargin Stargazer) — Rare, southern CA

==== Family Trichonotidae (Sand divers) ====
- Genus Trichonotus
  - Trichonotus setiger (Spotted Sand-diver) — Rare vagrant

==== Family Creediidae (Sand burrowers) ====
- Genus Limnichthys
  - Limnichthys polyactis (Long-finned Sandburrower) — Rare vagrant

==== Family Leptoscopidae (Sandfishes) ====
- Genus Crapatalus
  - Crapatalus novaezelandiae (New Zealand Sandfish) — Rare vagrant

==== Family Trachinidae (Weeverfishes) ====
- Genus Trachinus
  - Trachinus armatus (Spotted Weever) — Rare vagrant

==== Family Chiasmodontidae (Swallowers) ====
- Genus Chiasmodon
  - Chiasmodon niger (Black Swallower) — Deep water
- Genus Kali
  - Kali indica (Indian Swallower) — Deep water
- Genus Pseudoscopelus
  - Pseudoscopelus altipinnis (Highfin Swallower) — Deep water
  - Pseudoscopelus scriptus (Scriptured Swallower) — Deep water

==== Family Trichodontidae (Sandfishes) ====
- Genus Arctoscopus
  - Arctoscopus japonicus (Japanese Sandfish) — Rare, far north
- Genus Trichodon
  - Trichodon trichodon (Pacific Sandfish)

==== Family Ammodytidae (Sand lances) ====
- Genus Ammodytes
  - Ammodytes hexapterus (Pacific Sand Lance)
- Genus Bleekeria
  - Bleekeria estuaria (Estuarine Sand Lance) — Rare vagrant
- Genus Hyperoplus
  - Hyperoplus lanceolatus (Greater Sand-eel) — Rare vagrant

==== Family Trachinoididae (Sand lances) ====
- Genus Oxymetopon
  - Oxymetopon compressus (Compressed Sand Lance) — Rare vagrant

==== Family Percophidae (Duckbill flatheads) ====
- Genus Bembrops
  - Bembrops gobioides (Goby-like Duckbill) — Deep water
- Genus Chrionema
  - Chrionema chlorotaenia (Greenbanded Duckbill) — Deep water

==== Family Blenniidae (Combtooth blennies) ====
- Genus Hypsoblennius
  - Hypsoblennius gentilis (Bay Blenny)
  - Hypsoblennius gilberti (Rockpool Blenny)
  - Hypsoblennius jenkinsi (Mussel Blenny)
  - Hypsoblennius sordidus (Largemouth Blenny) — Rare, southern CA
- Genus Atrosalarias
  - Atrosalarias fuscus (Dusky Blenny)

==== Family Tripterygiidae (Threefin blennies) ====
- Genus Axoclinus
  - Axoclinus cocoensis (Coco Threefin) — Rare, southern CA
  - Axoclinus lucillae (Lucille's Threefin) — Rare, southern CA
  - Axoclinus nigricaudus (Blacktail Threefin) — Rare, southern CA
- Genus Crocondigma
  - Crocondigma rubellicauda (Redtail Threefin) — Rare, southern CA
- Genus Enneanectes
  - Enneanectes carminalis (Carmine Threefin) — Rare, southern CA
  - Enneanectes reticulatus (Reticulate Threefin) — Rare, southern CA
- Genus Gilloblennius
  - Gilloblennius abditus (Hidden Threefin) — Rare, southern CA
- Genus Lepidonectes
  - Lepidonectes corallicola (Coral Threefin) — Rare, southern CA
- Genus Norfolkia
  - Norfolkia brachylepis (Scaleless Threefin) — Rare vagrant
- Genus Tripterygion
  - Tripterygion cunninghami (Cunningham's Threefin) — Rare, southern CA
  - Tripterygion delaisi (Black-faced Blenny) — Rare vagrant

==== Family Dactyloscopidae (Sand stargazers) ====
- Genus Dactylagnus
  - Dactylagnus mundus (Giant Sand Stargazer)
- Genus Dactyloscopus
  - Dactyloscopus amnis (Riverine Sand Stargazer) — Rare, southern CA
  - Dactyloscopus comptus (Ornate Sand Stargazer)
  - Dactyloscopus elongatus (Elongate Sand Stargazer)
  - Dactyloscopus foraminosus (Reticulate Sand Stargazer) — Rare, southern CA
  - Dactyloscopus heraldi (Herald's Sand Stargazer) — Rare, southern CA
  - Dactyloscopus lunaticus (Moonshine Stargazer) — Rare, southern CA
  - Dactyloscopus metoecus (Migrant Sand Stargazer) — Rare, southern CA
  - Dactyloscopus minutus (Minute Sand Stargazer) — Rare, southern CA
  - Dactyloscopus poeyi (Shortchin Stargazer) — Rare vagrant
  - Dactyloscopus tridigitatus (Sand Stargazer)
- Genus Gillellus
  - Gillellus arenicola (Sand Stargazer)
  - Gillellus greyae (Grey's Stargazer) — Rare vagrant
  - Gillellus healae (Heal's Stargazer) — Rare, southern CA
  - Gillellus semicinctus (Half-banded Stargazer)
  - Gillellus uranidea (Warty Stargazer) — Rare, southern CA
- Genus Heteristius
  - Heteristius cinctus (Banded Stargazer) — Rare, southern CA
- Genus Myxodagnus
  - Myxodagnus belone (Dagger Stargazer)
  - Myxodagnus opercularis (Duckbill Stargazer) — Rare, southern CA
- Genus Platygillellus
  - Platygillellus rubrocinctus (Redbanded Stargazer) — Rare, southern CA
- Genus Sindoscopus
  - Sindoscopus australis (Australian Stargazer) — Rare vagrant
- Genus Storrsia
  - Storrsia olsoni (Olson's Stargazer) — Rare, southern CA

==== Family Chaenopsidae (Pikeblennies, tube blennies) ====
- Genus Acanthemblemaria
  - Acanthemblemaria balanorum (Balan's Blenny) — Rare, southern CA
  - Acanthemblemaria crockeri (Crocker's Blenny)
  - Acanthemblemaria macrospilus (Barnacle Blenny)
  - Acanthemblemaria paula (Minute Blenny) — Rare, southern CA
- Genus Chaenopsis
  - Chaenopsis alepidota (Orangethroat Pikeblenny)
  - Chaenopsis coheni (Cohen's Pikeblenny) — Rare, southern CA
  - Chaenopsis limbaughi (Limbaugh's Pikeblenny) — Rare, southern CA
  - Chaenopsis roseola (Pink Pikeblenny) — Rare, southern CA
  - Chaenopsis schmitti (Schmitt's Pikeblenny) — Rare, southern CA
- Genus Coralliozetus
  - Coralliozetus angelicus (Angel Blenny)
  - Coralliozetus boehlkei (Boehlke's Blenny) — Rare, southern CA
  - Coralliozetus cardonae (Cardona's Blenny) — Rare, southern CA
  - Coralliozetus micropes (Smallfoot Blenny) — Rare, southern CA
  - Coralliozetus rosenblatti (Rosenblatt's Blenny)
- Genus Ekemblemaria
  - Ekemblemaria myersi (Myers' Blenny) — Rare, southern CA
- Genus Emblemaria
  - Emblemaria biocellata (Twinspot Blenny) — Rare, southern CA
  - Emblemaria caycedoi (Caycedo's Blenny) — Rare, southern CA
  - Emblemaria culmenis (Ridge Blenny) — Rare, southern CA
  - Emblemaria hypacanthus (High-spined Blenny)
  - Emblemaria nivipes (Snowfoot Blenny) — Rare, southern CA
  - Emblemaria pandionis (Sailfin Blenny)
  - Emblemaria piratula (Pirate Blenny) — Rare, southern CA
  - Emblemaria walkeri (Walker's Blenny)
- Genus Hemiemblemaria
  - Hemiemblemaria simulus (Wrasse Blenny) — Rare, southern CA
- Genus Labrisomus
  - Labrisomus conditus (Hidden Blenny) — Rare, southern CA
  - Labrisomus dendriticus (Branched Blenny)
  - Labrisomus multiporosus (Pored Blenny) — Rare, southern CA
  - Labrisomus nigricinctus (Spotcheek Blenny) — Rare, southern CA
  - Labrisomus philippii (Chalapo Blenny) — Rare, southern CA
  - Labrisomus striatus (Green Blenny) — Rare, southern CA
  - Labrisomus wigginsi (Wiggins' Blenny) — Rare, southern CA
  - Labrisomus xanti (Largemouth Blenny)
- Genus Malacoctenus
  - Malacoctenus africanus (African Blenny) — Rare vagrant
  - Malacoctenus aurolineatus (Goldline Blenny)
  - Malacoctenus boehlkei (Diamond Blenny)
  - Malacoctenus costaricanus (Costa Rican Blenny) — Rare, southern CA
  - Malacoctenus delalandii (Redside Blenny) — Rare vagrant
  - Malacoctenus ebisui (Ebisui's Blenny) — Rare, southern CA
  - Malacoctenus gigas (Sonora Blenny)
  - Malacoctenus hubbsi (Hubbs' Blenny)
  - Malacoctenus macropus (Rosy Blenny)
  - Malacoctenus margaritae (Malpelo Blenny) — Rare, southern CA
  - Malacoctenus mexicanus (Mexican Blenny) — Rare, southern CA
  - Malacoctenus polyporosus (Pored Blenny) — Rare, southern CA
  - Malacoctenus sudensis (Sudan Blenny) — Rare vagrant
  - Malacoctenus tetranemus (Threethread Blenny) — Rare, southern CA
  - Malacoctenus triangulatus (Triangular Blenny)
  - Malacoctenus versicolor (Barfin Blenny) — Rare, southern CA
  - Malacoctenus zacae (Zaca's Blenny)
- Genus Nemaclinus
  - Nemaclinus atelestos (Threadfin Blenny) — Rare, southern CA
- Genus Paraclinus
  - Paraclinus altivelis (Highfin Blenny) — Rare, southern CA
  - Paraclinus arcanus (Mysterious Blenny) — Rare, southern CA
  - Paraclinus beebei (Beebe's Blenny) — Rare, southern CA
  - Paraclinus cingulatus (Banded Blenny) — Rare, southern CA
  - Paraclinus ditrichus (Doublestripe Blenny) — Rare, southern CA
  - Paraclinus fasciatus (Banded Blenny)
  - Paraclinus grandicomis (Horned Blenny) — Rare, southern CA
  - Paraclinus infrons (Bald Blenny) — Rare, southern CA
  - Paraclinus integripinnis (Redeye Blenny)
  - Paraclinus magdalenae (Magdalena Blenny) — Rare, southern CA
  - Paraclinus marmoratus (Marbled Blenny) — Rare, southern CA
  - Paraclinus monophthalmus (One-eyed Blenny) — Rare, southern CA
  - Paraclinus naeorhegmis (Swimming Blenny) — Rare, southern CA
  - Paraclinus nigripinnis (Blackfin Blenny)
  - Paraclinus sini (Blue-banded Blenny)
  - Paraclinus stephensi (Stephens' Blenny) — Rare, southern CA
  - Paraclinus tanygnathus (Longjaw Blenny) — Rare, southern CA
  - Paraclinus walkeri (Walker's Blenny) — Rare, southern CA
- Genus Starksia
  - Starksia brasiliensis (Brazilian Blenny) — Rare vagrant
  - Starksia cremnobates (Cremnobates Blenny) — Rare, southern CA
  - Starksia elongata (Elongate Blenny) — Rare, southern CA
  - Starksia fasciata (Banded Blenny) — Rare, southern CA
  - Starksia grammilaga (Line-spot Blenny) — Rare, southern CA
  - Starksia guttata (Spotted Blenny) — Rare, southern CA
  - Starksia hassi (Hass's Blenny) — Rare, southern CA
  - Starksia hoesei (Hoese's Blenny) — Rare, southern CA
  - Starksia lepicoelia (Scaly-fin Blenny) — Rare, southern CA
  - Starksia leucovitta (White-band Blenny) — Rare, southern CA
  - Starksia melasma (Black-spot Blenny) — Rare, southern CA
  - Starksia multilepis (Many-scaled Blenny) — Rare, southern CA
  - Starksia nanodes (Dwarf Blenny) — Rare, southern CA
  - Starksia occidentalis (Western Blenny) — Rare, southern CA
  - Starksia ocellata (Checkered Blenny)
  - Starksia posthon (False-posthon Blenny) — Rare, southern CA
  - Starksia rava (Tawny Blenny) — Rare, southern CA
  - Starksia ringleri (Ringler's Blenny) — Rare, southern CA
  - Starksia sluiteri (Sluiter's Blenny) — Rare, southern CA
  - Starksia spinipenis (Spiny-penis Blenny) — Rare, southern CA
  - Starksia splendens (Splendid Blenny) — Rare, southern CA
  - Starksia starcki (Starck's Blenny) — Rare, southern CA
  - Starksia variabilis (Variable Blenny) — Rare, southern CA
  - Starksia weigti (Weigt's Blenny) — Rare, southern CA
  - Starksia y-lineata (Y-lined Blenny) — Rare, southern CA
- Genus Xenomedea
  - Xenomedea rhodopyga (Red-rumped Blenny) — Rare, southern CA

==== Family Clinidae (Kelpfishes) ====
- Genus Gibbonsia
  - Gibbonsia elegans (Spotted Kelpfish)
  - Gibbonsia evides (Threaded Kelpfish) — Rare, southern CA
  - Gibbonsia metzi (Striped Kelpfish)
  - Gibbonsia montereyensis (Crevice Kelpfish)
- Genus Heterostichus
  - Heterostichus rostratus (Giant Kelpfish)
- Genus Myxodes
  - Myxodes ornatus (Ornate Kelpfish) — Rare, southern CA
  - Myxodes viridis (Green Kelpfish) — Rare, southern CA
- Genus Ophiclinops
  - Ophiclinops hutchinsi (Hutchins' Kelpfish) — Rare vagrant
- Genus Paraclinus
  - Paraclinus integripinnis (Redeye Kelpfish) — Rare, southern CA
- Genus Ribeiroclinus
  - Ribeiroclinus eigenmanni (Eigenmann's Kelpfish) — Rare vagrant

==== Family Labrisomidae (Labrisomid blennies) ====
- Genus Alloclinus
  - Alloclinus holderi (Island Kelpfish)
- Genus Cryptotrema
  - Cryptotrema corallinum (Deepwater Blenny) — Deep water
- Genus Exerpes
  - Exerpes asper (Sargassum Blenny)
- Genus Haptoclinus
  - Haptoclinus dropi (Four-fin Blenny) — Deep water
- Genus Nemaclinus
  - Nemaclinus atelestos (Threadfin Blenny) — Rare, southern CA
- Genus Stathmonotus
  - Stathmonotus hemphilli (Hemphill's Blenny) — Rare, southern CA
  - Stathmonotus sinuscalifornici (Gulf Blenny) — Rare, southern CA
  - Stathmonotus stahli (Eelgrass Blenny) — Rare, southern CA

==== Family Gobiesocidae (Clingfishes) ====
- Genus Acyrtops
  - Acyrtops beryllinus (Emerald Clingfish) — Rare vagrant
- Genus Acyrtus
  - Acyrtus artius (Red Clingfish) — Rare, southern CA
  - Acyrtus rubiginosus (Red Clingfish)
- Genus Arcos
  - Arcos erythrops (Red-eye Clingfish)
  - Arcos macrophthalmus (Bigeye Clingfish)
  - Arcos poecilophthalmos (Peppered Clingfish) — Rare, southern CA
  - Arcos rhodospilus (Red-spotted Clingfish)
- Genus Derilissus
  - Derilissus altifrons (Highbrow Clingfish) — Deep water
  - Derilissus lombardii (Lombardi's Clingfish) — Deep water
  - Derilissus nanus (Dwarf Clingfish) — Deep water
  - Derilissus vittiger (Banded Clingfish) — Deep water
- Genus Gobiesox
  - Gobiesox adustus (California Clingfish)
  - Gobiesox daedaleus (Checkerboard Clingfish) — Rare, southern CA
  - Gobiesox eugrammus (Lined Clingfish)
  - Gobiesox fluviatilis (River Clingfish) — Rare, southern CA
  - Gobiesox juniperoserrai (San Quintin Clingfish) — Rare, southern CA
  - Gobiesox lucayanus (Smooth Clingfish) — Rare vagrant
  - Gobiesox maeandricus (Northern Clingfish)
  - Gobiesox marijeanae (María's Clingfish) — Rare, southern CA
  - Gobiesox marmoratus (Marbled Clingfish)
  - Gobiesox milleri (Miller's Clingfish) — Rare, southern CA
  - Gobiesox multitentaculus (Many-tentacled Clingfish) — Rare, southern CA
  - Gobiesox nigripinnis (Blackfin Clingfish) — Rare, southern CA
  - Gobiesox papillifer (Roughback Clingfish)
  - Gobiesox pinniger (Topsail Clingfish)
  - Gobiesox potamius (River Clingfish) — Rare, southern CA
  - Gobiesox punctulatus (Stippled Clingfish) — Rare, southern CA
  - Gobiesox rhessodon (California Clingfish)
  - Gobiesox schultzi (Schultz's Clingfish) — Rare, southern CA
  - Gobiesox stenocephalus (Narrowhead Clingfish) — Rare, southern CA
  - Gobiesox woodsi (Woods' Clingfish) — Rare, southern CA
- Genus Rimicola
  - Rimicola cabrilloi (Cabrillo Clingfish)
  - Rimicola dimorpha (Southern Clingfish) — Rare, southern CA
  - Rimicola eigenmanni (Slender Clingfish)
  - Rimicola muscarum (Kelp Clingfish)
  - Rimicola sila (Northern Clingfish)
- Genus Tomicodon
  - Tomicodon abuelorum (Grandparents' Clingfish) — Rare, southern CA
  - Tomicodon australis (Southern Clingfish) — Rare, southern CA
  - Tomicodon bidens (Two-tooth Clingfish) — Rare, southern CA
  - Tomicodon boehlkei (Boehlke's Clingfish) — Rare, southern CA
  - Tomicodon briggsi (Briggs' Clingfish) — Rare, southern CA
  - Tomicodon chilensis (Chilean Clingfish) — Rare vagrant
  - Tomicodon clarkei (Clark's Clingfish) — Rare, southern CA
  - Tomicodon eos (Dawn Clingfish) — Rare, southern CA
  - Tomicodon fasciatus (Banded Clingfish)
  - Tomicodon humeralis (Sonora Clingfish) — Rare, southern CA
  - Tomicodon lavettsmithi (Lavett Smith's Clingfish) — Rare, southern CA
  - Tomicodon leurodiscus (Smooth disc Clingfish) — Rare, southern CA
  - Tomicodon myersi (Myers' Clingfish) — Rare, southern CA
  - Tomicodon petersii (Peters' Clingfish)
  - Tomicodon prodomus (Baja Clingfish) — Rare, southern CA
  - Tomicodon reitzae (Reitz's Clingfish) — Rare, southern CA
  - Tomicodon rhabdotus (Barred Clingfish) — Rare, southern CA
  - Tomicodon rupestris (Rock Clingfish) — Rare, southern CA
  - Tomicodon vermiculatus (Vermiculated Clingfish) — Rare, southern CA
  - Tomicodon zebra (Zebra Clingfish)

==== Family Callionymidae (Dragonets) ====
- Genus Callionymus
  - Callionymus californiensis (California Dragonet)
  - Callionymus enneactis (Mosaic Dragonet) — Rare, southern CA
  - Callionymus goodladi (Goodlad's Dragonet) — Rare vagrant
  - Callionymus superbus (Superb Dragonet) — Rare, southern CA
- Genus Foetorepus
  - Foetorepus agassizii (Spotted Dragonet) — Rare, southern CA
  - Foetorepus calauropomus (Bigeye Dragonet) — Rare, southern CA
  - Foetorepus goodenbeani (Goodbean's Dragonet) — Rare, southern CA
  - Foetorepus phasis (Ocellated Dragonet) — Rare, southern CA
- Genus Synchiropus
  - Synchiropus atrilabiatus (Blacklip Dragonet) — Rare, southern CA
  - Synchiropus delandi (Deland's Dragonet) — Rare, southern CA
  - Synchiropus laddi (Ladd's Dragonet) — Rare, southern CA
  - Synchiropus lateralis (Red Dragonet) — Rare, southern CA
  - Synchiropus morrisoni (Morrison's Dragonet) — Rare, southern CA
  - Synchiropus ocellatus (Ocellated Dragonet) — Rare, southern CA
  - Synchiropus occidentalis (Western Dragonet) — Rare, southern CA
  - Synchiropus phaeton (Phaeton Dragonet) — Rare, southern CA
  - Synchiropus splendidus (Mandarinfish) — Rare vagrant
  - Synchiropus stellatus (Stellate Dragonet) — Rare, southern CA
  - Synchiropus sycorax (Teira Batfish) — Rare vagrant

==== Family Eleotridae (Sleepers) ====
- Genus Dormitator
  - Dormitator latifrons (Pacific Fat Sleeper) — Rare, southern CA
- Genus Eleotris
  - Eleotris picta (Spotted Sleeper) — Rare, southern CA
- Genus Guavina
  - Guavina guavina (Guavina) — Rare vagrant
- Genus Gobiomorus
  - Gobiomorus dormitor (Bigmouth Sleeper) — Rare vagrant
- Genus Hypseleotris
  - Hypseleotris compressa (Empire Gudgeon) — Rare vagrant

==== Family Gobiidae (Gobies) ====
- Genus Acanthogobius
  - Acanthogobius flavimanus (Yellowfin Goby) — Introduced
- Genus Aruma
  - Aruma histrio (Marbled Goby)
- Genus Barbulifer
  - Barbulifer antennatus (Streamer Goby) — Rare, southern CA
  - Barbulifer ceuthoecus (Bearded Goby) — Rare, southern CA
  - Barbulifer enigmaticus (Enigmatic Goby) — Rare, southern CA
- Genus Bollmannia
  - Bollmannia communis (Rough-cheek Goby) — Rare, southern CA
  - Bollmannia stigmatura (Tailspot Goby) — Rare, southern CA
- Genus Clevelandia
  - Clevelandia ios (Arrow Goby)
- Genus Coryphopterus
  - Coryphopterus alloides (Barcheek Goby) — Rare, southern CA
  - Coryphopterus dicrus (Colon Goby) — Rare, southern CA
  - Coryphopterus glaucofraenum (Bridled Goby) — Rare vagrant
  - Coryphopterus hyalinus (Glass Goby) — Rare, southern CA
  - Coryphopterus lipernes (Peppered Goby) — Rare vagrant
  - Coryphopterus thrix (Bartail Goby) — Rare, southern CA
  - Coryphopterus tortugae (Tortuga Goby) — Rare vagrant
  - Coryphopterus venezuelae (Venezuela Goby) — Rare vagrant
- Genus Enigmapercis
  - Enigmapercis acutirostris (Sharpnose Goby) — Rare, southern CA
- Genus Eucyclogobius
  - Eucyclogobius newberryi (Tidewater Goby) — Endangered
- Genus Evermannichthys
  - Evermannichthys metzelaari (Sponge Goby) — Rare vagrant
- Genus Gillichthys
  - Gillichthys detrusus (Delta Goby) — Rare
  - Gillichthys mirabilis (Longjaw Mudsucker)
  - Gillichthys seta (Shortjaw Mudsucker)
- Genus Gnatholepis
  - Gnatholepis cauerensis (Goldspot Goby) — Rare vagrant
- Genus Gobiesox (Also in Gobiesocidae)
- Genus Gobioides
  - Gobioides broussonnetii (Violet Goby) — Rare vagrant
- Genus Gobionellus
  - Gobionellus microdon (Dwarf Goby) — Rare, southern CA
  - Gobionellus occidentalis (Western Goby) — Rare, southern CA
  - Gobionellus saepepallens (Dusky Goby) — Rare, southern CA
- Genus Gobiosoma
  - Gobiosoma chiquita (Least Goby) — Rare, southern CA
  - Gobiosoma hemigymnum (Half-naked Goby) — Rare, southern CA
  - Gobiosoma hildebrandi (Hildebrand's Goby) — Rare, southern CA
  - Gobiosoma longipala (Long-finned Goby) — Rare, southern CA
  - Gobiosoma nudum (Naked Goby) — Rare, southern CA
  - Gobiosoma paradoxum (Paradox Goby) — Rare, southern CA
  - Gobiosoma robustum (Robust Goby)
  - Gobiosoma spilotum (Spotted Goby) — Rare, southern CA
- Genus Ilypnus
  - Ilypnus gilberti (Cheekspot Goby)
  - Ilypnus luculentus (Minute Goby) — Rare, southern CA
- Genus Lepidogobius
  - Lepidogobius lepidus (Bay Goby)
- Genus Leucopsarion
  - Leucopsarion petersii (Ice Goby) — Rare vagrant
- Genus Lophogobius
  - Lophogobius cyprinoides (Crested Goby) — Rare vagrant
- Genus Lythrypnus
  - Lythrypnus alphigena (Whitetentacle Goby) — Rare, southern CA
  - Lythrypnus brasiliensis (Brazilian Goby) — Rare vagrant
  - Lythrypnus cobalus (Blue Goby) — Rare, southern CA
  - Lythrypnus dalli (Bluebanded Goby)
  - Lythrypnus elasson (Dwarf Goby) — Rare, southern CA
  - Lythrypnus gilberti (Gilbert's Goby) — Rare, southern CA
  - Lythrypnus heterochroma (Dwarf Goby) — Rare, southern CA
  - Lythrypnus insularis (Island Goby) — Rare, southern CA
  - Lythrypnus lavenbergi (Lavenberg's Goby) — Rare, southern CA
  - Lythrypnus minimus (Minute Goby) — Rare, southern CA
  - Lythrypnus montereyensis (Monterey Goby) — Rare, southern CA
  - Lythrypnus nesiotes (Island Goby) — Rare, southern CA
  - Lythrypnus okapia (Okapi Goby) — Rare, southern CA
  - Lythrypnus phorellus (Bald Goby) — Rare, southern CA
  - Lythrypnus pulchellus (Pretty Goby) — Rare, southern CA
  - Lythrypnus rhizophora (Mangrove Goby) — Rare vagrant
  - Lythrypnus solanensis (Solan Goby) — Rare vagrant
  - Lythrypnus spilus (Blue Goby) — Rare, southern CA
  - Lythrypnus zebra (Zebra Goby)
- Genus Macrodon
  - Macrodon mordax (Bigtooth Goby) — Rare, southern CA
- Genus Microgobius
  - Microgobius carri (Seminole Goby) — Rare vagrant
  - Microgobius curtus (Palemouth Goby) — Rare, southern CA
  - Microgobius cyclolepis (Circle-scale Goby) — Rare, southern CA
  - Microgobius emblematicus (Emblem Goby) — Rare, southern CA
  - Microgobius gulosus (Clown Goby)
  - Microgobius meeki (Meek's Goby) — Rare, southern CA
  - Microgobius microlepis (Smallscale Goby) — Rare, southern CA
  - Microgobius miraflorensis (Miraflores Goby) — Rare, southern CA
  - Microgobius signatus (Signal Goby) — Rare, southern CA
  - Microgobius tabogensis (Taboga Goby) — Rare, southern CA
  - Microgobius thalassinus (Green Goby) — Rare, southern CA
- Genus Mistichthys
  - Mistichthys luzonensis (Sinamar Goby) — Rare vagrant
- Genus Oligolepis
  - Oligolepis acutipennis (Sharptail Goby) — Rare, southern CA
- Genus Hazeus
  - Hazeus nephodes (Cloudy Goby) — Rare, southern CA
- Genus Palatogobius
  - Palatogobius grandoculus (Bigeye Goby) — Rare, southern CA
- Genus Parrella
  - Parrella fusca (Dusky Goby) — Rare, southern CA
  - Parrella ginsburgi (Ginsburg's Goby) — Rare, southern CA
  - Parrella macropteryx (Longfin Goby) — Rare, southern CA
  - Parrella maxillaris (Bigmouth Goby) — Rare, southern CA
  - Parrella lucretiae (Lucretia's Goby)
- Genus Pleurosicya
  - Pleurosicya boldinghi (Boldings' Goby) — Rare vagrant
- Genus Psilotris
  - Psilotris alepis (Scaleless Goby) — Rare, southern CA
  - Psilotris amblyrhynchus (Blunt-nose Goby) — Rare, southern CA
  - Psilotris batrachodes (Toadfish Goby) — Rare, southern CA
  - Psilotris boehlkei (Boehlke's Goby) — Rare, southern CA
  - Psilotris celsus (Highbrow Goby) — Rare, southern CA
  - Psilotris kaufmani (Kaufman's Goby) — Rare, southern CA
  - Psilotris laeteviridis (Green Goby) — Rare, southern CA
- Genus Ptereleotris
  - Ptereleotris carinata (Bluebanded Dartfish) — Rare, southern CA
  - Ptereleotris evides (Blackfin Dartfish) — Rare, southern CA
  - Ptereleotris heteroptera (Tailspot Dartfish) — Rare, southern CA
  - Ptereleotris kallista (Kallista Dartfish) — Rare, southern CA
  - Ptereleotris microlepis (Blue Gudgeon) — Rare, southern CA
  - Ptereleotris monoptera (Finless Dartfish) — Rare, southern CA
  - Ptereleotris zebra (Zebra Dartfish) — Rare, southern CA
- Genus Risor
  - Risor ruber (Tusked Goby) — Rare vagrant
- Genus Robinsichthys
  - Robinsichthys arrowsmithensis (Arrowsmith Goby) — Rare, southern CA
- Genus Sicydium
  - Sicydium altum (Highland Goby) — Rare vagrant
  - Sicydium bustamantei (Bustamante's Goby) — Rare vagrant
  - Sicydium plumieri (Sirajo Goby) — Rare vagrant
- Genus Silhouettea
  - Silhouettea aegyptia (Egyptian Goby) — Rare vagrant
- Genus Stenogobius
  - Stenogobius genivittatus (Chinstripe Goby) — Rare vagrant
- Genus Thorogobius
  - Thorogobius angolensis (Angola Goby) — Rare vagrant
- Genus Tigrigobius
  - Tigrigobius digueti (Diguet's Goby) — Rare, southern CA
  - Tigrigobius inornatus (Plain Goby) — Rare, southern CA
  - Tigrigobius janssi (Janss' Goby) — Rare, southern CA
  - Tigrigobius limbaughi (Limbaugh's Goby) — Rare, southern CA
  - Tigrigobius macrodon (Bigtooth Goby) — Rare, southern CA
  - Tigrigobius pallens (Semiscale Goby) — Rare, southern CA
  - Tigrigobius redimiculus (Banded Goby) — Rare, southern CA
  - Tigrigobius saucrus (Leopard Goby) — Rare, southern CA
  - Tigrigobius zebrella (Zebra Goby) — Rare, southern CA
- Genus Tridentiger
  - Tridentiger bifasciatus (Chameleon Goby) — Introduced
- Genus Trimma
  - Trimma annosum (Bone Goby) — Rare, southern CA
  - Trimma cana (Ashy Goby) — Rare, southern CA
  - Trimma capostriatum (Barcode Goby) — Rare, southern CA
  - Trimma emeryi (Emery's Goby) — Rare, southern CA
  - Trimma fraena (Bridled Goby) — Rare, southern CA
  - Trimma grammistes (Lined Goby) — Rare, southern CA
  - Trimma haima (Haima Goby) — Rare, southern CA
  - Trimma halonevum (Spot-fin Goby) — Rare, southern CA
  - Trimma hoesei (Hoese's Goby) — Rare, southern CA
  - Trimma lantana (Lantana Goby) — Rare, southern CA
  - Trimma naudei (Naude's Goby) — Rare, southern CA
  - Trimma nomurai (Nomura's Goby) — Rare, southern CA
  - Trimma okinawae (Okinawa Goby) — Rare, southern CA
  - Trimma preclarum (Preclarum Goby) — Rare, southern CA
  - Trimma rubromaculatum (Red-spotted Goby) — Rare, southern CA
  - Trimma striatum (Striated Goby) — Rare, southern CA
  - Trimma taylori (Taylor's Goby) — Rare, southern CA
  - Trimma tevegae (Tevega's Goby) — Rare, southern CA
  - Trimma unisquame (Single-scale Goby) — Rare, southern CA
  - Trimma winchi (Winch's Goby) — Rare, southern CA
- Genus Tryssogobius
  - Tryssogobius colini (Collin's Goby) — Rare, southern CA
- Genus Varicus
  - Varicus bucca (Cheek Goby) — Rare, southern CA
  - Varicus marilynae (Marilyn's Goby) — Rare, southern CA
  - Varicus vespa (Wasp Goby) — Rare, southern CA
- Genus Zebrus
  - Zebrus zebrus (Zebra Goby) — Rare vagrant

==== Family Microdesmidae (Wormfishes) ====
- Genus Clarkichthys
  - Clarkichthys bilineatus (Banded Wormfish) — Rare, southern CA
- Genus Gunnellichthys
  - Gunnellichthys curiosus (Curious Wormfish) — Rare, southern CA
  - Gunnellichthys monostigma (Onespot Wormfish) — Rare, southern CA
  - Gunnellichthys pleurotaenia (Onestripe Wormfish) — Rare, southern CA
- Genus Microdesmus
  - Microdesmus aethiopicus (African Wormfish) — Rare vagrant
  - Microdesmus affinis (Pink Wormfish) — Rare, southern CA
  - Microdesmus bahianus (Bahia Wormfish) — Rare, southern CA
  - Microdesmus carri (Carri's Wormfish) — Rare, southern CA
  - Microdesmus dipus (Twofin Wormfish)
  - Microdesmus knappi (Knapp's Wormfish) — Rare, southern CA
  - Microdesmus lanceolatus (Lanceolate Wormfish) — Rare, southern CA
  - Microdesmus longipinnis (Longfin Wormfish) — Rare, southern CA
  - Microdesmus luscus (Blind Wormfish) — Rare, southern CA
  - Microdesmus multiradiatus (Manyspine Wormfish) — Rare, southern CA
  - Microdesmus retropinnis (Retrofin Wormfish) — Rare, southern CA
  - Microdesmus suttkusi (Suttkus' Wormfish) — Rare, southern CA

==== Family Ptereleotridae (Dartfishes) ====
- Genus Aioliops
  - Aioliops brachypterus (Shortfin Dartfish) — Rare, southern CA
  - Aioliops megastigma (Largespot Dartfish) — Rare, southern CA
  - Aioliops novaeguineae (New Guinea Dartfish) — Rare vagrant
  - Aioliops tetrophthalmus (Four-eyed Dartfish) — Rare, southern CA
- Genus Nemateleotris
  - Nemateleotris decora (Elegant Firefish) — Rare vagrant
  - Nemateleotris exquisita (Exquisite Firefish) — Rare vagrant
  - Nemateleotris helfrichi (Helfrich's Firefish) — Rare vagrant
  - Nemateleotris magnifica (Firefish) — Rare vagrant
- Genus Oxymetopon
  - Oxymetopon compressus (Compressed Dartfish) — Rare vagrant
  - Oxymetopon cyanoctenos (Blueline Dartfish) — Rare vagrant
  - Oxymetopon formosum (Beautiful Dartfish) — Rare vagrant
  - Oxymetopon typus (Blueband Dartfish) — Rare vagrant
- Genus Parioglossus
  - Parioglossus formosus (Beautiful Hovergoby) — Rare vagrant
  - Parioglossus lineatus (Lined Hovergoby) — Rare vagrant
  - Parioglossus marginalis (Dwarf Hovergoby) — Rare vagrant
  - Parioglossus philippinus (Philippine Hovergoby) — Rare vagrant
  - Parioglossus rainfordi (Rainford's Hovergoby) — Rare vagrant
  - Parioglossus raoi (Rao's Hovergoby) — Rare vagrant
  - Parioglossus taeniatus (Ribbon Hovergoby) — Rare vagrant
- Genus Ptereleotris
  - Ptereleotris carinata (Bluebanded Dartfish) — Rare, southern CA
  - Ptereleotris evides (Blackfin Dartfish) — Rare, southern CA
  - Ptereleotris heteroptera (Tailspot Dartfish) — Rare, southern CA
  - Ptereleotris kallista (Kallista Dartfish) — Rare, southern CA
  - Ptereleotris microlepis (Blue Gudgeon) — Rare, southern CA
  - Ptereleotris monoptera (Finless Dartfish) — Rare, southern CA
  - Ptereleotris zebra (Zebra Dartfish) — Rare, southern CA

==== Family Schindleriidae (Infantfishes) ====
- Genus Schindleria
  - Schindleria brevipinguis (Stout Infantfish) — Rare, southern CA
  - Schindleria praematura (Infantfish) — Rare, southern CA

==== Family Scombridae (Mackerels and Tunas) ====
- Genus Acanthocybium
  - Acanthocybium solandri (Wahoo) — Rare vagrant
- Genus Auxis
  - Auxis rochei (Bullet Tuna)
  - Auxis thazard (Frigate Tuna)
- Genus Euthynnus
  - Euthynnus alletteratus (Little Tunny) — Rare vagrant
  - Euthynnus lineatus (Black Skipjack Tuna)
- Genus Katsuwonus
  - Katsuwonus pelamis (Skipjack Tuna)
- Genus Scomber
  - Scomber australasicus (Blue Mackerel)
  - Scomber japonicus (Pacific Chub Mackerel)
- Genus Scomberomorus
  - Scomberomorus concolor (Monterey Spanish Mackerel) — Rare, southern CA
  - Scomberomorus sierra (Pacific Sierra)
- Genus Thunnus
  - Thunnus alalunga (Albacore)
  - Thunnus albacares (Yellowfin Tuna)
  - Thunnus atlanticus (Blackfin Tuna) — Rare vagrant
  - Thunnus maccoyii (Southern Bluefin Tuna) — Rare vagrant
  - Thunnus obesus (Bigeye Tuna)
  - Thunnus orientalis (Pacific Bluefin Tuna)
  - Thunnus thynnus (Atlantic Bluefin Tuna) — Rare vagrant

==== Family Xiphiidae (Swordfish) ====
- Genus Xiphias
  - Xiphias gladius (Swordfish)

==== Family Istiophoridae (Billfishes) ====
- Genus Istiompax
  - Istiompax indica (Black Marlin) — Rare vagrant
- Genus Istiophorus
  - Istiophorus platypterus (Indo-Pacific Sailfish) — Rare vagrant
- Genus Kajikia
  - Kajikia audax (Striped Marlin)
  - Kajikia albida (White Marlin) — Rare vagrant
- Genus Makaira
  - Makaira nigricans (Blue Marlin) — Rare vagrant
- Genus Tetrapturus
  - Tetrapturus angustirostris (Shortbill Spearfish) — Rare vagrant

==== Family Centrolophidae (Medusafishes) ====
- Genus Icichthys
  - Icichthys lockingtoni (Medusafish)
- Genus Psenopsis
  - Psenopsis anomala (Japanese Butterfish) — Rare vagrant
- Genus Schedophilus
  - Schedophilus haedrichi (Haedrich's Medusafish) — Deep water
  - Schedophilus huttoni (Hutton's Medusafish) — Deep water
  - Schedophilus maculatus (Spotted Medusafish) — Deep water
  - Schedophilus ovalis (Imperial Blackfish) — Deep water
  - Schedophilus pemarco (Pemarco Blackfish) — Deep water
  - Schedophilus velaini (Velain's Medusafish) — Deep water

==== Family Nomeidae (Driftfishes) ====
- Genus Cubiceps
  - Cubiceps baxteri (Black Ruff) — Deep water
  - Cubiceps caeruleus (Blue Cubiceps) — Deep water
  - Cubiceps capensis (Cape Cubiceps) — Deep water
  - Cubiceps gracilis (Slender Cubiceps) — Deep water
  - Cubiceps kotlyari (Kotlyar's Cubiceps) — Deep water
  - Cubiceps macrolepis (Bigscale Cubiceps) — Deep water
  - Cubiceps nanus (Dwarf Cubiceps) — Deep water
  - Cubiceps paradoxus (Paradox Cubiceps) — Deep water
  - Cubiceps pauciradiatus (Longfin Cubiceps) — Deep water
  - Cubiceps whiteleggii (Shadow Driftfish) — Deep water
- Genus Nomeus
  - Nomeus gronovii (Man-of-war Fish) — Rare vagrant
- Genus Psenes
  - Psenes arafurensis (Arafura Driftfish) — Deep water
  - Psenes cyanophrys (Freckled Driftfish) — Deep water
  - Psenes maculatus (Silver Driftfish) — Deep water
  - Psenes pellucidus (Bluefin Driftfish) — Deep water
  - Psenes sio (Sio Driftfish) — Deep water
- Genus Pseneus
  - Pseneus whiteleggii (Whiteleg's Driftfish) — Deep water

==== Family Ariommatidae (Ariommatids) ====
- Genus Ariomma
  - Ariomma brevimanum (Shortfin Ariomma) — Deep water
  - Ariomma dollfusi (Dollfus' Ariomma) — Deep water
  - Ariomma evermanni (Evermann's Ariomma) — Deep water
  - Ariomma indicum (Indian Ariomma) — Deep water
  - Ariomma luridum (Lurid Ariomma) — Deep water
  - Ariomma melanum (Brown Ariomma) — Deep water
  - Ariomma parini (Parin's Ariomma) — Deep water
  - Ariomma regulus (Spotted Ariomma) — Deep water

==== Family Stromateidae (Butterfishes) ====
- Genus Peprilus
  - Peprilus medius (Pacific Harvestfish)
  - Peprilus simillimus (California Harvestfish)
  - Peprilus snyderi (Salema Butterfish) — Rare, southern CA
  - Peprilus triacanthus (Butterfish) — Rare vagrant
- Genus Stromateus
  - Stromateus fiatola (Blue Butterfish) — Rare vagrant

==== Family Amarsipidae (Amarsipas) ====
- Genus Amarsipus
  - Amarsipus carlsbergi (Amarsipa) — Deep water

==== Family Tetragonuridae (Squaretails) ====
- Genus Tetragonurus
  - Tetragonurus atlanticus (Bigeye Squaretail) — Deep water
  - Tetragonurus cuvieri (Smalleye Squaretail) — Deep water
  - Tetragonurus pacificus (Pacific Squaretail) — Deep water

==== Family Caproidae (Boarfishes) ====
- Genus Antigonia
  - Antigonia capros (Deepbody Boarfish) — Deep water
  - Antigonia combatia (Shortspine Boarfish) — Deep water
  - Antigonia eos (Rosy Boarfish) — Deep water
  - Antigonia rhomboidea (Rhomboidal Boarfish) — Deep water
  - Antigonia rubescens (Indo-Pacific Boarfish) — Deep water
  - Antigonia steindachneri (Steindachner's Boarfish) — Deep water
  - Antigonia undulata (Wavy Boarfish) — Deep water

==== Family Luvaridae (Louvars) ====
- Genus Luvarus
  - Luvarus imperialis (Louvar) — Rare

==== Family Zanclidae (Moorish Idol) ====
- Genus Zanclus
  - Zanclus cornutus (Moorish Idol)

==== Family Acanthuridae (Surgeonfishes) ====
- Genus Acanthurus
  - Acanthurus achilles (Achilles Tang) — Rare vagrant
  - Acanthurus albipectoralis (Whitefin Surgeonfish) — Rare vagrant
  - Acanthurus auranticavus (Orange-socket Surgeonfish) — Rare vagrant
  - Acanthurus bahianus (Ocean Surgeon) — Rare vagrant
  - Acanthurus blochii (Ringtail Surgeonfish) — Rare vagrant
  - Acanthurus chirurgus (Doctorfish) — Rare vagrant
  - Acanthurus chronixis (Chronixis Surgeonfish) — Rare vagrant
  - Acanthurus coeruleus (Blue Tang) — Rare vagrant
  - Acanthurus dussumieri (Eyestripe Surgeonfish) — Rare vagrant
  - Acanthurus gahhm (Black Surgeonfish) — Rare vagrant
  - Acanthurus grammoptilus (Finelined Surgeonfish) — Rare vagrant
  - Acanthurus leucocheilus (Whitecheek Surgeonfish) — Rare vagrant
  - Acanthurus leucosternon (Powderblue Surgeonfish) — Rare vagrant
  - Acanthurus lineatus (Lined Surgeonfish) — Rare vagrant
  - Acanthurus maculiceps (White-freckled Surgeonfish) — Rare vagrant
  - Acanthurus mata (Elongate Surgeonfish) — Rare vagrant
  - Acanthurus monroviae (Monrovia Surgeonfish) — Rare vagrant
  - Acanthurus nigricans (Whitecheek Surgeonfish) — Rare vagrant
  - Acanthurus nigricauda (Epaulette Surgeonfish) — Rare vagrant
  - Acanthurus nigrofuscus (Brown Surgeonfish) — Rare vagrant
  - Acanthurus nigroris (Bluelined Surgeonfish) — Rare vagrant
  - Acanthurus olivaceus (Orangespot Surgeonfish) — Rare vagrant
  - Acanthurus pyroferus (Chocolate Surgeonfish) — Rare vagrant
  - Acanthurus randalli (Randall's Surgeonfish) — Rare vagrant
  - Acanthurus reversus (Reverse Surgeonfish) — Rare vagrant
  - Acanthurus sohal (Sohal Surgeonfish) — Rare vagrant
  - Acanthurus tennentii (Doubleband Surgeonfish) — Rare vagrant
  - Acanthurus thompsoni (Thompson's Surgeonfish) — Rare vagrant
  - Acanthurus triostegus (Convict Surgeonfish) — Rare vagrant
  - Acanthurus xanthopterus (Yellowfin Surgeonfish) — Rare vagrant
- Genus Ctenochaetus
  - Ctenochaetus binotatus (Twospot Bristletooth) — Rare vagrant
  - Ctenochaetus cyanocheilus (Blue-lipped Bristletooth) — Rare vagrant
  - Ctenochaetus flavicauda (Whitetail Bristletooth) — Rare vagrant
  - Ctenochaetus hawaiiensis (Hawaiian Bristletooth) — Rare vagrant
  - Ctenochaetus marginatus (Striped Bristletooth) — Rare vagrant
  - Ctenochaetus striatus (Striated Surgeonfish) — Rare vagrant
  - Ctenochaetus strigosus (Spotted Bristletooth) — Rare vagrant
  - Ctenochaetus tominiensis (Tomini Bristletooth) — Rare vagrant
  - Ctenochaetus truncatus (Truncate Bristletooth) — Rare vagrant
- Genus Naso
  - Naso annulatus (Whitemargin Unicornfish) — Rare vagrant
  - Naso brachycentron (Humpback Unicornfish) — Rare vagrant
  - Naso brevirostris (Spotted Unicornfish) — Rare vagrant
  - Naso caeruleacauda (Blue-tailed Unicornfish) — Rare vagrant
  - Naso caesius (Gray Unicornfish) — Rare vagrant
  - Naso elegans (Orangespine Unicornfish) — Rare vagrant
  - Naso fageni (Horseface Unicornfish) — Rare vagrant
  - Naso hexacanthus (Sleek Unicornfish) — Rare vagrant
  - Naso lituratus (Orangespine Unicornfish) — Rare vagrant
  - Naso lopezi (Elongate Unicornfish) — Rare vagrant
  - Naso maculatus (Spotted Unicornfish) — Rare vagrant
  - Naso minor (Small Unicornfish) — Rare vagrant
  - Naso reticulatus (Reticulate Unicornfish) — Rare vagrant
  - Naso thynnoides (Oneknife Unicornfish) — Rare vagrant
  - Naso tuberosus (Humpnose Unicornfish) — Rare vagrant
  - Naso unicornis (Bluespine Unicornfish) — Rare vagrant
  - Naso vlamingii (Bignose Unicornfish) — Rare vagrant
- Genus Paracanthurus
  - Paracanthurus hepatus (Palette Surgeonfish) — Rare vagrant
- Genus Prionurus
  - Prionurus laticlavius (Razor Surgeonfish) — Rare, southern CA
  - Prionurus maculatus (Yellowspotted Sawtail) — Rare, southern CA
  - Prionurus microlepidotus (Sixplate Sawtail) — Rare, southern CA
  - Prionurus punctatus (Yellowtail Sawtail) — Rare, southern CA
  - Prionurus scalprum (Scalpel Sawtail) — Rare vagrant
- Genus Zebrasoma
  - Zebrasoma desjardinii (Desjardin's Sailfin Tang) — Rare vagrant
  - Zebrasoma flavescens (Yellow Tang) — Rare vagrant
  - Zebrasoma gemmatum (Spotted Sailfin Tang) — Rare vagrant
  - Zebrasoma rostratum (Longnose Sailfin Tang) — Rare vagrant
  - Zebrasoma scopas (Twotone Tang) — Rare vagrant
  - Zebrasoma veliferum (Sailfin Tang) — Rare vagrant
  - Zebrasoma xanthurum (Purple Tang) — Rare vagrant

==== Family Siganidae (Rabbitfishes) ====
- Genus Siganus
  - Siganus argenteus (Forktail Rabbitfish) — Rare vagrant
  - Siganus corallinus (Blue-lined Rabbitfish) — Rare vagrant
  - Siganus doliatus (Barred Rabbitfish) — Rare vagrant
  - Siganus fuscescens (Mottled Rabbitfish) — Rare vagrant
  - Siganus guttatus (Orange-spotted Rabbitfish) — Rare vagrant
  - Siganus javus (Streaked Rabbitfish) — Rare vagrant
  - Siganus lineatus (Golden-lined Rabbitfish) — Rare vagrant
  - Siganus luridus (Dusky Rabbitfish) — Rare vagrant
  - Siganus magnificus (Magnificent Rabbitfish) — Rare vagrant
  - Siganus niger (Black Rabbitfish) — Rare vagrant
  - Siganus puellus (Masked Rabbitfish) — Rare vagrant
  - Siganus punctatissimus (Peppered Rabbitfish) — Rare vagrant
  - Siganus punctatus (Goldspotted Rabbitfish) — Rare vagrant
  - Siganus randalli (Randall's Rabbitfish) — Rare vagrant
  - Siganus rivulatus (Marbled Rabbitfish) — Rare vagrant
  - Siganus spinus (Little Spinefoot) — Rare vagrant
  - Siganus stellatus (Brown-spotted Rabbitfish) — Rare vagrant
  - Siganus sutor (Shoemaker Spinefoot) — Rare vagrant
  - Siganus vermiculatus (Vermiculated Rabbitfish) — Rare vagrant
  - Siganus virgatus (Virgate Rabbitfish) — Rare vagrant
  - Siganus vulpinus (Foxface Rabbitfish) — Rare vagrant
    - Genus Evoxymetopon
      - Evoxymetopon taeniatus (Channel Scabbardfish) — Deep water
    - Genus Lepidopus
      - Lepidopus calcar (Hawaiian Frostfish) — Deep water
      - Lepidopus caudatus (Silver Scabbardfish) — Deep water
      - Lepidopus dubius (Doubtful Frostfish) — Deep water
      - Lepidopus fitchi (Fitch's Frostfish) — Deep water
      - Lepidopus manis (Masked Frostfish) — Deep water
    - Genus Trichiurus
      - Trichiurus auriga (Pearly Hairtail) — Deep water
      - Trichiurus australis (Australian Hairtail) — Deep water
      - Trichiurus gangeticus (Ganges Hairtail) — Deep water
      - Trichiurus lepturus (Largehead Hairtail) — Deep water
      - Trichiurus margarites (Pearl Hairtail) — Deep water
      - Trichiurus nanhaiensis (South China Sea Hairtail) — Deep water
      - Trichiurus nickolensis (Australian Shorttail Hairtail) — Deep water
      - Trichiurus russelli (Short-tailed Hairtail) — Deep water

==== Family Chiasmodontidae (Swallowers) ====
- Genus Chiasmodon
  - Chiasmodon niger (Black Swallower) — Deep water
- Genus Dysalotus
  - Dysalotus alcocki (Alcock's Swallower) — Deep water
  - Dysalotus oligoscolus (Few-spined Swallower) — Deep water
- Genus Kali
  - Kali colubrina (Snake Swallower) — Deep water
  - Kali falx (Sickle Swallower) — Deep water
  - Kali indica (Indian Swallower) — Deep water
  - Kali kerberti (Kerbert's Swallower) — Deep water
  - Kali macrodon (Longtooth Swallower) — Deep water
  - Kali macrura (Longtail Swallower) — Deep water
  - Kali normani (Norman's Swallower) — Deep water
  - Kali parri (Parri's Swallower) — Deep water
- Genus Pseudoscopelus
  - Pseudoscopelus altipinnis (Highfin Swallower) — Deep water
  - Pseudoscopelus aphos (Scopelus Swallower) — Deep water
  - Pseudoscopelus astronesthidens (Astronesthids' Swallower) — Deep water
  - Pseudoscopelus cephalus (Headed Swallower) — Deep water
  - Pseudoscopelus cordilluminatus (Cordillumina Swallower) — Deep water
  - Pseudoscopelus lavenbergi (Lavenberg's Swallower) — Deep water
  - Pseudoscopelus microps (Smalleye Swallower) — Deep water
  - Pseudoscopelus obtusifrons (Bluntnose Swallower) — Deep water
  - Pseudoscopelus odontoglossum (Toothtongue Swallower) — Deep water
  - Pseudoscopelus scriptus (Scriptured Swallower) — Deep water
  - Pseudoscopelus sagamianus (Sagami Swallower) — Deep water
  - Pseudoscopelus scutatus (Shield Swallower) — Deep water
  - Pseudoscopelus stellatus (Starry Swallower) — Deep water

==== Family Anarhichadidae (Wolffishes) ====
- Genus Anarhichas
  - Anarhichas denticulatus (Northern Wolffish) — Rare, far north
  - Anarhichas lupus (Atlantic Wolffish) — Rare vagrant
  - Anarhichas minor (Spotted Wolffish) — Rare vagrant
  - Anarhichas orientalis (Bering Wolffish) — Rare, far north
- Genus Anarrhichthys
  - Anarrhichthys ocellatus (Wolf-eel)

==== Family Pholidae (Gunnels) ====
- Genus Apodichthys
  - Apodichthys flavidus (Penpoint Gunnel)
  - Apodichthys fucorum (Rockweed Gunnel)
- Genus Pholis
  - Pholis clemensi (Longfin Gunnel)
  - Pholis crassispina (Thick-spined Gunnel) — Rare, far north
  - Pholis fangi (Fang's Gunnel) — Rare vagrant
  - Pholis gunnellus (Rock Gunnel) — Rare, far north
  - Pholis laeta (Crescent Gunnel)
  - Pholis nea (Tidepool Gunnel) — Rare, far north
  - Pholis ornata (Saddleback Gunnel)
  - Pholis picta (Painted Gunnel)
  - Pholis schultzi (Red Gunnel)
- Genus Rhodymenichthys
  - Rhodymenichthys dolichogaster (Stickleback Gunnel) — Rare, far north

==== Family Stichaeidae (Pricklebacks) ====
- Genus Alectrias
  - Alectrias alectrolophus (Cockscomb Prickleback) — Rare, far north
  - Alectrias benjamini (Benjamin's Prickleback) — Rare, far north
  - Alectrias cirratus (Blenny Prickleback) — Rare, far north
  - Alectrias gallinus (Cock Prickleback) — Rare, far north
  - Alectrias mutsuensis (Mutsu Prickleback) — Rare vagrant
- Genus Anisarchus
  - Anisarchus macrops (Bigeye Prickleback) — Rare, far north
  - Anisarchus medius (Stout Eelblenny) — Rare, far north
- Genus Askoldia
  - Askoldia variegata (Variegated Prickleback) — Rare, far north
- Genus Bryozoichthys
  - Bryozoichthys lysimus (Nutcracker Prickleback) — Rare, far north
  - Bryozoichthys marjorius (Marbled Prickleback) — Rare, far north
- Genus Cebidichthys
  - Cebidichthys violaceus (Monkeyface Prickleback)
- Genus Chirolophis
  - Chirolophis decoratus (Decorated Warbonnet) — Rare, far north
  - Chirolophis japonicus (Japanese Warbonnet) — Rare vagrant
  - Chirolophis nugator (Mosshead Warbonnet)
  - Chirolophis polyactocephalus (Many-ray Warbonnet) — Rare, far north
  - Chirolophis snyderi (Snyder's Prickleback)
  - Chirolophis tarsodes (Star-eyed Prickleback) — Rare, far north
- Genus Dictyosoma
  - Dictyosoma rubrimaculatum (Red-spotted Prickleback) — Rare, far north
- Genus Ernogrammus
  - Ernogrammus hexagrammus (Sixline Prickleback) — Rare, far north
  - Ernogrammus walkeri (Walker's Prickleback) — Rare, far north
- Genus Esselenichthys
  - Esselenichthys carli (Rock Prickleback) — Rare, central CA
- Genus Eulophias
  - Eulophias tanneri (Tanner's Prickleback) — Rare, far north
- Genus Kasatkia
  - Kasatkia memorabilis (Memorable Prickleback) — Rare, far north
  - Kasatkia seigeli (Seigel's Prickleback) — Rare, central CA
- Genus Lumpenella
  - Lumpenella longirostris (Longsnout Prickleback) — Rare, far north
- Genus Lumpenus
  - Lumpenus fabricii (Slender Eelblenny) — Rare, far north
  - Lumpenus lampretaeformis (Snakeblenny) — Rare, far north
  - Lumpenus maculatus (Daubed Shanny) — Rare, far north
  - Lumpenus medius (Stout Eelblenny) — Rare, far north
  - Lumpenus sagitta (Arrow Gunnel) — Rare, far north
- Genus Neozoarces
  - Neozoarces pulcher (Beautiful Eelblenny) — Rare, far north
- Genus Opisthocentrus
  - Opisthocentrus ocellatus (Ocellated Prickleback) — Rare vagrant
  - Opisthocentrus tenuis (Slender Prickleback) — Rare, far north
  - Opisthocentrus zonope (Bandfin Prickleback) — Rare, far north
- Genus Plectobranchus
  - Plectobranchus evides (Bluebarred Prickleback)
- Genus Poroclinus
  - Poroclinus rothrocki (Whitebarred Prickleback)
- Genus Stichaeopsis
  - Stichaeopsis epallax (Three-spined Prickleback) — Rare, far north
  - Stichaeopsis nana (Dwarf Prickleback) — Rare, far north
- Genus Stichaeus
  - Stichaeus nozawae (Nozawa's Prickleback) — Rare, far north
  - Stichaeus punctatus (Arctic Shanny) — Rare, far north
- Genus Ulvaria
  - Ulvaria subbifurcata (Radiated Shanny) — Rare, far north
- Genus Xiphister
  - Xiphister atropurpureus (Black Prickleback)
  - Xiphister mucosus (Rock Prickleback)

==== Family Cryptacanthodidae (Wrymouths) ====
- Genus Cryptacanthodes
  - Cryptacanthodes aleutensis (Dwarf Wrymouth) — Rare, far north
  - Cryptacanthodes giganteus (Giant Wrymouth) — Rare, far north
  - Cryptacanthodes maculatus (Spotted Wrymouth) — Rare, far north

==== Family Zaproridae (Prowfishes) ====
- Genus Zaprora
  - Zaprora silenus (Prowfish)

==== Family Scytalinidae (Graveldivers) ====
- Genus Scytalina
  - Scytalina cerdale (Graveldiver) — Rare, far north

==== Family Bathymasteridae (Ronquils) ====
- Genus Bathymaster
  - Bathymaster caeruleofasciatus (Blueband Ronquil) — Rare, far north
  - Bathymaster derjugini (Derjugin's Ronquil) — Rare, far north
  - Bathymaster leurolepis (Smoothface Ronquil) — Rare, far north
  - Bathymaster signatus (Searcher) — Rare, far north
- Genus Rathbunella
  - Rathbunella alleni (Stripetail Ronquil)
  - Rathbunella hypoplecta (Bluebanded Ronquil)
- Genus Ronquilus
  - Ronquilus jordani (Northern Ronquil)

==== Family Ptilichthyidae (Quillfishes) ====
- Genus Ptilichthys
  - Ptilichthys goodei (Quillfish) — Rare, far north

==== Family Lumpenidae (Eelblennies) ====
- Genus Anisarchus
  - Anisarchus macrops (Bigeye Eelblenny) — Rare, far north
  - Anisarchus medius (Stout Eelblenny) — Rare, far north
- Genus Leptoclinus
  - Leptoclinus maculatus (Daubed Eelblenny) — Rare, far north
- Genus Lumpenus
  - Lumpenus fabricii (Slender Eelblenny) — Rare, far north
  - Lumpenus lampretaeformis (Snakeblenny) — Rare, far north
  - Lumpenus medius (Stout Eelblenny) — Rare, far north
  - Lumpenus sagitta (Arrow Gunnel) — Rare, far north

==== Family Zoarcidae (Eelpouts) ====
- Genus Bothrocara
  - Bothrocara brunneum (Twoline Eelpout) — Deep water
  - Bothrocara molle (Soft Eelpout) — Deep water
  - Bothrocara pusillum (Pygmy Eelpout) — Deep water
- Genus Dadyanos
  - Dadyanos insignis (Banner Eelpout) — Deep water
- Genus Dieidolycus
  - Dieidolycus adocetus (Snubnose Eelpout) — Deep water
  - Dieidolycus leptodermatus (Thinskin Eelpout) — Deep water
- Genus Gymnelus
  - Gymnelus hemifasciatus (Halfbanded Eelpout) — Rare, far north
  - Gymnelus viridis (Fish Doctor) — Rare, far north
- Genus Lycodapus
  - Lycodapus australis (Slender Eelpout) — Deep water
  - Lycodapus dermatinus (Skinned Eelpout) — Deep water
  - Lycodapus endemoscotus (Dark Eelpout) — Deep water
  - Lycodapus fierasfer (Blackmouth Eelpout) — Deep water
  - Lycodapus leptus (Pearly Eelpout) — Deep water
  - Lycodapus mandibularis (Pallid Eelpout) — Deep water
  - Lycodapus parviceps (Smallhead Eelpout) — Deep water
  - Lycodapus pachysoma (Stout Eelpout) — Deep water
  - Lycodapus psarostomatus (Specklemouth Eelpout) — Deep water
- Genus Lycodes
  - Lycodes brevipes (Shortfin Eelpout) — Deep water
  - Lycodes brueggeni (Brueggen's Eelpout) — Deep water
  - Lycodes cortezianus (Bigfin Eelpout) — Deep water
  - Lycodes diapterus (Black Eelpout)
  - Lycodes esmarkii (Esmark's Eelpout) — Deep water
  - Lycodes fasciatus (Blackbelly Eelpout) — Deep water
  - Lycodes frigidus (Glacial Eelpout) — Deep water
  - Lycodes fulvus (Brown Eelpout) — Deep water
  - Lycodes jugoricus (Marbled Eelpout) — Deep water
  - Lycodes lavalaei (Newfoundland Eelpout) — Deep water
  - Lycodes luetkenii (Luetken's Eelpout) — Deep water
  - Lycodes macrochir (Longfin Eelpout) — Deep water
  - Lycodes marisalbi (White Sea Eelpout) — Deep water
  - Lycodes microlepis (Smallscale Eelpout) — Deep water
  - Lycodes mucosus (Slimy Eelpout) — Deep water
  - Lycodes pacificus (Blackbelly Eelpout) — Deep water
  - Lycodes palearis (Wattled Eelpout) — Deep water
  - Lycodes polaris (Polar Eelpout) — Deep water
  - Lycodes raridens (Toothless Eelpout) — Deep water
  - Lycodes reticulatus (Arctic Eelpout) — Deep water
  - Lycodes rossi (Thorny Eelpout) — Deep water
  - Lycodes sagittarius (Archer Eelpout) — Deep water
  - Lycodes seminudus (Longear Eelpout) — Deep water
  - Lycodes soldatovi (Soldatov's Eelpout) — Deep water
  - Lycodes tanakae (Tanaka's Eelpout) — Deep water
  - Lycodes teraoi (Terao's Eelpout) — Deep water
  - Lycodes turneri (Polar Eelpout) — Deep water
  - Lycodes vahlii (Vahl's Eelpout) — Deep water
- Genus Lycenchelys
  - Lycenchelys albeola (White Eelpout) — Deep water
  - Lycenchelys albomaculata (Whitespotted Eelpout) — Deep water
  - Lycenchelys antarctica (Antarctic Eelpout) — Deep water
  - Lycenchelys argentina (Argentine Eelpout) — Deep water
  - Lycenchelys aurantiaca (Orange Eelpout) — Deep water
  - Lycenchelys bachmanni (Bachmann's Eelpout) — Deep water
  - Lycenchelys bellingshauseni (Bellingshausen Eelpout) — Deep water
  - Lycenchelys bullisi (Bullis' Eelpout) — Deep water
  - Lycenchelys camchatica (Kamchatka Eelpout) — Deep water
  - Lycenchelys crotalinus (Rattail Eelpout) — Deep water
  - Lycenchelys fedorovi (Fedorov's Eelpout) — Deep water
  - Lycenchelys folletti (Follett's Eelpout) — Deep water
  - Lycenchelys hippopotamus (Hippopotamus Eelpout) — Deep water
  - Lycenchelys hureaui (Hureau's Eelpout) — Deep water
  - Lycenchelys jordani (Jordan's Eelpout) — Deep water
  - Lycenchelys kolthoffi (Kolthoff's Eelpout) — Deep water
  - Lycenchelys labradorensis (Labrador Eelpout) — Deep water
  - Lycenchelys maculata (Spotty Eelpout) — Deep water
  - Lycenchelys makushok (Makushok's Eelpout) — Deep water
  - Lycenchelys muraena (Moray Eelpout) — Deep water
  - Lycenchelys nanospinata (Dwarfspine Eelpout) — Deep water
  - Lycenchelys nigripalatum (Blackpalate Eelpout) — Deep water
  - Lycenchelys parini (Parin's Eelpout) — Deep water
  - Lycenchelys paxillus (Peg Eelpout) — Deep water
  - Lycenchelys pentactina (Fiveray Eelpout) — Deep water
  - Lycenchelys platyrhina (Flatnose Eelpout) — Deep water
  - Lycenchelys porifer (Porebearing Eelpout) — Deep water
  - Lycenchelys rassi (Rass's Eelpout) — Deep water
  - Lycenchelys ratmanovi (Ratmanov's Eelpout) — Deep water
  - Lycenchelys rosea (Rosy Eelpout) — Deep water
  - Lycenchelys sarsii (Sars' Eelpout) — Deep water
  - Lycenchelys scaurus (Hardtail Eelpout) — Deep water
  - Lycenchelys squamosa (Scaly Eelpout) — Deep water
  - Lycenchelys uschakovi (Ushakov's Eelpout) — Deep water
  - Lycenchelys verrillii (Verrill's Eelpout) — Deep water
  - Lycenchelys vitiazi (Vityaz Eelpout) — Deep water
  - Lycenchelys volki (Volk's Eelpout) — Deep water
  - Lycenchelys wilkesi (Wilkes' Eelpout) — Deep water
  - Lycenchelys xanthoptera (Yellowfin Eelpout) — Deep water
- Genus Lycodopsis
  - Lycodopsis pacifica (Pacific Eelpout) — Deep water
- Genus Melanostigma
  - Melanostigma atlanticum (Atlantic Softpout) — Deep water
  - Melanostigma bathium (Slender Eelpout) — Deep water
  - Melanostigma gelatinosum (Soft Eelpout) — Deep water
  - Melanostigma orientale (Oriental Eelpout) — Deep water
  - Melanostigma pammelas (Midwater Eelpout) — Deep water
- Genus Pachycara
  - Pachycara bulbiceps (Bulbhead Eelpout) — Deep water
  - Pachycara crossacanthum (Ribbontail Eelpout) — Deep water
  - Pachycara dolichaulus (Longtail Eelpout) — Deep water
  - Pachycara garricki (Garrick's Eelpout) — Deep water
  - Pachycara goni (Gon's Eelpout) — Deep water
  - Pachycara lepinium (Scalybreast Eelpout) — Deep water
  - Pachycara mesoporum (Midpore Eelpout) — Deep water
  - Pachycara microcephalum (Smallhead Eelpout) — Deep water
  - Pachycara nazca

==== Family Anguillidae (Freshwater Eels) ====
- Genus Anguilla
  - Anguilla rostrata (American Eel) — Extremely rare vagrant; primarily an Atlantic species.

==== Family Chlopsidae (False Morays) ====
- Genus Kaupichthys
  - Kaupichthys diodontus (Common False Moray) — Rare, southern CA
  - Kaupichthys hyoproroides (False Moray) — Rare, southern CA
  - Kaupichthys nuchalis (Collared Eel) — Rare, southern CA

==== Family Muraenidae (Moray Eels) ====
- Genus Enchelycore
  - Enchelycore octaviana (Mottled Moray) — Rare, southern CA
- Genus Gymnothorax
  - Gymnothorax castaneus (Chestnut Moray) — Rare, southern CA
  - Gymnothorax flavimarginatus (Yellow-edged Moray) — Very rare vagrant
  - Gymnothorax mordax (California Moray) — Common in southern CA
  - Gymnothorax panamensis (Panamic Moray) — Rare, southern CA
  - Gymnothorax undulatus (Undulated Moray) — Very rare vagrant
- Genus Muraena
  - Muraena lentiginosa (Jewel Moray) — Rare, southern CA
- Genus Uropterygius
  - Uropterygius macrocephalus (Needle-tooth Moray) — Very rare vagrant

==== Family Heterenchelyidae (Mud Eels) ====
- Genus Pythonichthys
  - Pythonichthys asodes (Pacific Mud Eel) — Rare, deep water

==== Family Moringuidae (Spaghetti Eels) ====
- Genus Moringua
  - Moringua edwardsi (Spaghetti Eel) — Rare vagrant

==== Family Congridae (Conger Eels) ====
- Genus Ariosoma
  - Ariosoma opistophthalmum (Ridgetail Conger) — Rare, deep water
- Genus Bassanago
  - Bassanago bulbiceps (Swollenhead Conger) — Rare, deep water
- Genus Conger
  - Conger oceanicus (American Conger) — Rare vagrant; primarily Atlantic.
- Genus Gnathophis
  - Gnathophis catalinensis (Catalina Conger) — Rare, southern CA
  - Gnathophis cinctus (Girdled Conger) — Rare, deep water
- Genus Paraconger
  - Paraconger californiensis (California Conger) — Rare, deep water
- Genus Pseudophichthys
  - Pseudophichthys splendens (Splendid Conger) — Rare, deep water
- Genus Rhynchoconger
  - Rhynchoconger ectenurus (Longtail Conger) — Rare, deep water
  - Rhynchoconger nitens (Shining Conger) — Rare, deep water

==== Family Nettastomatidae (Duckbill Eels) ====
- Genus Facciolella
  - Facciolella equatorialis (Dogface Witch Eel) — Rare, deep water
- Genus Hoplunnis
  - Hoplunnis diomediana (Blacktail Pike-conger) — Rare, deep water
  - Hoplunnis megista (Freetail Pike-conger) — Rare, deep water
  - Hoplunnis pacifica (Pacific Pike-conger) — Rare, deep water
  - Hoplunnis punctata (Spotted Pike-conger) — Rare, deep water
  - Hoplunnis schmidti (Silver Pike-conger) — Rare, deep water
  - Hoplunnis tenuis (Slender Pike-conger) — Rare, deep water
- Genus Nettastoma
  - Nettastoma melanurum (Blackfin Sorcerer) — Rare, deep water
- Genus Saurenchelys
  - Saurenchelys stylura (Longneck Eel) — Rare, deep water
- Genus Venefica
  - Venefica ocella (Fangtooth Duckbill Eel) — Rare, deep water
  - Venefica proboscidea (Whipsnout Sorcerer) — Rare, deep water
  - Venefica tentaculata (Threadtail Sorcerer) — Rare, deep water

==== Family Serrivomeridae (Sawtooth Eels) ====
- Genus Serrivomer
  - Serrivomer beani (Stout Sawpalate) — Rare, deep water
  - Serrivomer jesperseni (Jespersen's Sawpalate) — Rare, deep water
  - Serrivomer lanceolatoides (Short-tooth Sawpalate) — Rare, deep water
  - Serrivomer schmidti (Schmidt's Sawpalate) — Rare, deep water
  - Serrivomer sector (Sawtooth Eel) — Rare, deep water

==== Family Nemichthyidae (Snipe Eels) ====
- Genus Avocettina
  - Avocettina bowersii (Spoon-nose Eel) — Rare, deep water
  - Avocettina infans (Blackline Snipe Eel) — Rare, deep water
- Genus Nemichthys
  - Nemichthys curvirostris (Boxer Snipe Eel) — Rare, deep water
  - Nemichthys larseni (Larsen's Snipe Eel) — Rare, deep water
  - Nemichthys scolopaceus (Slender Snipe Eel) — Rare, deep water

==== Family Synaphobranchidae (Cutthroat Eels) ====
- Genus Diastobranchus
  - Diastobranchus capensis (Basketwork Eel) — Rare, deep water
- Genus Histiobranchus
  - Histiobranchus bathybius (Deepwater Arrowtooth Eel) — Rare, deep water
- Genus Ilyophis
  - Ilyophis arx (Wishbone Eel) — Rare, deep water
  - Ilyophis blachei (Blache's Cutthroat Eel) — Rare, deep water
  - Ilyophis brunneus (Muddy Arrowtooth Eel) — Rare, deep water
  - Ilyophis nigeli (Nigel's Cutthroat Eel) — Rare, deep water
  - Ilyophis robinsae (Robins' Cutthroat Eel) — Rare, deep water
  - Ilyophis saldanhai (Saldanha Cutthroat Eel) — Rare, deep water
- Genus Synaphobranchus
  - Synaphobranchus affinis (Grey Cutthroat Eel) — Rare, deep water
  - Synaphobranchus brevidorsalis (Shortdorsal Cutthroat Eel) — Rare, deep water
  - Synaphobranchus calvus (Bald Cutthroat Eel) — Rare, deep water
  - Synaphobranchus kaupii (Kaup's Arrowtooth Eel) — Rare, deep water

==== Family Ophichthidae (Snake Eels and Worm Eels) ====
- Genus Ahlia
  - Ahlia egmontis (Key Worm Eel) — Rare vagrant
- Genus Apterichtus
  - Apterichtus flavicaudus (Orange-tail Snake Eel) — Rare, southern CA
  - Apterichtus kendalli (Finless Eel) — Rare, southern CA
- Genus Bascanichthys
  - Bascanichthys bascanium (Sooty Eel) — Rare, southern CA
  - Bascanichthys bascanoides (Sooty Sand Eel) — Rare, southern CA
  - Bascanichthys deraniyagalai (Deraniyagala's Eel) — Rare vagrant
- Genus Callechelys
  - Callechelys bilinearis (Twostripe Snake Eel) — Rare, southern CA
  - Callechelys catostoma (Black-striped Snake Eel) — Rare, southern CA
  - Callechelys galapagensis (Galapagos Snake Eel) — Rare, southern CA
  - Callechelys guineensis (Guinea Snake Eel) — Rare vagrant
  - Callechelys marmorata (Marbled Snake Eel) — Rare, southern CA
- Genus Echiophis
  - Echiophis intertinctus (Spotted Spoon-nose Eel) — Rare vagrant
- Genus Ethadophis
  - Ethadophis byrnei (Byrne's Eel) — Rare, deep water
  - Ethadophis merenda (Pacific Snake Eel) — Rare, deep water
- Genus Evips
  - Evips percinctus (Shining Sand Eel) — Rare, southern CA
- Genus Gordiichthys
  - Gordiichthys combibus (String Eel) — Rare, southern CA
  - Gordiichthys ergodes (Boring Eel) — Rare, southern CA
  - Gordiichthys irretitus (Banded Eel) — Rare, southern CA
  - Gordiichthys leibyi (String Eel) — Rare, southern CA
- Genus Herpetoichthys
  - Herpetoichthys regius (Reptilian Snake Eel) — Rare, southern CA
- Genus Leiuranus
  - Leiuranus semicinctus (Banded Snake Eel) — Rare vagrant
- Genus Letharchus
  - Letharchus velifer (Sailfin Eel) — Rare, southern CA
- Genus Myrichthys
  - Myrichthys maculosus (Tiger Snake Eel) — Rare vagrant
  - Myrichthys magnificus (Magnificent Snake Eel) — Rare vagrant
  - Myrichthys tigrinus (Spotted Tiger Snake Eel) — Rare, southern CA
  - Myrichthys xysturus (Sharptail Eel) — Rare, southern CA
- Genus Ophichthus
  - Ophichthus apicalis (Bluntnose Snake Eel) — Rare, southern CA
  - Ophichthus arneutes (Shrimp Eel) — Rare, southern CA
  - Ophichthus bonaparti (Napoleon Snake Eel) — Rare, southern CA
  - Ophichthus brachynotopterus (Shortfin Snake Eel) — Rare, southern CA
  - Ophichthus celebicus (Celebes Snake Eel) — Rare vagrant
  - Ophichthus cruentifer (Margined Snake Eel) — Rare, southern CA
  - Ophichthus cylindroideus (Cylindrical Snake Eel) — Rare, southern CA
  - Ophichthus echeloides (Short-tooth Snake Eel) — Rare, southern CA
  - Ophichthus gomesii (Shrimp Eel) — Rare vagrant
  - Ophichthus grandoculis (Longeye Snake Eel) — Rare, southern CA
  - Ophichthus melope (Threadtail Snake Eel) — Rare, southern CA
  - Ophichthus mystacinus (Moustache Snake Eel) — Rare, southern CA
  - Ophichthus omorgmus (Muddy Snake Eel) — Rare, southern CA
  - Ophichthus rex (King Snake Eel) — Rare, southern CA
  - Ophichthus rutidoderma (Olive Snake Eel) — Rare, southern CA
  - Ophichthus triserialis (Pacific Snake Eel) — Rare, southern CA
  - Ophichthus zophochir (Yellow Snake Eel) — Rare, southern CA
- Genus Phyllophichthus
  - Phyllophichthus xenodontus (Fringelip Snake Eel) — Rare vagrant
- Genus Quassiremus
  - Quassiremus evionthas (Saddleback Eel) — Rare, southern CA
  - Quassiremus nothochir (Short-fin Eel) — Rare, southern CA
- Genus Scytalichthys
  - Scytalichthys miurus (Shorttail Snake Eel) — Rare, southern CA
- Genus Xyrias
  - Xyrias revulsus (Strict Snake Eel) — Rare, deep water
- Genus Yirrkala
  - Yirrkala lumbricoides (Earthworm Eel) — Rare vagrant
  - Yirrkala misolensis (Misol Eel) — Rare vagrant
  - Yirrkala moluccensis (Molucca Eel) — Rare vagrant
  - Yirrkala moorei (Moore's Eel) — Rare vagrant
  - Yirrkala tenuis (Slender Eel) — Rare vagrant

==== Family Alepocephalidae (Slickheads) ====
- Genus Alepocephalus
  - Alepocephalus tenebrosus (California Slickhead) — Deep water
- Genus Bajacalifornia
  - Bajacalifornia burragei (Burrage's Slickhead) — Deep water
  - Bajacalifornia megalops (Bigeye Slickhead) — Deep water
- Genus Photostylus
  - Photostylus pycnopterus (Bearded Slickhead) — Deep water
- Genus Rouleina
  - Rouleina attrita (Soft Slickhead) — Deep water
  - Rouleina eucla (Eucla Slickhead) — Deep water
  - Rouleina squamilatera (Bluntsnout Slickhead) — Deep water

==== Family Platytroctidae (Tubeshoulders) ====
- Genus Barbantus
  - Barbantus curvifrons (Palebelly Searobin) — Deep water
- Genus Holtbyrnia
  - Holtbyrnia anomala (Bighead Searsid) — Deep water
- Genus Mentodus
  - Mentodus perforatus (Pored Tubeshoulder) — Deep water
- Genus Normichthys
  - Normichthys operosus (Multipore Lightfish) — Deep water
- Genus Persparsia
  - Persparsia kopua (Spangled Tubeshoulder) — Deep water
- Genus Sagamichthys
  - Sagamichthys abei (Shining Tubeshoulder) — Deep water

==== Family Cetomimidae (Flabby Whalefishes) ====
- Genus Cetichthys
  - Cetichthys parini (Parin's Whalefish) — Deep water
- Genus Cetomimus
  - Cetomimus gillii (Gill's Whalefish) — Deep water
- Genus Ditropichthys
  - Ditropichthys storeri (Storer's Whalefish) — Deep water
- Genus Gyrinomimus
  - Gyrinomimus bruuni (Brun's Whalefish) — Deep water
  - Gyrinomimus grahami (Graham's Whalefish) — Deep water
  - Gyrinomimus myersi (Myers' Whalefish) — Deep water

==== Family Megalomycteridae (Bignose Fishes) ====
- Genus Ataxolepis
  - Ataxolepis apus (Bignose Fish) — Deep water
- Genus Megalomycter
  - Megalomycter teevani (Teevan's Bignose Fish) — Deep water

==== Family Mirapinnidae (Hairyfish) ====
- Genus Mirapinna
  - Mirapinna esau (Hairyfish) — Deep water

==== Family Stephanoberycidae (Pricklefishes) ====
- Genus Acanthochaenus
  - Acanthochaenus luetkenii (Pricklefish) — Deep water
- Genus Malacosarcus
  - Malacosarcus macrostoma (Softskin Smooth-head) — Deep water
- Genus Stephanoberyx
  - Stephanoberyx monae (Pricklefish) — Deep water

==== Family Hispidoberycidae (Bristlyskin) ====
- Genus Hispidoberyx
  - Hispidoberyx ambagiosus (Bristlyskin) — Deep water

==== Family Barbourisiidae (Red Whalefish) ====
- Genus Barbourisia
  - Barbourisia rufa (Velvet Whalefish) — Deep water

==== Family Rondeletiidae (Redmouth Whalefishes) ====
- Genus Rondeletia
  - Rondeletia bicolor (Redmouth Whalefish) — Deep water
  - Rondeletia loricata (Hardplate Whalefish) — Deep water

==== Family Diretmidae (Spinyfins) ====
- Genus Diretmichthys
  - Diretmichthys parini (Spinyfin) — Deep water
- Genus Diretmus
  - Diretmus argenteus (Silver Spinyfin) — Deep water

==== Family Anoplogastridae (Fangtooths) ====
- Genus Anoplogaster
  - Anoplogaster brachycera (Shorthorn Fangtooth) — Deep water
  - Anoplogaster cornuta (Common Fangtooth) — Deep water

==== Family Monognathidae (Onejaw Gulpers) ====
- Genus Monognathus
  - Monognathus ahlstromi (Onejaw Gulper) — Deep water
  - Monognathus bertini (Bertin's Onejaw) — Deep water
  - Monognathus boehlkei (Boehlke's Onejaw) — Deep water
  - Monognathus bruuni (Bruun's Onejaw) — Deep water
  - Monognathus herringi (Herring's Onejaw) — Deep water
  - Monognathus isaacsi (Isaacs' Onejaw) — Deep water
  - Monognathus jesperseni (Jespersen's Onejaw) — Deep water
  - Monognathus jesse (Jesse's Onejaw) — Deep water
  - Monognathus nigeli (Nigel's Onejaw) — Deep water
  - Monognathus oceanicus (Oceanic Onejaw) — Deep water
  - Monognathus rajui (Raju's Onejaw) — Deep water
  - Monognathus rosenblatti (Rosenblatt's Onejaw) — Deep water
  - Monognathus smithi (Smith's Onejaw) — Deep water
  - Monognathus taningi (Taning's Onejaw) — Deep water

==== Family Eurypharyngidae (Gulper Eels) ====
- Genus Eurypharynx
  - Eurypharynx pelecanoides (Pelican Eel) — Deep water

==== Family Saccopharyngidae (Swallowers) ====
- Genus Saccopharynx
  - Saccopharynx ampullaceus (Gulper Eel) — Deep water
  - Saccopharynx berteli (Bertel's Gulper) — Deep water
  - Saccopharynx harrisoni (Harrison's Gulper) — Deep water
  - Saccopharynx lavenbergi (Lavenberg's Gulper) — Deep water
  - Saccopharynx ramosus (Whiptail Gulper) — Deep water
  - Saccopharynx schmidti (Schmidt's Gulper) — Deep water
  - Saccopharynx thalassa (Ocean Gulper) — Deep water

==== Family Cyematidae (Bobtail Snipe Eels) ====
- Genus Cyema
  - Cyema atrum (Bobtail Eel) — Deep water
- Genus Neocyema
  - Neocyema erythrosoma (Red Bobtail) — Deep water

== Introduced Species ==
The following is a list of notable fish species that have been introduced to California and have established self-sustaining populations. This list is not exhaustive but covers the most impactful and widespread introductions.

- Alosa pseudoharengus (Alewife) — Introduced
- Ameiurus catus (White Catfish) — Introduced
- Ameiurus natalis (Yellow Bullhead) — Introduced
- Carassius auratus (Goldfish) — Introduced
- Ctenopharyngodon idella (Grass Carp) — Introduced (sterile)
- Cyprinus carpio (Common Carp) — Introduced
- Dorosoma cepedianum (Gizzard Shad) — Introduced
- Dorosoma petenense (Threadfin Shad) — Introduced
- Gambusia affinis (Western Mosquitofish) — Introduced
- Hypophthalmichthys molitrix (Silver Carp) — Introduced (limited)
- Hypophthalmichthys nobilis (Bighead Carp) — Introduced (limited)
- Ictalurus furcatus (Blue Catfish) — Introduced
- Ictalurus punctatus (Channel Catfish) — Introduced
- Lepomis cyanellus (Green Sunfish) — Introduced
- Lepomis gibbosus (Pumpkinseed) — Introduced
- Lepomis macrochirus (Bluegill) — Introduced
- Lepomis microlophus (Redear Sunfish) — Introduced
- Menidia beryllina (Inland Silverside) — Introduced
- Micropterus dolomieu (Smallmouth Bass) — Introduced
- Micropterus floridanus (Florida Largemouth Bass) — Introduced (subspecies)
- Micropterus salmoides (Largemouth Bass) — Introduced
- Morone americana (White Perch) — Introduced (rare)
- Morone chrysops (White Bass) — Introduced
- Morone saxatilis (Striped Bass) — Introduced
- Notemigonus crysoleucas (Golden Shiner) — Introduced
- Oncorhynchus aguabonita (Golden Trout) — Introduced outside native range
- Oncorhynchus clarkii (Cutthroat Trout) — Non-native subspecies introduced
- Oreochromis aureus (Blue Tilapia) — Introduced
- Oreochromis mossambicus (Mozambique Tilapia) — Introduced
- Oreochromis niloticus (Nile Tilapia) — Introduced
- Perca flavescens (Yellow Perch) — Introduced
- Pimephales promelas (Fathead Minnow) — Introduced
- Pomoxis annularis (White Crappie) — Introduced
- Pomoxis nigromaculatus (Black Crappie) — Introduced
- Ptychocheilus lucius (Colorado Pikeminnow) — Reintroduced (extirpated)
- Salmo trutta (Brown Trout) — Introduced
- Salvelinus fontinalis (Brook Trout) — Introduced
- Salvelinus namaycush (Lake Trout) — Introduced
- Sander canadensis (Sauger) — Introduced (rare)
- Sander vitreus (Walleye) — Introduced
- Tinca tinca (Tench) — Introduced
