= Dadyanos =

Scientific classification
- Kingdom: Animalia
- Phylum: Chordata
- Class: Actinopterygii
- Order: Perciformes
- Family: Zoarcidae
- Subfamily: Lycodinae
- Genus: Dadyanos; Whitley, 1951
- Species: D. insignis

Binomial name
- Dadyanos insignis (Steindachner, 1898)

Synonyms
- Platea insignis Steindachner, 1898

Genus of fishes

Dadyanos is a monospecific genus of marine ray-finned fish belonging to the family Zoarcidae, the eelpouts. Its only species is Dadyanos insignis which is found in the southwestern Atlantic Ocean.
