= Nemaclinus atelestos =

Conservation status
- Least Concern (IUCN 3.1)

Scientific classification
- Kingdom: Animalia
- Phylum: Chordata
- Class: Actinopterygii
- Order: Blenniiformes
- Family: Labrisomidae
- Genus: Nemaclinus
- Species: N. atelestos

Binomial name
- Nemaclinus atelestos J. E. Böhlke & V. G. Springer, 1975

Species of fish

Nemaclinus atelestos, the Threadfin blenny, is a species of labrisomid blenny known from the western Atlantic Ocean. This species is the only known member of its genus.
