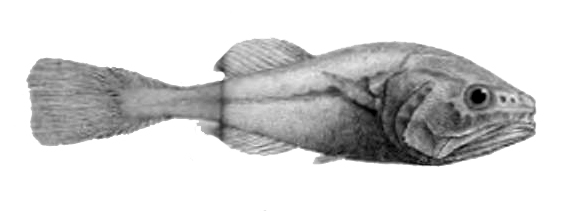

Conservation status
- Least Concern (IUCN 3.1)

Scientific classification
- Kingdom: Animalia
- Phylum: Chordata
- Class: Actinopterygii
- Division: Teleostei
- Order: Beryciformes
- Family: Stephanoberycidae
- Genus: Malacosarcus; Günther, 1887
- Species: M. macrostoma

Binomial name
- Malacosarcus macrostoma Günther, 1878

= Malacosarcus =

Species of fish

Malacosarcus is a monotypic genus of pricklefish found in the western central Pacific Ocean and possibly the northeast Atlantic Ocean at depths of from 2,777 to 4,438 metres (9,111 to 14,560 ft). Its only known species is Malacosarcus macrostoma.
