= Evips =

Conservation status
- Data Deficient (IUCN 3.1)

Scientific classification
- Kingdom: Animalia
- Phylum: Chordata
- Class: Actinopterygii
- Order: Anguilliformes
- Family: Ophichthidae
- Subfamily: Ophichthinae
- Genus: Evips; McCosker, 1972
- Species: E. percinctus

Binomial name
- Evips percinctus McCosker, 1972

Genus of fish

Evips percinctus, or the False saddled snake-eel, is a species of eel in the family Ophichthidae. It is the only member of its genus. It is found only in the Pacific Ocean in the vicinity of Palau, occurring in reef environments. The only known specimen, a 12.6 cm (5.0 in) juvenile, was caught off Kayangel Island in 1956.
