= Megalomycter =

Scientific classification
- Kingdom: Animalia
- Phylum: Chordata
- Class: Actinopterygii
- Order: Beryciformes
- Family: Cetomimidae
- Genus: Megalomycter; G. S. Myers & Freihofer, 1966
- Species: M. teevani

Binomial name
- Megalomycter teevani G. S. Myers & Freihofer, 1966

Species of fish

Megalomycter teevani is a species of fish in the family Cetomimidae found in the waters of the Atlantic Ocean near Bermuda at depths of around 1,647 metres (5,404 ft). This species is the only known member of its genus.
