= Scytalichthys =

Scientific classification
- Kingdom: Animalia
- Phylum: Chordata
- Class: Actinopterygii
- Order: Anguilliformes
- Family: Ophichthidae
- Subfamily: Ophichthinae
- Genus: Scytalichthys; D. S. Jordan & B. M. Davis, 1891
- Species: S. miurus

Binomial name
- Scytalichthys miurus (D. S. Jordan & C. H. Gilbert, 1882)

Species of fish

Scytalichthys miurus, the short-tailed viper-eel, is a species of eel in the family Ophichthidae. It is the only member of its genus. It is found in the eastern Pacific Ocean around Mexico and the Galapagos Islands.
