= Ribeiroclinus eigenmanni =

South American weedfish

Conservation status
- Least Concern (IUCN 3.1)

Scientific classification
- Kingdom: Animalia
- Phylum: Chordata
- Class: Actinopterygii
- Order: Blenniiformes
- Family: Clinidae
- Genus: Ribeiroclinus; S. Y. Pinto, 1965
- Species: R. eigenmanni

Binomial name
- Ribeiroclinus eigenmanni (D. S. Jordan, 1888)

Synonyms
- Cristiceps eigenmanni D. S. Jordan, 1888

Species of fish

The South American weedfish (Ribeiroclinus eigenmanni) is a species of clinid found along the Atlantic coast of South America from southern Brazil to central Argentina where it has been found at a depth of about 17 metres (56 ft). It can reach a maximum length of 4.4 centimetres (1.7 in). This species is currently the only known member of its genus. The specific name honours the ichthyologist Carl H. Eigenmann (1863–1927).
