= Flappy snake-eel =

Scientific classification
- Kingdom: Animalia
- Phylum: Chordata
- Class: Actinopterygii
- Order: Anguilliformes
- Family: Ophichthidae
- Subfamily: Ophichthinae
- Genus: Phyllophichthus; Gosline, 1951
- Species: P. xenodontus

Binomial name
- Phyllophichthus xenodontus Gosline, 1951

Synonyms
- Phyllophichthus macrurus McKay, 1970

Species of fish

The Flappy snake-eel (Phyllophichthus xenodontus) is an eel in the family Ophichthidae (worm/snake eels), and the only species in the genus Phyllophichthus. It was described by William Alonzo Gosline in 1951. It is a marine, tropical eel which is known from the Indo-Pacific, including East Africa, the Hawaiian Islands, the Marquesan Islands, the Society Islands, the Caroline Islands and the Marshall Islands. It dwells at a depth range of 8–30 metres, and inhabits reefs and inshore waters. It leads a benthic lifestyle, and forms burrows. Males can reach a maximum total length of 42 centimetres.
