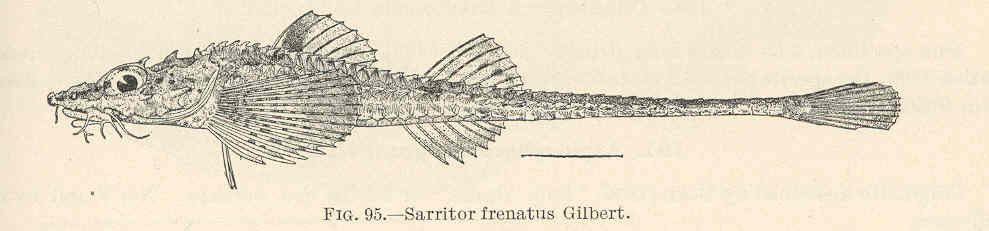
- Leptagonus frenatus

Scientific classification
- Kingdom: Animalia
- Phylum: Chordata
- Class: Actinopterygii
- Division: Teleostei
- Order: Perciformes
- Suborder: Cottoidei
- Family: Agonidae
- Subfamily: Agoninae
- Genus: Leptagonus; Gill, 1861

Type species
- Aspidophorus spinosissimus Krøyer, 1845

Synonyms
- Archagonus Lütken, 1877; Sarritor Cramer in Jordan & Evermann, 1896

= Leptagonus =

Genus of fishes

Leptagonus is a genus of poachers native to the northern Pacific Ocean.

== Species ==
There are currently four recognized species in this genus:

- Leptagonus decagonus (Bloch & J. G. Schneider, 1801) (Atlantic poacher)
- Leptagonus frenatus (C. H. Gilbert, 1896) (Sawback poacher)
- Leptagonus knipowitschi (Lindberg & Andriashev, 1937)
- Leptagonus leptorhynchus (C. H. Gilbert, 1896) (Longnose poacher)

Some authorities accept Leptagonus as a monospecific genus, featuring only L. decagonus, with the other three in Sarritor.
