= Leptagonus knipowitschi =

Scientific classification
- Kingdom: Animalia
- Phylum: Chordata
- Class: Actinopterygii
- Division: Teleostei
- Order: Perciformes
- Suborder: Cottoidei
- Family: Agonidae
- Genus: Leptagonus
- Species: L. knipowitschi

Binomial name
- Leptagonus knipowitschi (Lindberg & Andriashev, 1937)

Synonyms
- Sarritor leptorhynchus Lindberg & Andriashev, 1937; Sarritor leptorhynchus knipowitschi Lindberg & Andriashev, 1937

Species of fish

Sarritor knipowitschi is a poacher fish in the family Agonidae. It was described by Georgii Ustinovich Lindberg and Anatoly Petrovich Andriyashev in 1937, originally as a subspecies of Sarritor leptorhynchus. It is a marine, temperate water-dwelling fish which is known from the Okhotsk Sea and the Sea of Japan, in the northwestern Pacific Ocean. It is known to dwell at a depth range of 30 to 190 metres (100 to 620 ft). Males can reach a maximum standard length of 14.4 centimetres (5.7 in).
