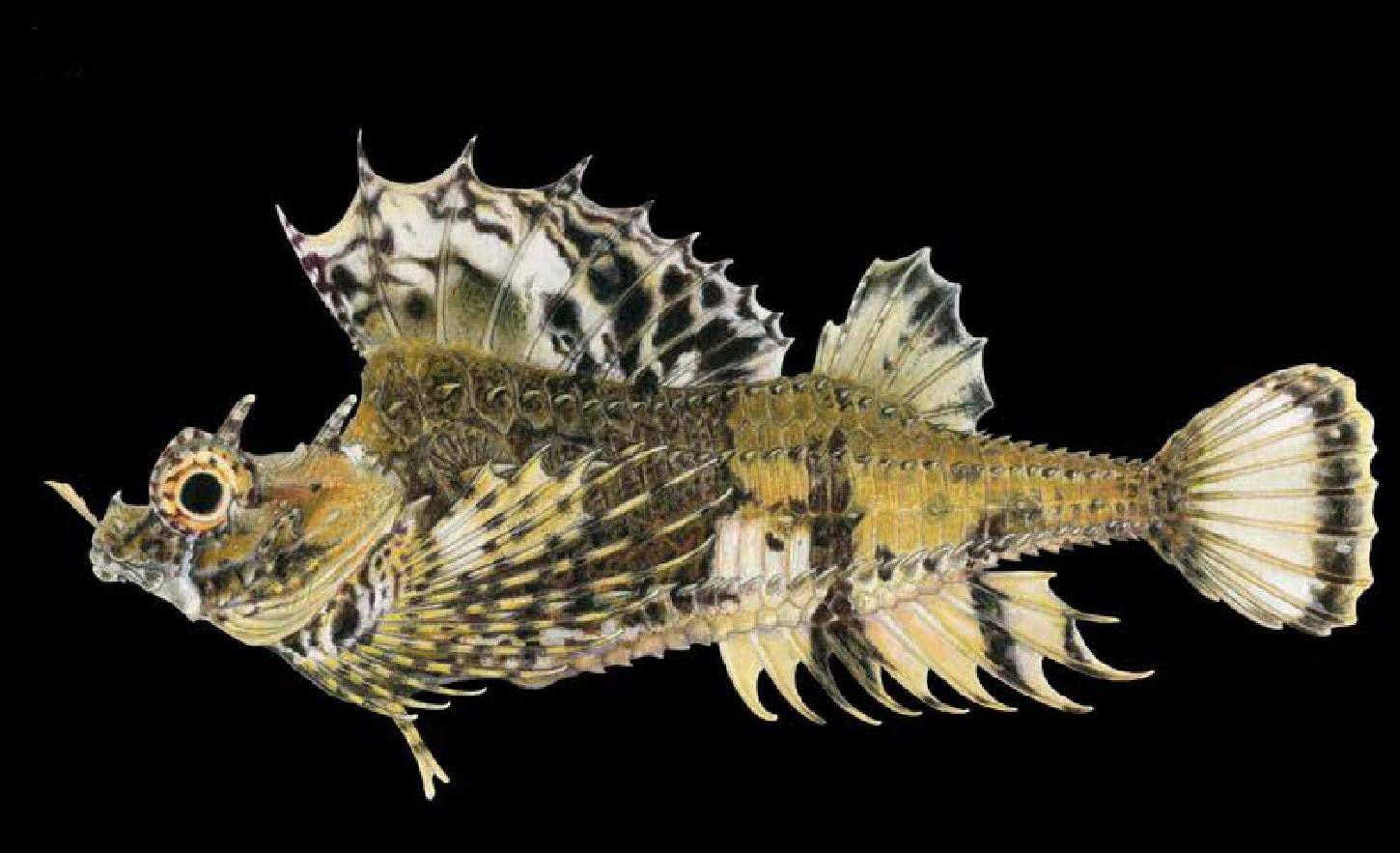
- Fourhorn poacher (Hypsagonus quadricorni)

Scientific classification
- Kingdom: Animalia
- Phylum: Chordata
- Class: Actinopterygii
- Order: Perciformes
- Suborder: Cottoidei
- Family: Agonidae
- Subfamily: Hypsagoninae; Gill, 1861

Genera
- see text

= Hypsagoninae =

Subfamily of fishes

Hypsagoninae is a subfamily of marine ray-finned fishes belonging to the family Agonidae, part of the sculpin superfamily Cottoidea. These fishes are found in the North Pacific Ocean.

== Taxonomy ==
Hypsagoninae was first proposed as a taxonomic grouping in 1861 by the American zoologist Theodore Gill. Some workers have regarded the genus Agonomalus as synonymous with Hypsagonus and place the two remaining genera in the subfamily Percidinae which was also named by Gill in 1897. However, most authorities recognise the three genera and place them in the subfamily Hypsagoninae. The 5th edition of Fishes of the World classifies the Hypsagoninae within the family Agonidae, part of the superfamily Cottoidea, the sculpins.

== Genera ==
Hypsagoninae contains following 3 genera:

- Agonomalus Guichenot, 1866
- Hypsagonus Gill, 1861
- Percis Scopoli, 1777

== Characteristics ==
Hypsagoninae sculpins typically have deep, laterally compressed bodies with a terminal mouth which has nearly equal jaws, The rear edge of the orbit is convex. The bony plates on the body are arranged in groups and rows which are bot clearly distinct and do not have exact margins and are made up of plates that differ in size and shape. There are plates on the first dorsal fin and the pectoral fin and there is no enlarged plate on the snout. The first dorsal fin is supported by strong spines. The smallest species is the kelp poacher (Agonomalus mozinoi) which has a maximum published total length of 8.9 cm (3.5 in) while the largest is the dragon poacher (Percis japonica) ith a maximum published total length of 42 cm (17 in).

== Distribution ==
Hypsagoninae sculpins are found in the northern Pacific Ocean from Japan north to the Chukchi Sea and south to California.
