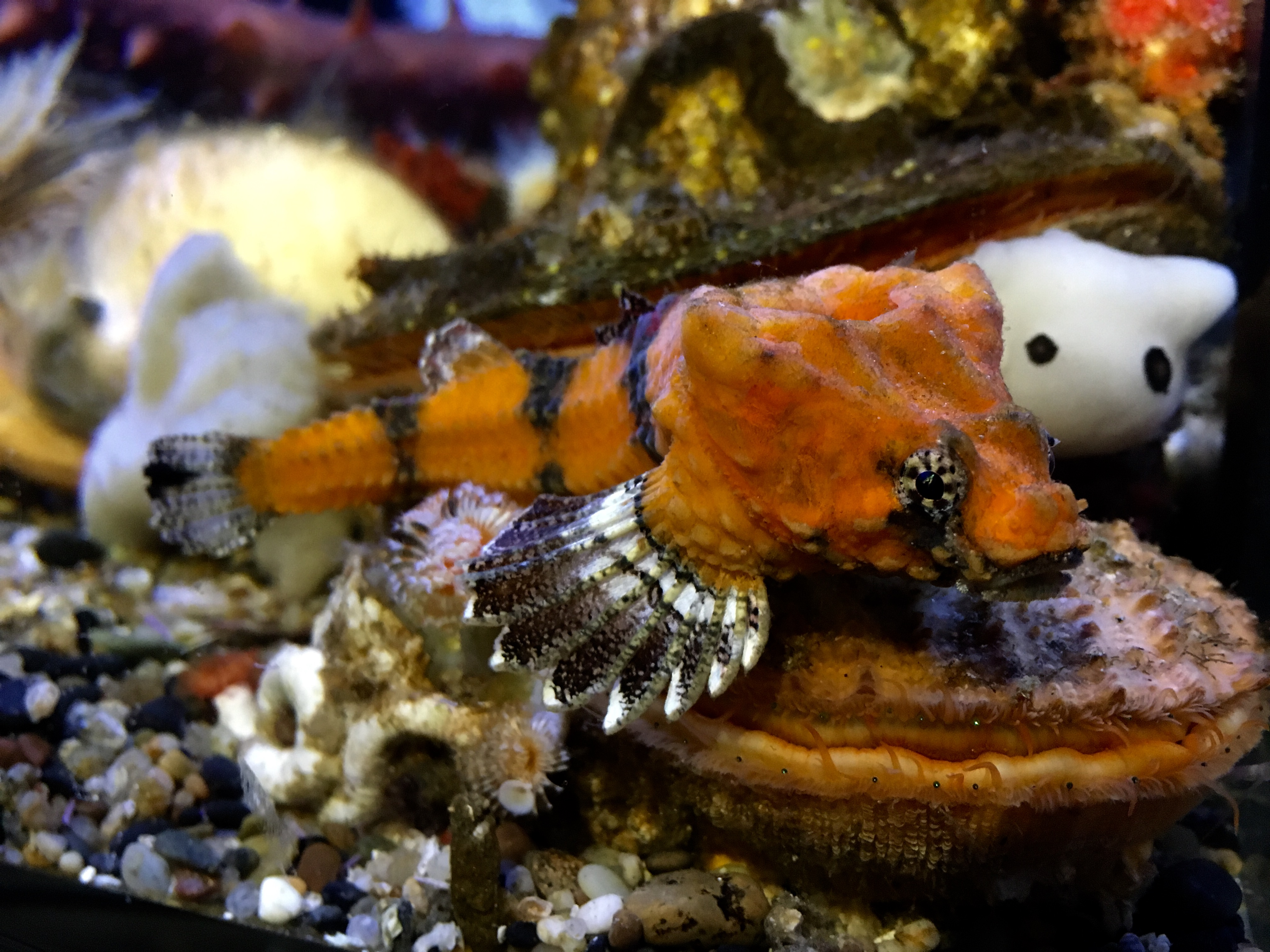
- A rockhead on top of a rock scallop at the Oregon Coast Aquarium.

Scientific classification
- Kingdom: Animalia
- Phylum: Chordata
- Class: Actinopterygii
- Order: Perciformes
- Suborder: Cottoidei
- Family: Agonidae
- Genus: Bothragonus
- Species: B. swanii

Binomial name
- Bothragonus swanii (Steindachner, 1876)

Synonyms
- Hypsagonus swanii Steindachner, 1876; Bothragonus swani (Steindachner, 1876)

= Bothragonus swanii =

Species of fish

Bothragonus swanii, the rockhead, deep-pitted poacher or deep-pitted sea-poacher, is a species of fish in the family Agonidae. It was described by Franz Steindachner in 1876, originally in the genus Hypsagonus. It is found in the eastern Pacific Ocean from Alaska to Carmel Bay, California down to depths of 18 metres. It can also inhabit the intertidal zone. Males can reach a maximum total length of 8.9 centimetres.

== Cranial pit and hypothesized sound production ==
Bothragonus swanii has a prominent bowl-shaped cranial pit on the top of its skull, roughly the size of its brain. Researchers hypothesize that the pit is an acoustic organ for communication in the species' noisy intertidal habitat.

The species epithet "swanii" refers to James G. Swan of Port Townsend, Washington. The rockhead spawns nearshore, during the months of January–May in the California Current region. Its diet consists of benthic shrimp and crabs.
