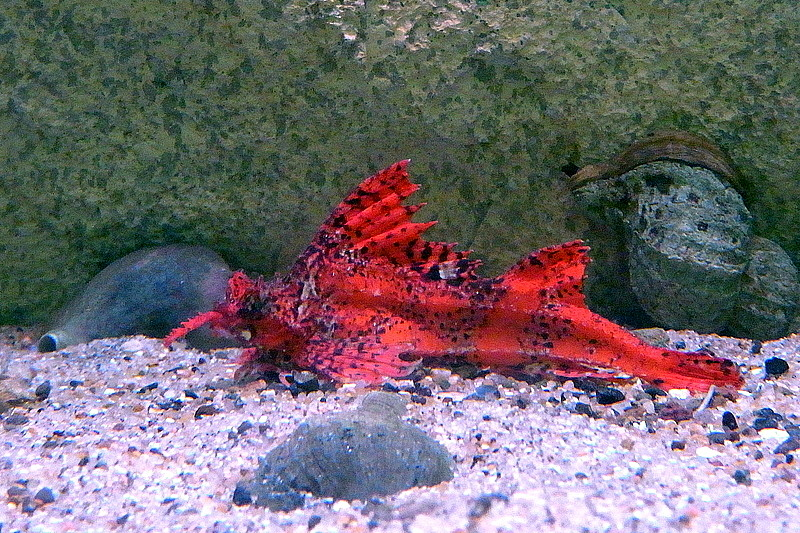

Scientific classification
- Domain: Eukaryota
- Kingdom: Animalia
- Phylum: Chordata
- Class: Actinopterygii
- Order: Perciformes
- Suborder: Cottoidei
- Family: Agonidae
- Genus: Agonomalus
- Species: A. proboscidalis

Binomial name
- Agonomalus proboscidalis (Valenciennes, 1858)

Synonyms
- Aspidophorus proboscidalis Valenciennes, 1858; Hypsagonus proboscidalis (Valenciennes, 1858)

= Agonomalus proboscidalis =

Species of fish

Agonomalus proboscidalis is a fish in the family Agonidae. It was described by Achille Valenciennes in 1858, originally under the genus Aspidophorus (now Agonus). It is a marine, polar water-dwelling fish which is known from the northwestern Pacific Ocean, including northern Japan, the Sea of Japan, and the Sea of Okhotsk. It is known to dwell at a depth range of 20 to 102 metres (66 to 335 ft). Males can reach a maximum total length of 20 centimetres (7.9 in).

Agonomalus proboscidalis is a commercial aquarium fish.
