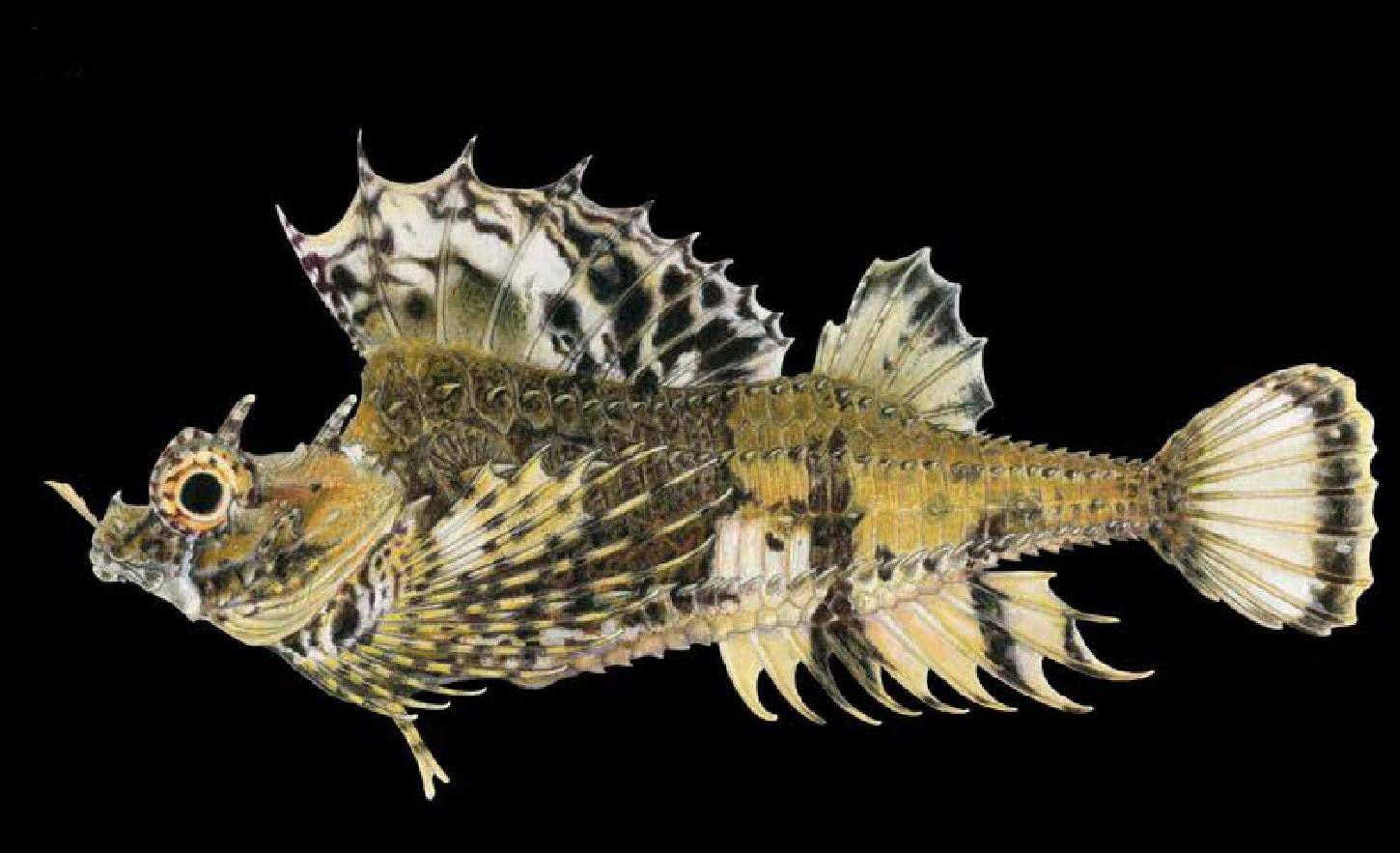

Scientific classification
- Kingdom: Animalia
- Phylum: Chordata
- Class: Actinopterygii
- Division: Teleostei
- Order: Perciformes
- Suborder: Cottoidei
- Family: Agonidae
- Genus: Hypsagonus
- Species: H. quadricornis

Binomial name
- Hypsagonus quadricornis (Valenciennes, 1829)

Synonyms
- Aspidophorus quadricornis Valenciennes, 1829

= Fourhorn poacher =

Species of fish

The fourhorn poacher (Hypsagonus quadricornis), also known as the four-horned sea-poacher, is a fish in the family Agonidae. It was described by Achille Valenciennes in 1829, originally under the genus Aspidophorus (now Agonus). It is a marine, temperate water-dwelling fish which is known from the northern Pacific Ocean, including the Sea of Okhotsk, the Sea of Japan, the Bering Sea, the Kuril Islands, and Washington, USA. It is non-migratory, and dwells at a depth range of 0 to 452 metres (0 to 1,483 ft), most often at around 100 to 150 metres (330 to 490 ft). It inhabits sediments of sand and gravel. Males can reach a maximum total length of 12 centimetres (4.7 in), but more commonly reach a TL of 10 centimetres (3.9 in). The maximum recorded weight is 24 grams (0.053 lb), and the maximum recorded age is 7 years.

The fourhorn poacher is preyed on by Hippoglossus stenolepis. Its own diet consists of crustaceans including shrimp, crabs, isopods, amphipods, and ostracods, as well as bony fish, gastropods, and polychaetes.
