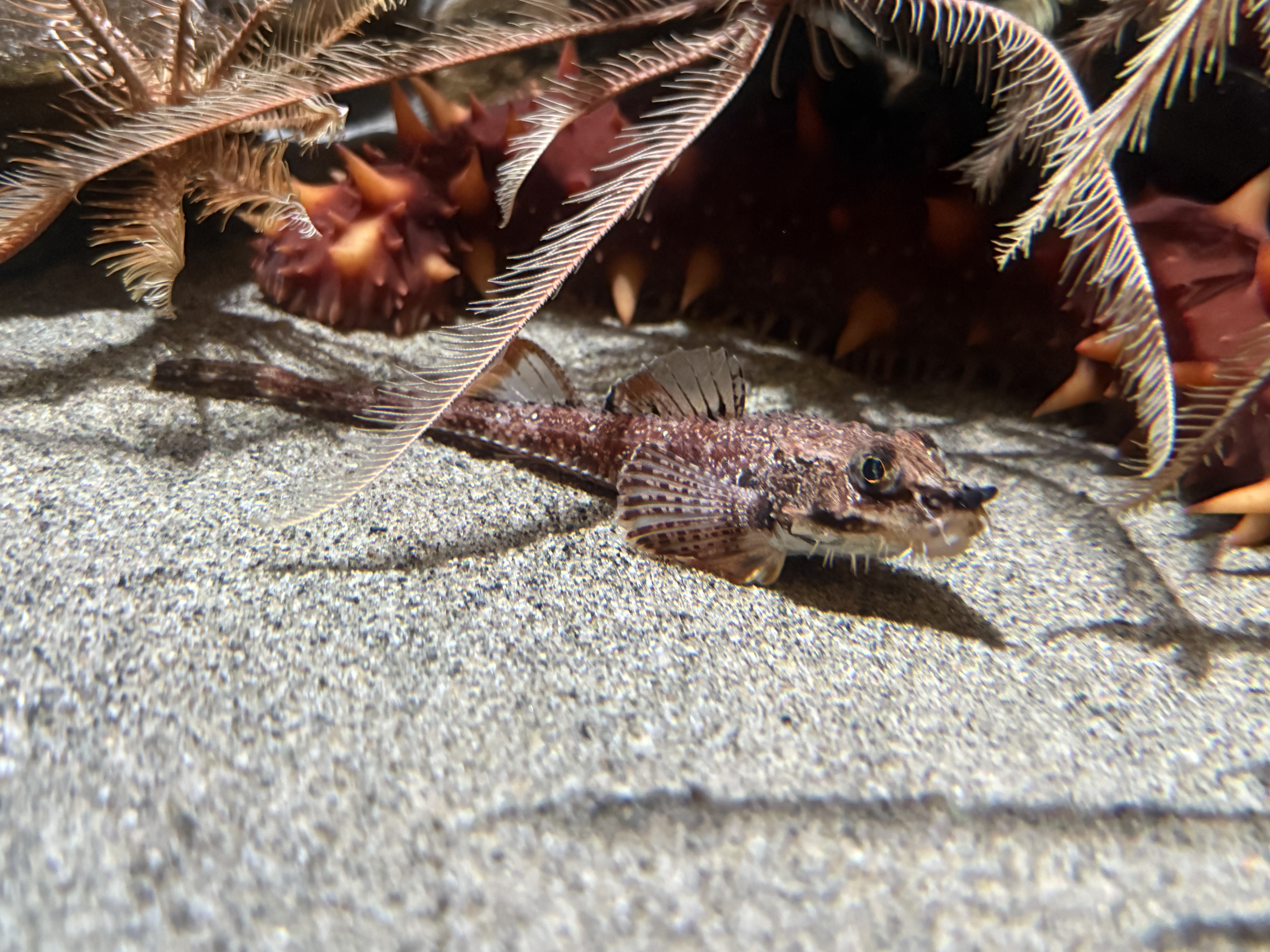

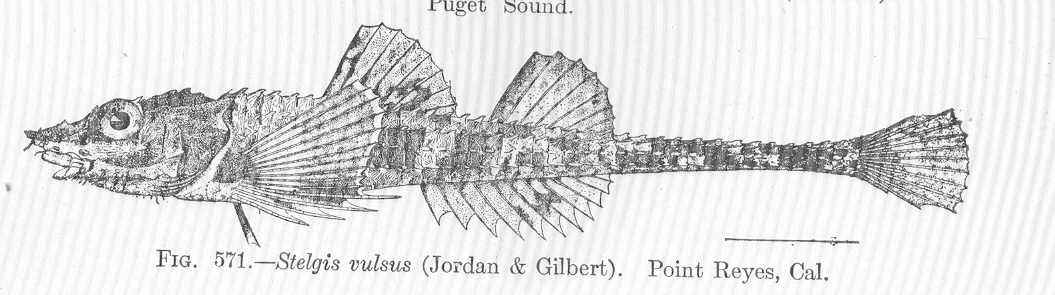

Scientific classification
- Kingdom: Animalia
- Phylum: Chordata
- Class: Actinopterygii
- Order: Perciformes
- Suborder: Cottoidei
- Family: Agonidae
- Genus: Agonopsis
- Species: A. vulsa

Binomial name
- Agonopsis vulsa (D. S. Jordan & C. H. Gilbert, 1880)

Synonyms
- Agonus vulsus Jordan & Gilbert, 1880; Podothecus vulsus (Jordan & Gilbert, 1880); Stelgis vulsus (Jordan & Gilbert, 1880); Averruncus emmelane Jordan & Starks, 1895; Agonopsis emmelane (Jordan & Starks, 1895); Xystes axinophrys Jordan & Starks, 1895

= Northern spearnose poacher =

Species of fish

The northern spearnose poacher (Agonopsis vulsa), also known as the window-tailed sea-poacher or the windowtail poacher, is a fish in the family Agonidae. It was described by David Starr Jordan and Charles Henry Gilbert in 1880, originally under the genus Agonus. It is a marine, temperate water-dwelling fish which is known from the eastern Pacific Ocean, including southeastern Alaska to southern California, USA. It dwells at a depth range of 0 to 163 metres (0 to 535 ft). Males can reach a maximum total length of 20 centimetres (7.9 in).

The northern spearnose poacher is sometimes used as a public aquarium fish.
