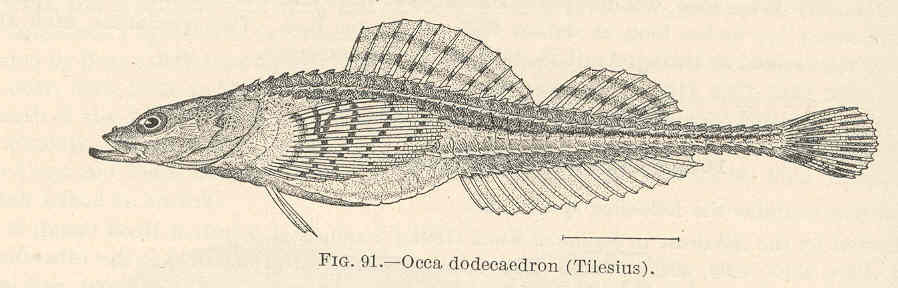

Scientific classification
- Domain: Eukaryota
- Kingdom: Animalia
- Phylum: Chordata
- Class: Actinopterygii
- Order: Perciformes
- Suborder: Cottoidei
- Family: Agonidae
- Genus: Occella
- Species: O. dodecaedron

Binomial name
- Occella dodecaedron (Tilesius, 1813)

Synonyms
- Agonus dodecaedron Tilesius, 1813; Brachyopsis dodecaedron (Tilesius, 1813); Occa dodecaedron (Tilesius, 1813); Ocella dodecaedron (Tilesius, 1813); Phalangistes loricatus Pallas, 1814

= Bering poacher =

Species of fish

The Bering poacher (Occella dodecaedron) is a fish in the family Agonidae. It was described by Wilhelm Gottlieb Tilesius von Tilenau in 1813, originally in the genus Agonus. It is a marine, temperate water-dwelling fish which is known from the northern Pacific Ocean, including Kotzebue Sound, the northern Sea of Japan, the Sea of Okhotsk, Akun Island, and the Gulf of Alaska. It dwells at a depth range of 0–325 metres. Males can reach a maximum standard length of 21.6 centimetres.

The Bering poacher is preyed on by Megalocottus platycephalus. Its own diet consists of planktonic and benthic crustaceans including mysids and amphipods.
