= Tubenose poacher =

Scientific classification
- Kingdom: Animalia
- Phylum: Chordata
- Class: Actinopterygii
- Order: Perciformes
- Suborder: Cottoidei
- Family: Agonidae
- Subfamily: Brachyopsinae
- Genus: Pallasina; Cramer, 1895
- Species: P. barbata

Binomial name
- Pallasina barbata (Steindachner, 1876)

Synonyms
- Siphagonus barbatus Steindachner, 1876

Species of fish

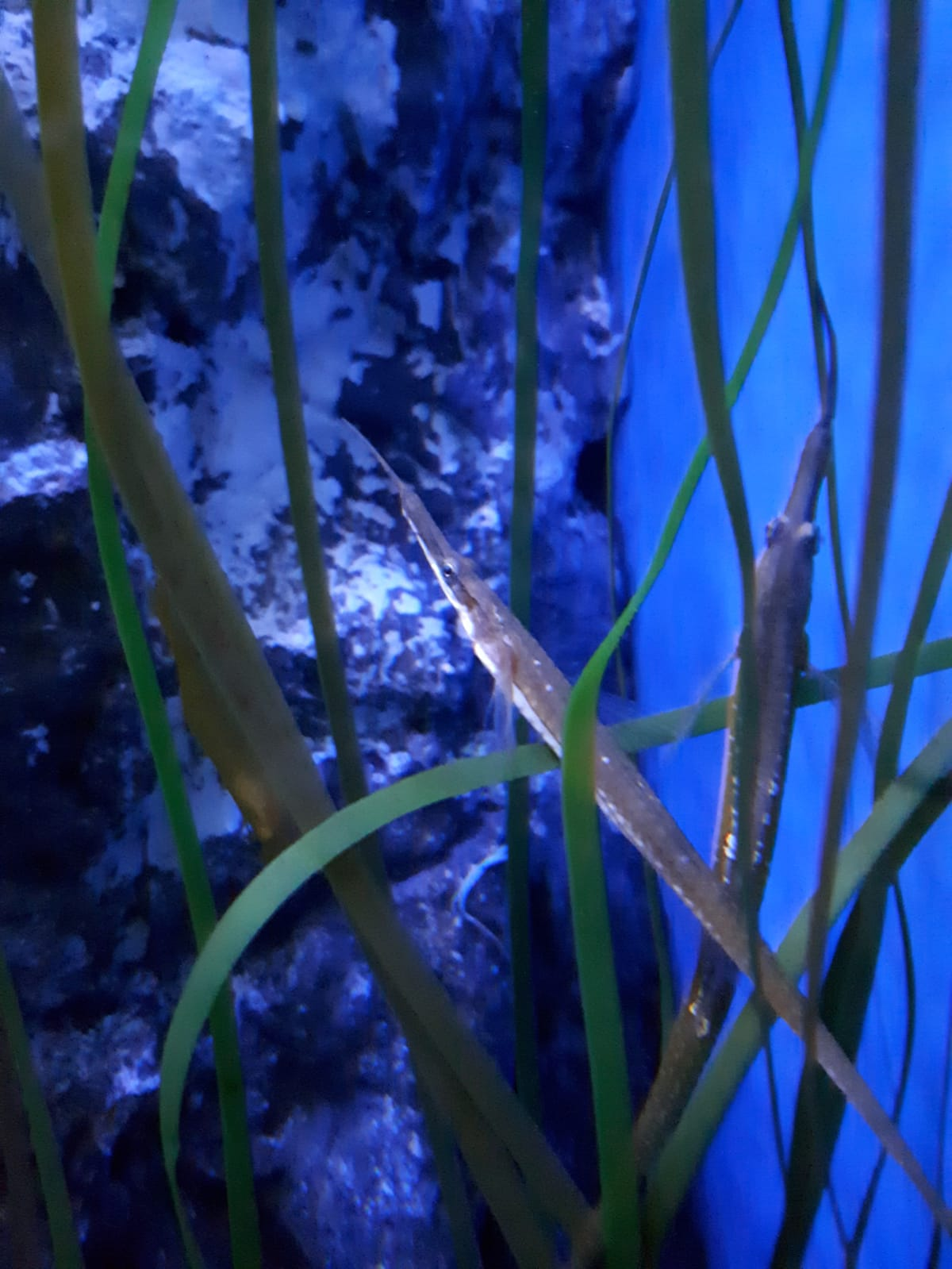
Pallasina barbata in an aquarium

The tubenose poacher (Pallasina barbata) is a species of poacher native to the northern Pacific Ocean. This species occurs at depths of from 0 to 105 metres (0 to 340 ft). This species grows to a length of 17 centimetres (6.7 in) TL.
