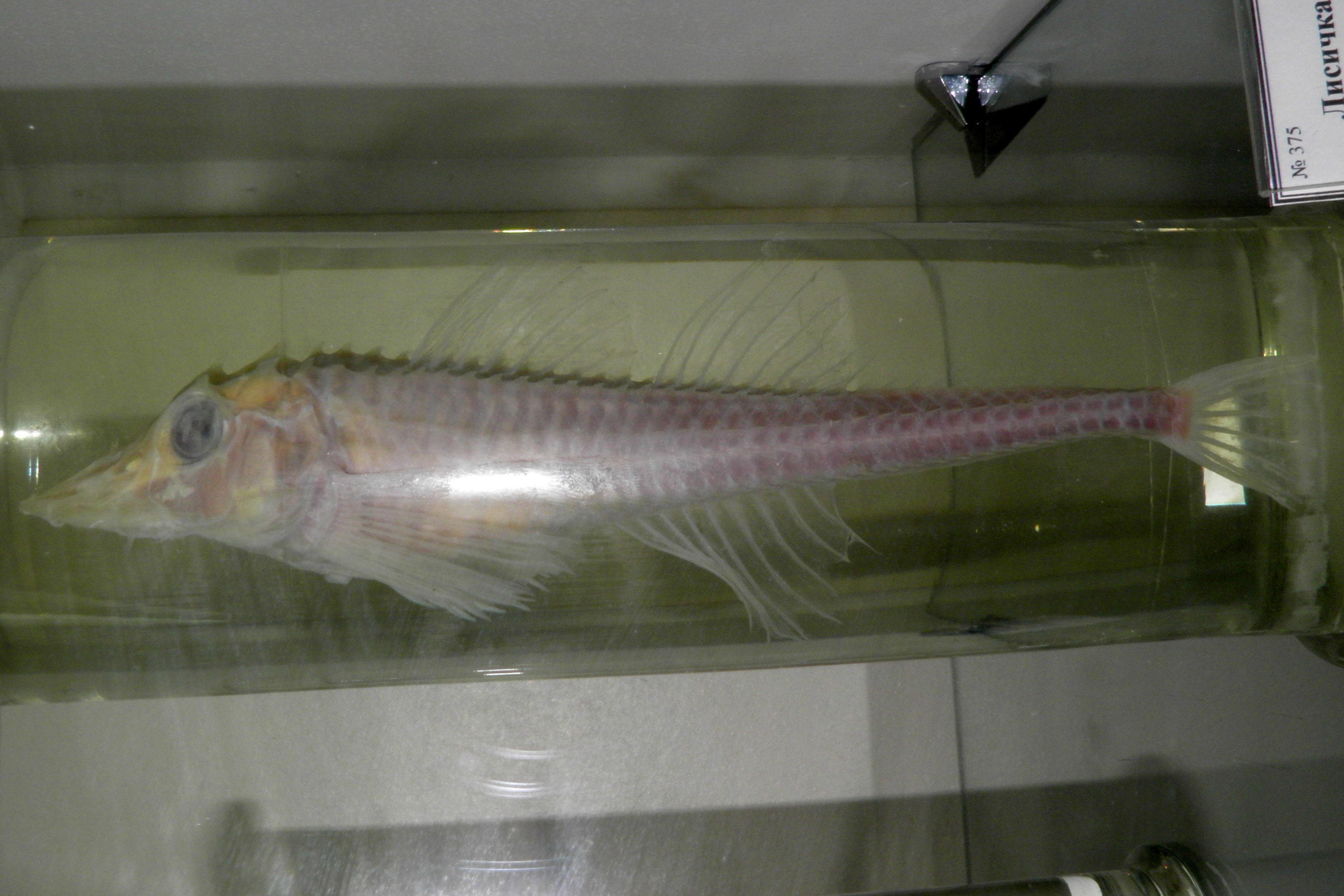

Scientific classification
- Kingdom: Animalia
- Phylum: Chordata
- Class: Actinopterygii
- Order: Perciformes
- Suborder: Cottoidei
- Family: Agonidae
- Subfamily: Agoninae
- Genus: Freemanichthys; Kanayama, 1991
- Species: F. thompsoni

Binomial name
- Freemanichthys thompsoni (D. S. Jordan & C. H. Gilbert, 1898)

= Freemanichthys =

Species of fish

Freemanichthys is a monospecific genus of marine ray-finned fish belonging to the family Agonidae. This species is found in the northwestern Pacific Ocean. It is found at depths of from 10 to 300 metres (33 to 984 ft). This species grows to a length of 22 centimetres (8.7 in) TL. This only species in the genus is Freemanichthys thompsoni.
