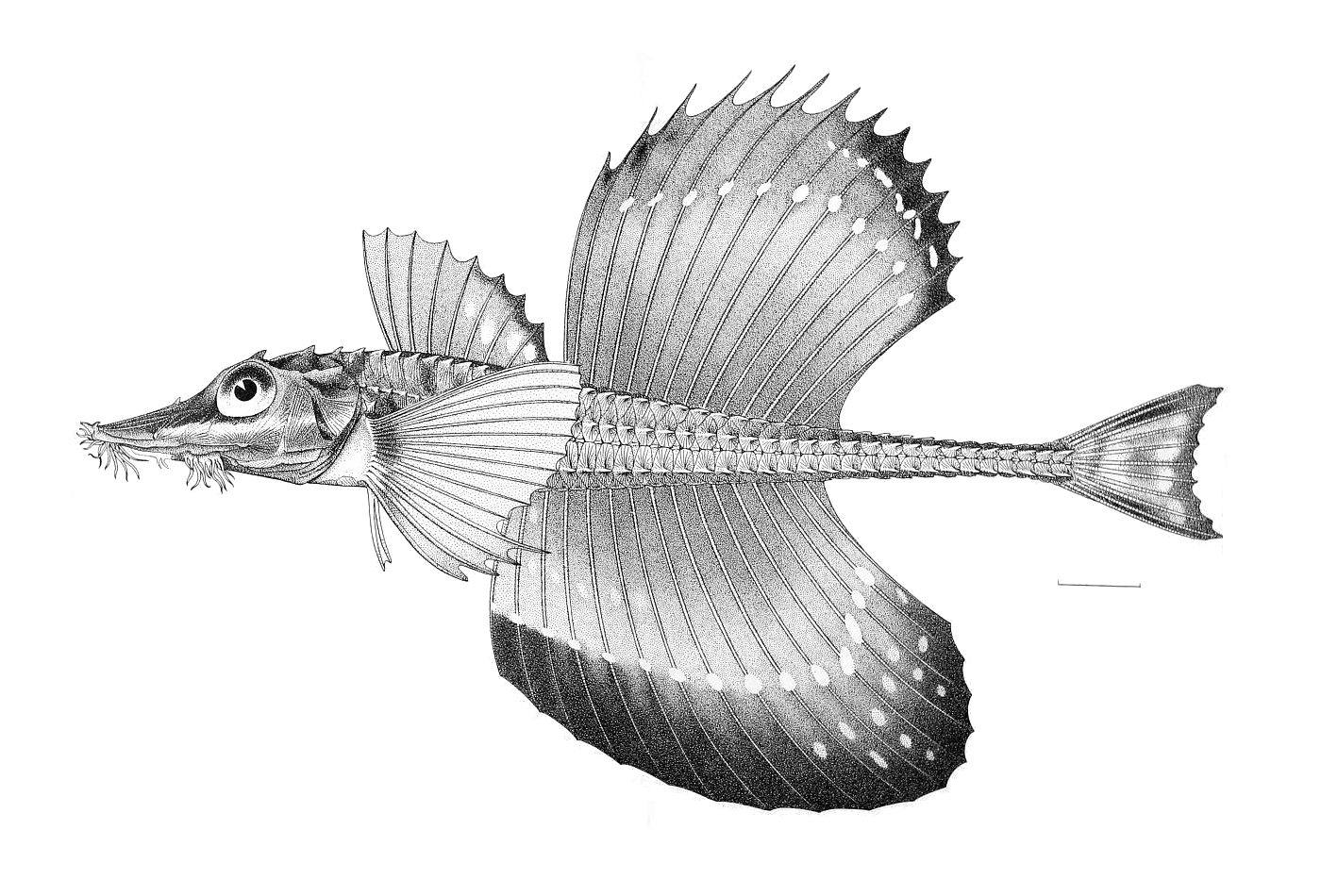

Scientific classification
- Kingdom: Animalia
- Phylum: Chordata
- Class: Actinopterygii
- Order: Perciformes
- Suborder: Cottoidei
- Family: Agonidae
- Subfamily: Agoninae
- Genus: Podothecus; T. N. Gill, 1861

Type species
- Podothecus peristethus Gill, 1861

Synonyms
- Draciscus Jordan & Snyder, 1901; Paragonus Gill, 1861; Paragonus Guichenot, 1869

= Podothecus =

Genus of fishes

Podothecus is a genus of poachers native to the northern Pacific Ocean.

== Species ==
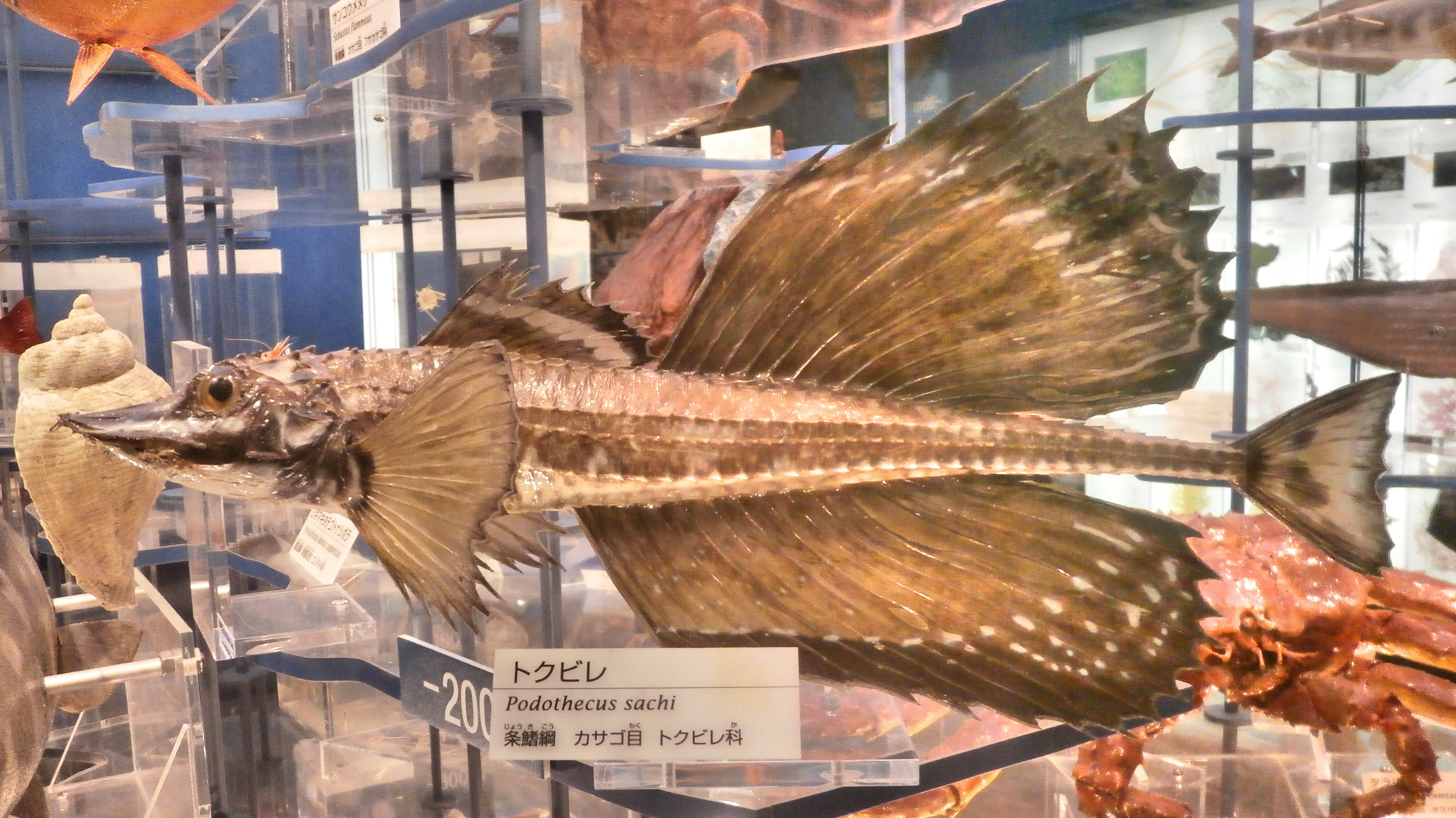
Stuffed specimen of Podothecus sachi, exhibited in the National Museum of Nature and Science, Tokyo, Japan.

There are currently five recognized species in this genus:

- Podothecus accipenserinus (Tilesius, 1813) (sturgeon poacher)
- Podothecus hamlini D. S. Jordan & C. H. Gilbert, 1898
- Podothecus sachi (D. S. Jordan & Snyder, 1901)
- Podothecus sturioides (Guichenot, 1869)
- Podothecus veternus D. S. Jordan & Starks, 1895
