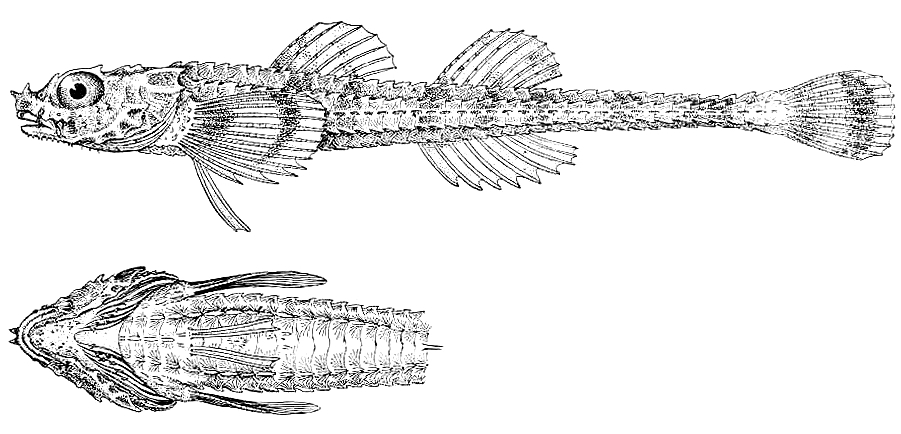

Scientific classification
- Domain: Eukaryota
- Kingdom: Animalia
- Phylum: Chordata
- Class: Actinopterygii
- Order: Perciformes
- Suborder: Cottoidei
- Family: Agonidae
- Genus: Agonopsis
- Species: A. sterletus

Binomial name
- Agonopsis sterletus (Gilbert, 1898)

Synonyms
- Averruncus sterletus Gilbert, 1898

= Southern spearnose poacher =

Species of fish

The southern spearnose poacher (Agonopsis sterletus) is a fish in the family Agonidae. It was described by Charles Henry Gilbert in 1898, originally under the genus Averruncus. It is a marine, subtropical fish which is known from the eastern central Pacific Ocean, including California, USA to Baja California, Mexico. It dwells at a depth range of 42 to 91 metres (138 to 299 ft), and inhabits soft benthic sediments. Males can reach a maximum total length of 15 centimetres (5.9 in).
