= Percis matsuii =

Conservation status
- Least Concern (IUCN 3.1)

Scientific classification
- Kingdom: Animalia
- Phylum: Chordata
- Class: Actinopterygii
- Order: Perciformes
- Suborder: Cottoidei
- Family: Agonidae
- Genus: Percis
- Species: P. matsuii

Binomial name
- Percis matsuii Matsubara, 1936

Species of fish

Percis matsuii is a fish in the family Agonidae. It was described by Matsubara in 1936. It is a marine, deep water-dwelling fish which is known from southern Japan, in the northwestern Pacific Ocean. It dwells at a depth range of 200 to 500 metres (660 to 1,640 ft), and inhabits sand and mud sediments. Males can reach a maximum standard length of 15 centimetres (5.9 in).

Due to its moderately wide distribution in its region, and due to a lack of interest from fisheries, the IUCN redlist currently lists P. matsuii as Least Concern.
