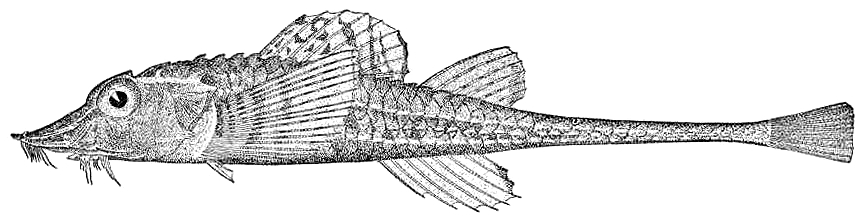

Scientific classification
- Domain: Eukaryota
- Kingdom: Animalia
- Phylum: Chordata
- Class: Actinopterygii
- Order: Perciformes
- Suborder: Cottoidei
- Family: Agonidae
- Genus: Podothecus
- Species: P. accipenserinus

Binomial name
- Podothecus accipenserinus (Tilesius, 1813)

Synonyms
- Agonus accipenserinus Tilesius, 1813; Phalangistes accipenserinus (Tilesius, 1813); Phalangistes acipenserinus Pallas, 1814; Podothecus peristethus Gill, 1861

= Sturgeon poacher =

Species of fish

The sturgeon poacher (Podothecus accipenserinus), also known as the sturgeon-like sea-poacher in Canada, is a fish in the family Agonidae. It was described by Wilhelm Gottlieb Tilesius von Tilenau in 1813. It is a marine, temperate water-dwelling fish which is known from the northern Pacific Ocean, including the western Bering Sea, Cape Navarin, the Commander Islands, the Sea of Okhotsk, the Aleutian Islands, and northern California, USA. It dwells at a depth range of 2 to 710 metres (6.6 to 2,329.4 ft), and inhabits soft benthic sediments. Males can reach a maximum total length of 30.5 centimetres (12.0 in).

The Sturgeon poacher's diet consists of bony fish, crustaceans such as amphipods, copepods and shrimp, and annelid worms.
