= Occella kuronumai =

Scientific classification
- Domain: Eukaryota
- Kingdom: Animalia
- Phylum: Chordata
- Class: Actinopterygii
- Order: Perciformes
- Suborder: Cottoidei
- Family: Agonidae
- Genus: Occella
- Species: O. kuronumai

Binomial name
- Occella kuronumai (Freeman, 1951)

Synonyms
- Occa kuronumai Freeman, 1951

Species of fish

Occella kuronumai is a fish in the family Agonidae. It was described by Harry Wyman Freeman in 1951, originally in the genus Occa. It is a marine, temperate water-dwelling fish which is known from the coast of northern Honshu, Japan, in the Sea of Japan in the northwestern Pacific Ocean.
