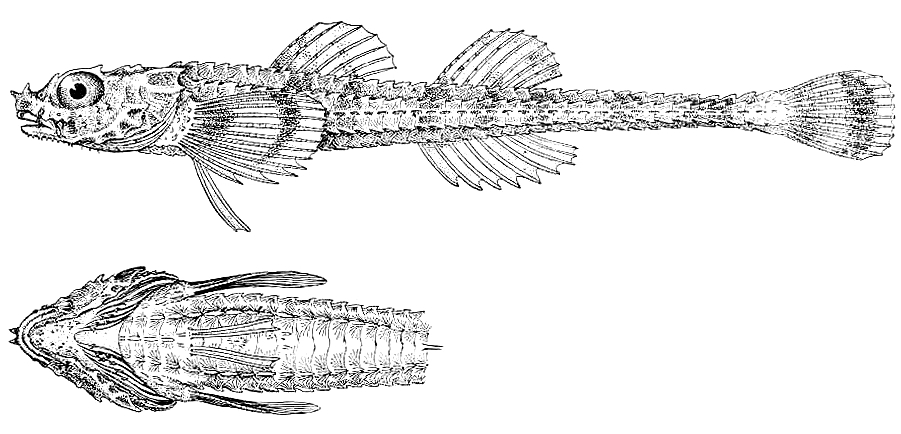
- Agonopsis sterletus

Scientific classification
- Kingdom: Animalia
- Phylum: Chordata
- Class: Actinopterygii
- Division: Teleostei
- Order: Perciformes
- Suborder: Cottoidei
- Family: Agonidae
- Subfamily: Agoninae
- Genus: Agonopsis; T. N. Gill, 1861

Type species
- Aspidophorus chiloensis Jenyns, 1840

= Agonopsis =

Genus of fishes

Agonopsis is a genus of poachers native to the Pacific Ocean.

== Species ==
There are currently four recognized species in this genus:

- Agonopsis asperoculis W. F. Thompson, 1916
- Agonopsis chiloensis (Jenyns, 1840) (Snailfish)
- Agonopsis sterletus (C. H. Gilbert, 1898) (Southern spearnose poacher)
- Agonopsis vulsa (D. S. Jordan & C. H. Gilbert, 1880) (Northern spearnose poacher)
