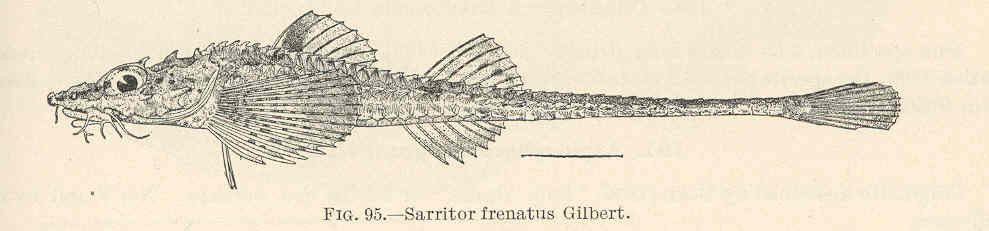

Scientific classification
- Kingdom: Animalia
- Phylum: Chordata
- Class: Actinopterygii
- Division: Teleostei
- Order: Perciformes
- Suborder: Cottoidei
- Family: Agonidae
- Genus: Leptagonus
- Species: L. frenatus

Binomial name
- Leptagonus frenatus (Gilbert, 1896)

Synonyms
- Odontopyxis frenatus Gilbert, 1896; Sarritor frenatus (Gilbert, 1896); Sarritor frenatus frenatus (Gilbert, 1896); Sarritor frenatus occidentalis Lindberg & Andriashev, 1937

= Sawback poacher =

Species of fish

The sawback poacher (Leptagonus frenatus) is a species of fish in the family Agonidae. It was described by Charles Henry Gilbert in 1896, originally under the genus Odontopyxis. It is a marine, temperate water-dwelling fish which is known from the northern Pacific Ocean, including Japan, the Gulf of Anadyr, the Bering Sea, the Aleutian chain, and British Columbia, Canada. It dwells at a depth range of 18 to 975 metres (59 to 3,199 ft), and inhabits soft sediments. Males can reach a maximum total length of 27 centimetres (11 in).

The sawback poacher is preyed on by bony fish including the Pacific cod, the Kamchatka flounder, the Pacific halibut, the Aleutian skate, and Careproctus cyclocephalus. Its own diet consists of fish, fish eggs, fish offal, amphipods, euphausiids, isopods, shrimp, and polychaetes.
