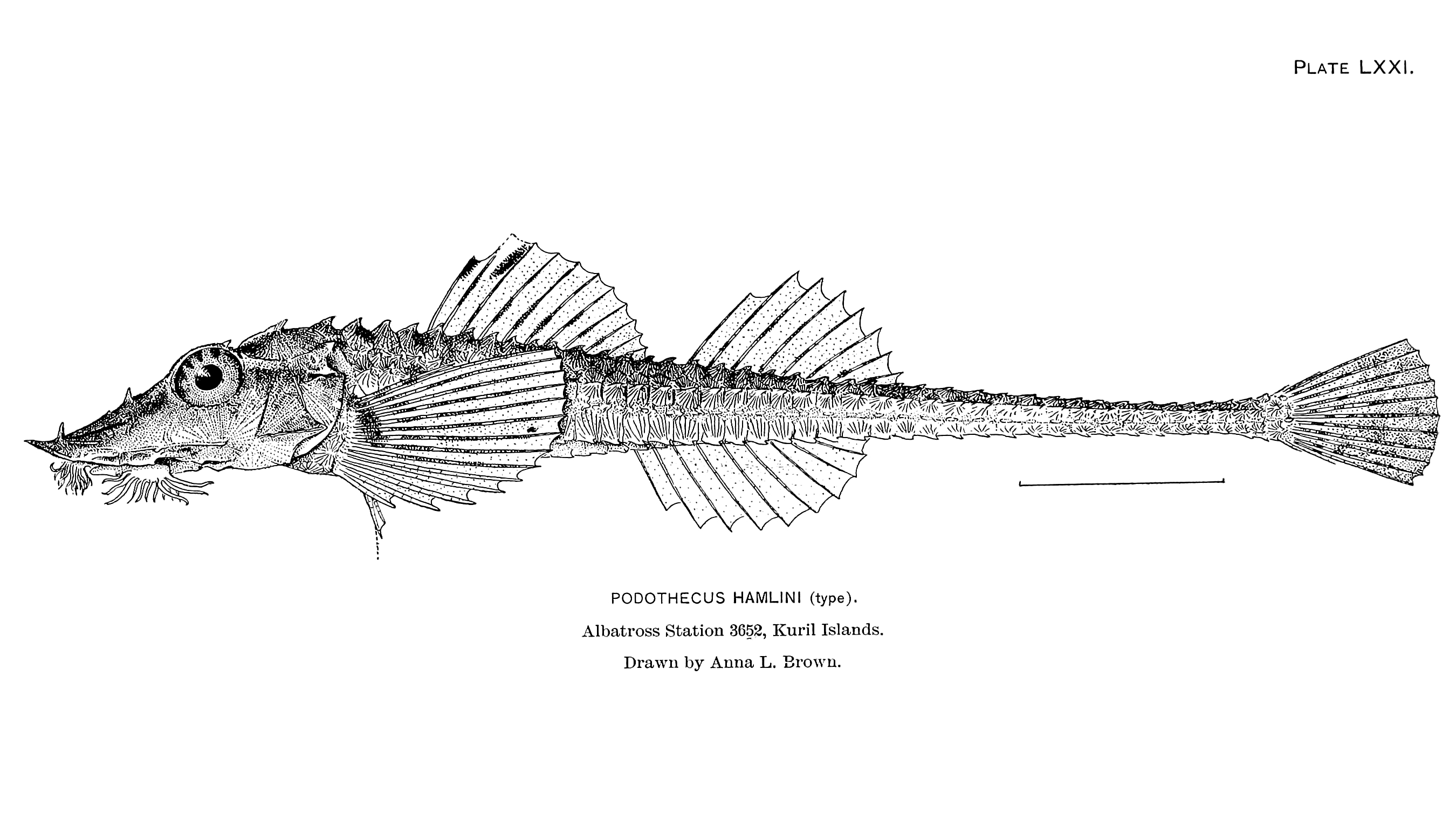

Scientific classification
- Domain: Eukaryota
- Kingdom: Animalia
- Phylum: Chordata
- Class: Actinopterygii
- Order: Perciformes
- Suborder: Cottoidei
- Family: Agonidae
- Genus: Podothecus
- Species: P. hamlini

Binomial name
- Podothecus hamlini Jordan & Gilbert, 1898

= Podothecus hamlini =

Species of fish

Podothecus hamlini is a fish in the family Agonidae. It was described by David Starr Jordan and Charles Henry Gilbert in 1898.
