= Occella iburia =

Scientific classification
- Kingdom: Animalia
- Phylum: Chordata
- Class: Actinopterygii
- Order: Perciformes
- Suborder: Cottoidei
- Family: Agonidae
- Genus: Occella
- Species: O. iburia

Binomial name
- Occella iburia (Jordan & Starks, 1904)

Synonyms
- Occa iburia Jordan & Starks, 1904

Species of fish

Occella iburia is a fish in the family Agonidae. It was described by David Starr Jordan and Edwin Chapin Starks in 1904, originally in the genus Occa.

It is a marine, temperate water-dwelling fish which is known from the coast of Japan, in the northwestern Pacific Ocean.
