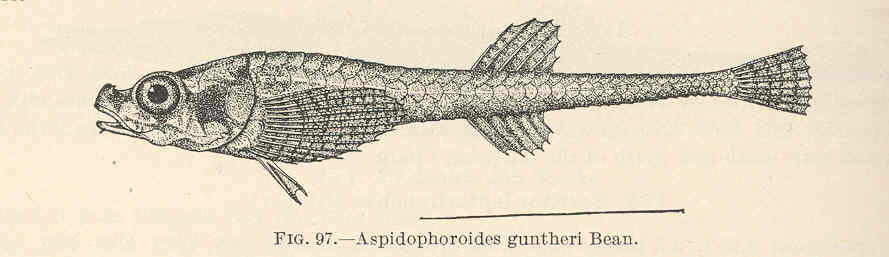

Scientific classification
- Kingdom: Animalia
- Phylum: Chordata
- Class: Actinopterygii
- Order: Perciformes
- Suborder: Cottoidei
- Family: Agonidae
- Genus: Aspidophoroides
- Species: A. olrikii

Binomial name
- Aspidophoroides olrikii Lütken, 1877

Synonyms
- Ulcina olrikii (Lütken, 1877); Aspidophoroides olriki Lütken, 1877; Ulcina olriki (Lütken, 1877); Aspidophoroides guentherii Bean, 1885; Aspidophoroides guntheri Bean, 1885; Aspidophoroides güntherii Bean, 1885; Ulcina güntheri (Bean, 1885)

= Arctic alligatorfish =

Species of fish

The Arctic alligatorfish (Aspidophoroides olrikii) is a fish in the family Agonidae. It was described by C.F. Lütken in 1877. It is a marine and brackish-water dwelling fish which is known from the Arctic, the northwestern Atlantic and northwestern and northeastern Pacific Ocean, including Canada, Greenland, Siberia, the Barents Sea, the White Sea, the Kara Sea, the Chukchi Sea, the Bering Sea, the Bering Strait, and the Anadyr Gulf. It dwells at a depth range of 7–520 metres, in salinities of 30–35 ppt, and leads a benthic lifestyle, inhabiting sand and mud bottoms. It mostly lives in temperatures below 0 °C, but on rare occasions has been found in temperatures of 2–3 °C. Males can reach a maximum total length of 8.6 centimetres.

The diet of the Arctic alligatorfish consists of amphipods such as Dyopedos porrectus and Paradulichia typica, bivalves such as Macoma calcarea, ostracods, isopods, and nemertine worms.
