= Occella kasawae =

Scientific classification
- Kingdom: Animalia
- Phylum: Chordata
- Class: Actinopterygii
- Order: Perciformes
- Suborder: Cottoidei
- Family: Agonidae
- Genus: Occella
- Species: O. kasawae

Binomial name
- Occella kasawae (Jordan & Hubbs, 1925)

Synonyms
- Iburiella kasawae Jordan & Hubbs, 1925; Occella kasawai (Jordan & Hubbs, 1925)

Species of fish

Occella kasawae is a fish in the family Agonidae. It was described by David Starr Jordan and Carl Leavitt Hubbs, originally in the genus Iburiella. It is a marine, temperate water-dwelling fish which is known from the northwestern Pacific Ocean, including the southern Okhotsk Sea and Hokkaido, Japan. It dwells at a depth range of 12–140 metres.
