= Alligator fish =

Alligatorfish may refer to one of two species:

- The alligator gar, sometimes known as the alligator fish
- The alligatorfish, Aspidophoroides monopterygius, a small fish found in coastal waters
