= Agonopsis chiloensis =

Scientific classification
- Kingdom: Animalia
- Phylum: Chordata
- Class: Actinopterygii
- Order: Perciformes
- Suborder: Cottoidei
- Family: Agonidae
- Genus: Agonopsis
- Species: A. chiloensis

Binomial name
- Agonopsis chiloensis (Jenyns, 1840)

Synonyms
- Aspidophorus chiloensis Jenyns, 1840; Aspidophorus niger Krøyer, 1845

Species of fish

Agonopsis chiloensis, the snailfish, is a fish in the family Agonidae. It was described by Leonard Jenyns in 1840. It is a subtropical, marine fish which is known from the southeastern Pacific and southwestern Atlantic Ocean, including Chile, Patagonia, and Argentina. It is known to dwell at a depth of 3–400 metres. Males can reach a maximum standard length of 12.5 centimetres.

Agonopsis chiloensis is preyed upon by Cottoperca gobio, imperial shag, Pinguipes chilensis, and the narrowmouthed catshark. It is of no commercial interest.
