= Agonopsis asperoculis =

Scientific classification
- Kingdom: Animalia
- Phylum: Chordata
- Class: Actinopterygii
- Division: Teleostei
- Order: Perciformes
- Suborder: Cottoidei
- Family: Agonidae
- Genus: Agonopsis
- Species: A. asperoculis

Binomial name
- Agonopsis asperoculis Thompson, 1916

Species of fish

Agonopsis asperoculis is a fish in the family Agonidae. It was described by William Francis Thompson in 1916. It is a subtropical, marine fish which is known from off the coasts of Argentina and the Falkland Islands, in the southwestern Atlantic Ocean. It is known to dwell at a depth range of 18–20 metres.
