= Anoplagonus occidentalis =

Scientific classification
- Domain: Eukaryota
- Kingdom: Animalia
- Phylum: Chordata
- Class: Actinopterygii
- Order: Perciformes
- Suborder: Cottoidei
- Family: Agonidae
- Genus: Anoplagonus
- Species: A. occidentalis

Binomial name
- Anoplagonus occidentalis Lindberg, 1950

Species of fish

Anoplagonus occidentalis is a fish in the family Agonidae. It was described by Georgii Ustinovich Lindberg in 1950. It is a marine fish which dwells in temperate waters, and is known from Japan, in the northwestern Pacific Ocean. It dwells at a depth range of 40–120 metres. Males can reach a maximum standard length of 10 centimetres.
