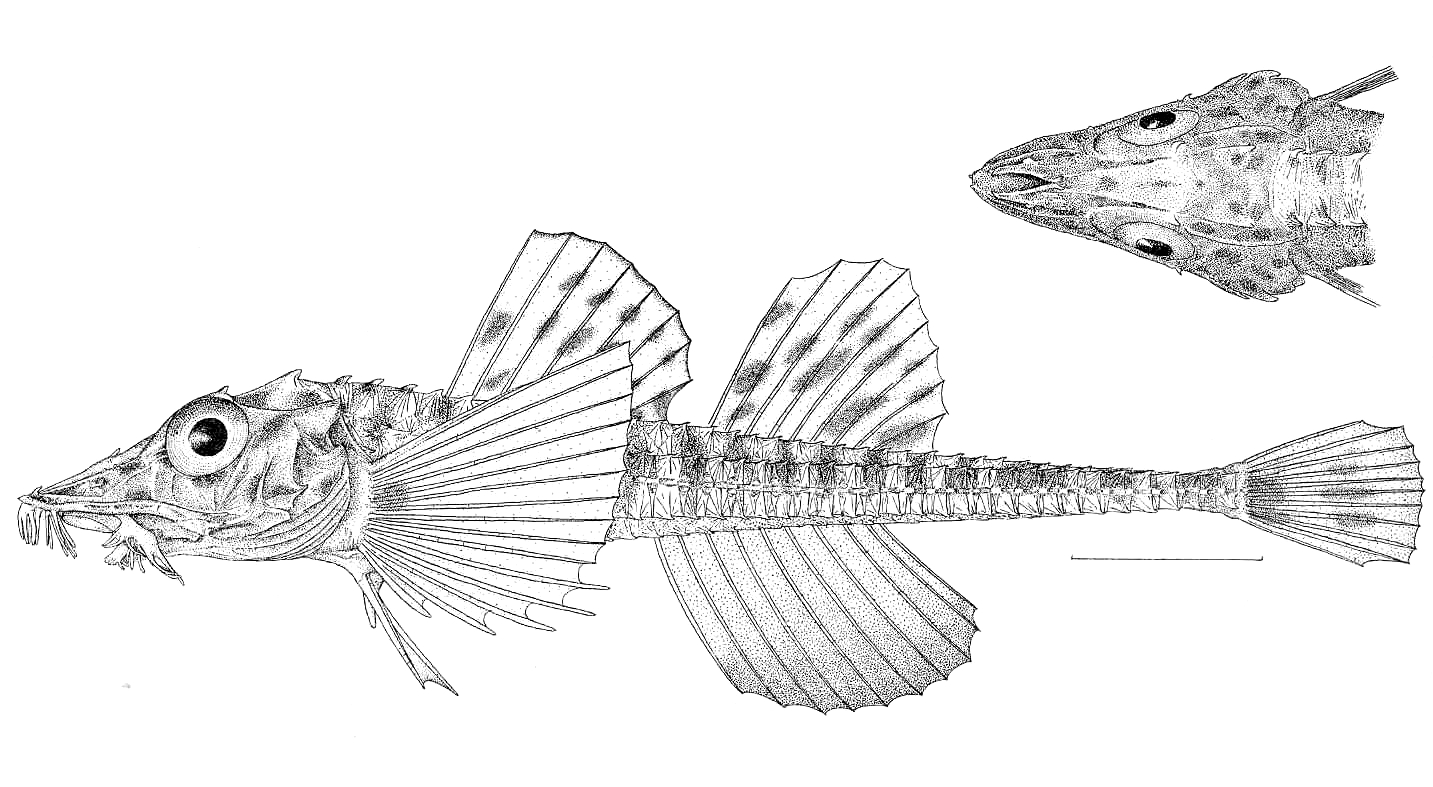

Scientific classification
- Kingdom: Animalia
- Phylum: Chordata
- Class: Actinopterygii
- Order: Perciformes
- Suborder: Cottoidei
- Family: Agonidae
- Genus: Podothecus
- Species: P. sturioides

Binomial name
- Podothecus sturioides (Guichenot, 1869)

= Podothecus sturioides =

Species of fish

Podothecus sturioides is a fish in the family Agonidae. It was described by Alphonse Guichenot in 1869.
