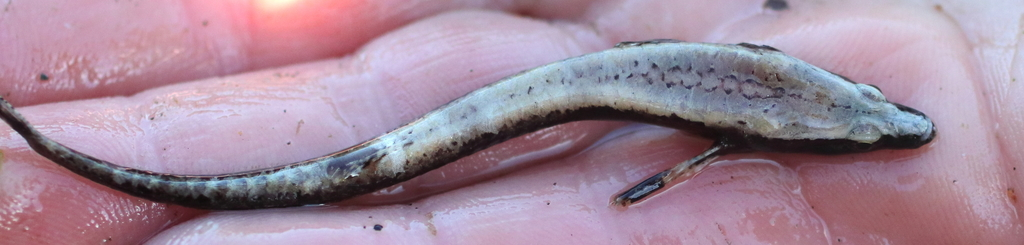

Scientific classification
- Domain: Eukaryota
- Kingdom: Animalia
- Phylum: Chordata
- Class: Actinopterygii
- Order: Perciformes
- Suborder: Cottoidei
- Family: Agonidae
- Genus: Anoplagonus
- Species: A. inermis

Binomial name
- Anoplagonus inermis (Günther, 1860)

Synonyms
- Aspidophoroides inermis Günther, 1860

= Smooth alligatorfish =

Species of fish

the smooth alligatorfish (Anoplagonus inermis), also known as the smooth poacher or the smooth sea-poacher,) is a fish in the family Agonidae. It was described by Albert Günther in 1860. It is a marine fish which dwells in temperate waters, and is known from the northern Pacific Ocean, including California, USA, and possibly Korea. It dwells at a depth range of 8–102 metres, usually around rocks. Males can reach a maximum total length of 15 centimetres.

The smooth alligatorfish is preyed upon by the Pacific halibut (Hippoglossus stenolepis). It is often caught by shrimp trawlers.
