= Hypsagonus corniger =

Scientific classification
- Domain: Eukaryota
- Kingdom: Animalia
- Phylum: Chordata
- Class: Actinopterygii
- Order: Perciformes
- Suborder: Cottoidei
- Family: Agonidae
- Genus: Hypsagonus
- Species: H. corniger

Binomial name
- Hypsagonus corniger Taranetz, 1933

Species of fish

Hypsagonus corniger is a fish in the family Agonidae. It was described by Anatoly Yakovlevich Taranetz in 1933. It is a marine, polar water-dwelling fish which is known from the southern Okhotsk Sea and the northern Sea of Japan, in the northwestern Pacific Ocean. It dwells at a depth range of 18 to 105 metres (59 to 344 ft). Males can reach a maximum total length of 10 centimetres (3.9 in).
