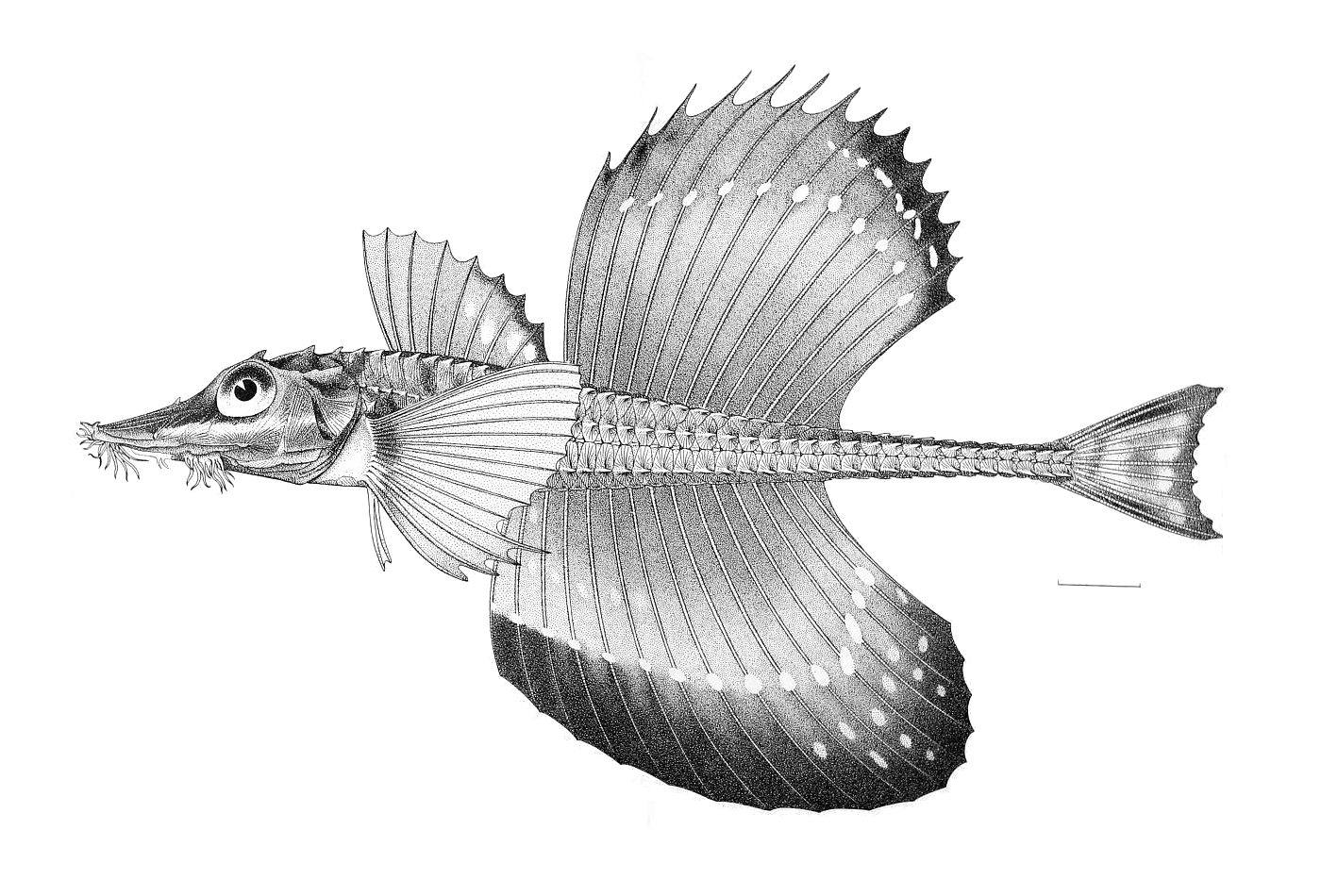

Scientific classification
- Kingdom: Animalia
- Phylum: Chordata
- Class: Actinopterygii
- Order: Perciformes
- Suborder: Cottoidei
- Family: Agonidae
- Genus: Podothecus
- Species: P. sachi

Binomial name
- Podothecus sachi (Jordan & Snyder, 1901)

= Podothecus sachi =

Species of fish

Podothecus sachi (Japanese poacher: Tokubireトクビレ) is a fish in the family Agonidae. It was described by David Starr Jordan and John Otterbein Snyder in 1901.

== Description ==
Adults tokubire can grow to 40 cm in length. Its muzzle is elongated, with the lower jaw being shorter compared to the upper part and the mouth only opens on its side. This fish can be found living at bottom of the continental shelf.
