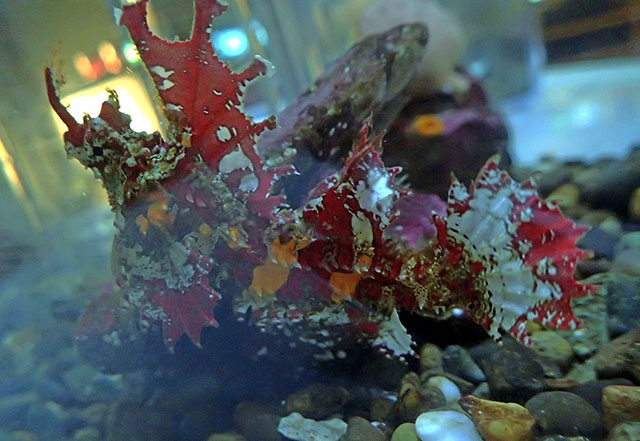

Scientific classification
- Kingdom: Animalia
- Phylum: Chordata
- Class: Actinopterygii
- Division: Teleostei
- Order: Perciformes
- Suborder: Cottoidei
- Family: Agonidae
- Genus: Hypsagonus
- Species: H. mozinoi

Binomial name
- Hypsagonus mozinoi (Wilimovsky & Wilson, 1979)

Synonyms
- Agonomalus mozinoi Wilimovsky & Wilson, 1979

= Kelp poacher =

Species of fish

The kelp poacher (Hypsagonus mozinoi) is a fish in the family Agonidae. It was described by Norman Joseph Wilimovsky and Donald Edward Wilson in 1979, originally under the genus Agonomalus. It is a marine, temperate water-dwelling fish which is known from northern British Columbia, Canada to central California, USA, in the eastern Pacific Ocean. It dwells at a maximum depth of 11 metres (40 ft), and inhabits shallow, rocky regions. It uses its pectoral fins to climb the faces of rocks and crawl on the bottom. Its body is camouflaged by a coating of sponges and seaweed. Males can reach a maximum total length of 8.9 centimetres (3.5 in).

The kelp poacher is reported to spawn from January to May, in the United States.
