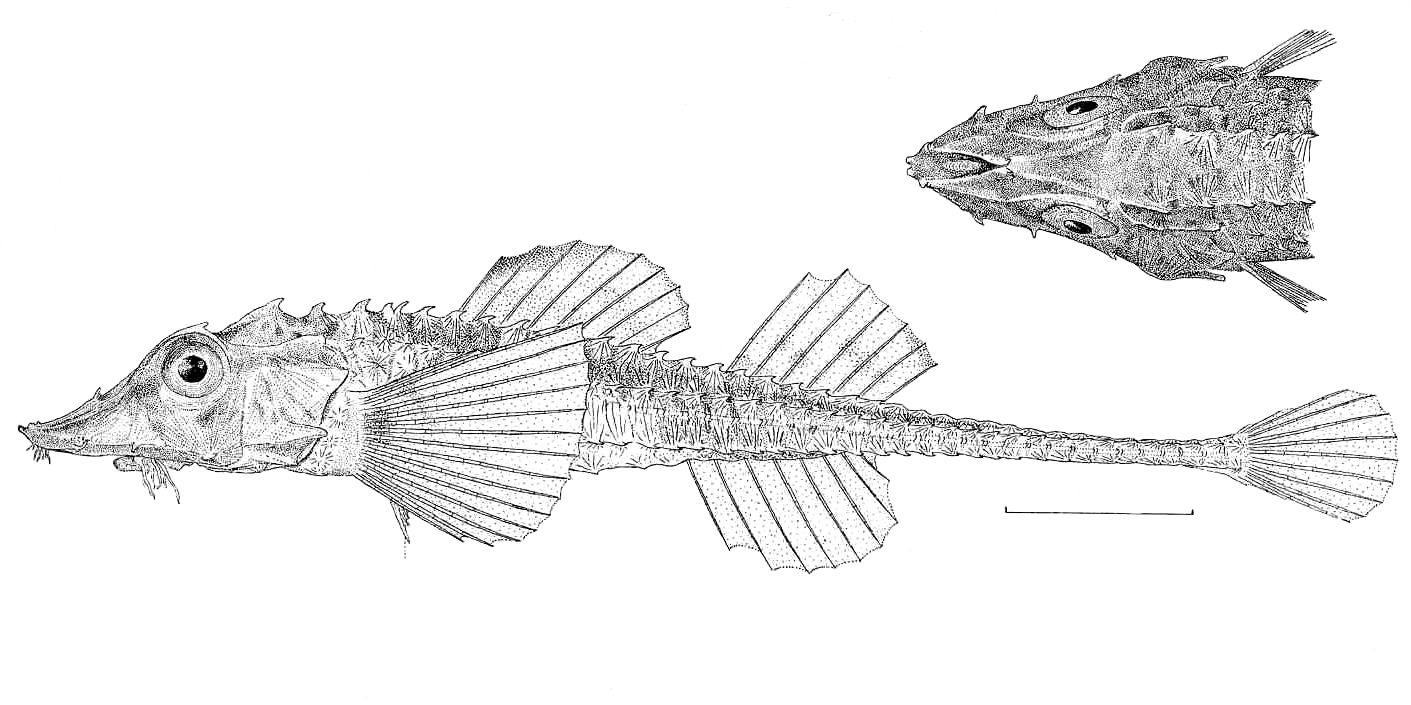

Scientific classification
- Kingdom: Animalia
- Phylum: Chordata
- Class: Actinopterygii
- Order: Perciformes
- Suborder: Cottoidei
- Family: Agonidae
- Genus: Podothecus
- Species: P. veternus

Binomial name
- Podothecus veternus Jordan & Starks, 1895

= Veteran poacher =

Species of fish

The veteran poacher (Podothecus veternus) is a fish in the family Agonidae. It was described by David Starr Jordan and Edwin Chapin Starks in 1895. It is a marine, polar water-dwelling fish which is known from the northwestern Pacific Ocean, including Peter the Great Bay; Robben Island, Sakhalin; and the Sea of Okhotsk. It dwells at a depth range 10 to 605 metres (33 to 1,985 ft). Males can reach a maximum total length of 28 centimetres (11 in).
