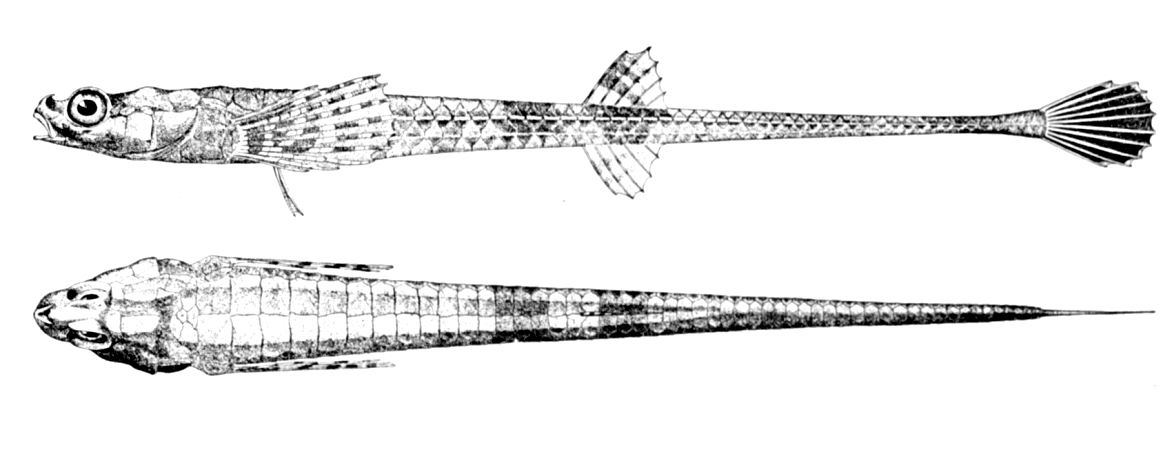
- Alligatorfish (A. monopterygius)

Scientific classification
- Kingdom: Animalia
- Phylum: Chordata
- Class: Actinopterygii
- Division: Teleostei
- Order: Perciformes
- Suborder: Cottoidei
- Family: Agonidae
- Subfamily: Anoplagoninae
- Genus: Aspidophoroides; Lacépède, 1801

Type species
- Aspidophoroides tranquebar Lacépède, 1801

= Aspidophoroides =

Genus of fishes

Aspidophoroides is a genus of poachers native to the northern Pacific and Atlantic oceans.

== Species ==
There are currently three recognized species in this genus:

- Aspidophoroides bartoni Gilbert, 1896
- Aspidophoroides monopterygius (Bloch, 1786) (Alligatorfish)
- Aspidophoroides olrikii Lütken, 1877 (Arctic alligatorfish)
