= Chesnonia =

Scientific classification
- Kingdom: Animalia
- Phylum: Chordata
- Class: Actinopterygii
- Order: Perciformes
- Suborder: Cottoidei
- Family: Agonidae
- Subfamily: Brachyopsinae
- Genus: Chesnonia; Iredale & Whitley, 1969
- Species: C. verrucosa

Binomial name
- Chesnonia verrucosa (Lockington, 1880)

Synonyms
- Brachyopsis verrucosus Lockington, 1880; Occa verrucosa (Lockington, 1880); Occella verrucosa (Lockington, 1880); Agonus barkani Steindachner, 1880

Species of fish

Chesnonia is a monospecific genus of ray-finned fish belonging to the subfamily Brachyopsinae in the family Agonidae. Its only species is Chesnonia verrucosa, the warty poacher, which is found in the northeastern Pacific Ocean where it occurs from Bristol Bay and Unimak Island in Alaska south to Point Montara in California. It is found at depths of from 18 to 425 metres (59 to 1,394 ft) over soft substrates. This species grows to a length of 20 centimetres (7.9 in) TL.
