= Pricklebreast poacher =

Scientific classification
- Domain: Eukaryota
- Kingdom: Animalia
- Phylum: Chordata
- Class: Actinopterygii
- Order: Perciformes
- Suborder: Cottoidei
- Family: Agonidae
- Subfamily: Brachyopsinae
- Genus: Stellerina; Cramer, 1896
- Species: S. xyosterna

Binomial name
- Stellerina xyosterna (D. S. Jordan & C. H. Gilbert, 1880)

Species of fish

The pricklebreast poacher (Stellerina xyosterna) is a species of poacher native to the eastern Pacific Ocean from Canada to northern Mexico. This species can be found on sandy or muddy bottoms at depths of from 5 to 75 metres (20 to 250 ft). This species grows to a length of 16 centimetres (6.3 in) TL. This species is the only known member of its genus.
