= Bothragonus occidentalis =

Scientific classification
- Domain: Eukaryota
- Kingdom: Animalia
- Phylum: Chordata
- Class: Actinopterygii
- Order: Perciformes
- Suborder: Cottoidei
- Family: Agonidae
- Genus: Bothragonus
- Species: B. occidentalis

Binomial name
- Bothragonus occidentalis Lindberg, 1935

Species of fish

Bothragonus occidentalis is a fish in the family Agonidae. It was described by Georgii Ustinovich Lindberg in 1935. It is a marine, temperate water-dwelling fish which is known from the northwestern Pacific Ocean, including Japan and Peter the Great Bay. It is known to dwell at a depth range of 0–100 metres. Males can reach a maximum total length of 7 centimetres.
