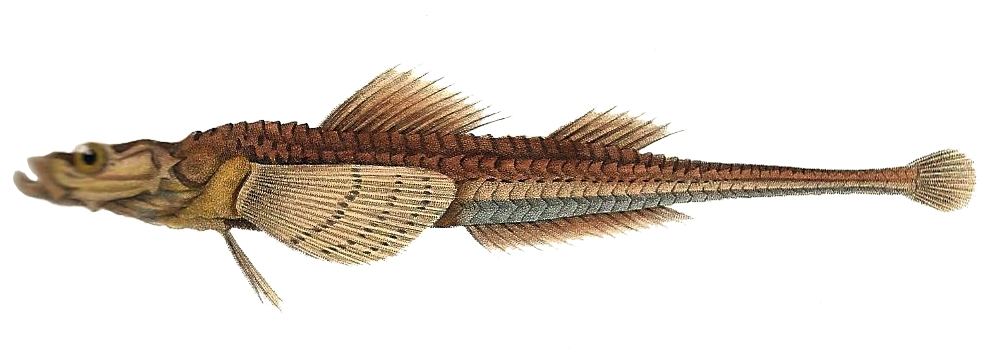

Scientific classification
- Kingdom: Animalia
- Phylum: Chordata
- Class: Actinopterygii
- Order: Perciformes
- Suborder: Cottoidei
- Family: Agonidae
- Subfamily: Brachyopsinae
- Genus: Brachyopsis; T. N. Gill, 1861
- Species: B. segaliensis

Binomial name
- Brachyopsis segaliensis (Tilesius, 1809)

Synonyms
- Agonus segaliensis Tilesius, 1809; Agonus rostratus Tilesius, 1813; Brachyopsis rostratus (Tilesius, 1813); Agonus laevigatus Tilesius, 1813; Phalangistes fusiformis Tilesius, 1814

= Brachyopsis =

Species of fish

Brachyopsis is a monospecific genus of ray-finned fish belonging to the subfamily Brachyopsinae in the family Agonidae. Its only species is Brachyopsis segaliensis which is found in the northwest Pacific Ocean where it occurs from the southern Okhotsk Sea to the northern Sea of Japan and the Pacific coast of northern Japan. It occurs at depths of from 0 to 110 metres (0 to 361 ft). This species grows to a length of 30 centimetres (12 in) TL.
