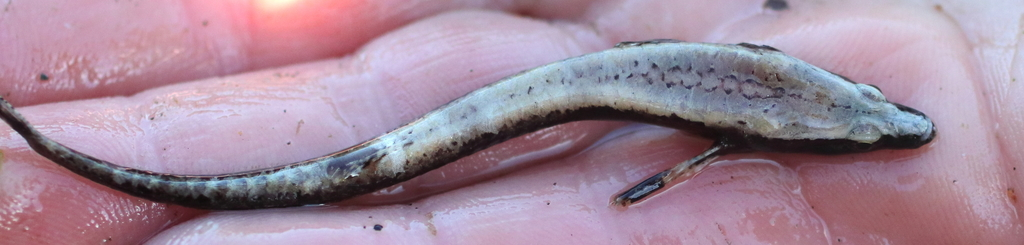
- Smooth alligator fish (Anoplagonus inermis)

Scientific classification
- Domain: Eukaryota
- Kingdom: Animalia
- Phylum: Chordata
- Class: Actinopterygii
- Order: Perciformes
- Suborder: Cottoidei
- Family: Agonidae
- Subfamily: Anoplagoninae
- Genus: Anoplagonus; T. N. Gill, 1861

Type species
- Aspidophoroides inermis Günther, 1860

= Anoplagonus =

Genus of fishes

Anoplagonus is a genus of poachers native to the northern Pacific Ocean.

== Species ==
There are currently two recognized species in this genus:

- Anoplagonus inermis (Günther, 1860) (Smooth alligatorfish)
- Anoplagonus occidentalis Lindberg, 1950
