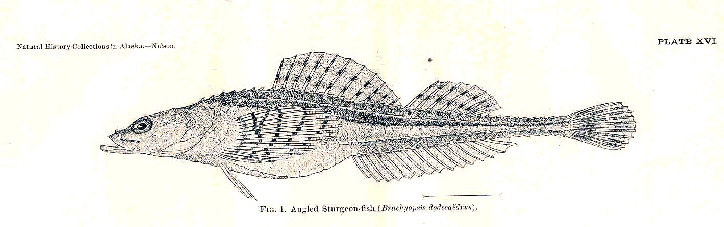
- Occella dodecaedron

Scientific classification
- Domain: Eukaryota
- Kingdom: Animalia
- Phylum: Chordata
- Class: Actinopterygii
- Order: Perciformes
- Suborder: Cottoidei
- Family: Agonidae
- Subfamily: Brachyopsinae
- Genus: Occella; D. S. Jordan & C. L. Hubbs, 1925

Type species
- Agonus dodecaedron Tilesius, 1813

Synonyms
- Iburiella Jordan & Hubbs, 1925; Iburina Jordan & Hubbs, 1925

= Occella =

Genus of fishes

Occella is a genus of poachers native to the northern Pacific Ocean.

== Species ==
There are currently four recognized species in this genus:

- Occella dodecaedron (Tilesius, 1813) (Bering poacher)
- Occella iburia (D. S. Jordan & Starks, 1904)
- Occella kasawae (D. S. Jordan & C. L. Hubbs, 1925)
- Occella kuronumai (Freeman, 1951)
