= Tilesina =

Scientific classification
- Kingdom: Animalia
- Phylum: Chordata
- Class: Actinopterygii
- Order: Perciformes
- Suborder: Cottoidei
- Family: Agonidae
- Subfamily: Brachyopsinae
- Genus: Tilesina; P. J. Schmidt, 1904
- Species: T. gibbosa

Binomial name
- Tilesina gibbosa P. J. Schmidt, 1904

Species of fish

Tilesina is a monospecific genus of ray-finned fish belonging to the subfamily Brachyopsinae in the family Agonidae. Its only species is Tilesina gibbosa, a species found in the northwestern Pacific Ocean. This species occurs at depths of from 15 to 400 metres (49 to 1,312 ft). This species grows to a length of 36 centimetres (14 in) TL.
