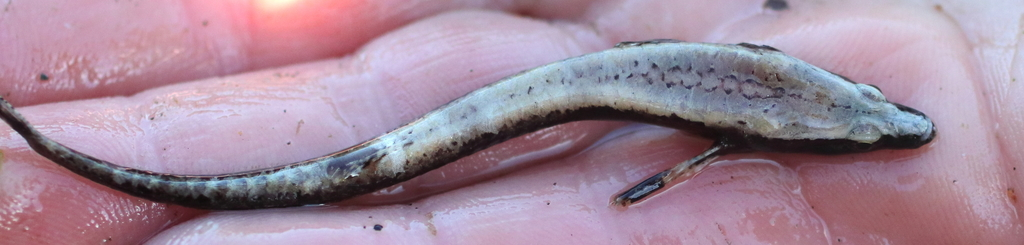
- Smooth alligatorfish (Anoplagonus inermis)

Scientific classification
- Kingdom: Animalia
- Phylum: Chordata
- Class: Actinopterygii
- Order: Perciformes
- Suborder: Cottoidei
- Family: Agonidae
- Subfamily: Anoplagoninae; Gill, 1861

Genera
- see text

= Anoplagoninae =

Subfamily of fishes

Anoplagoninae is a subfamily of marine ray-finned fishes belonging to the family Agonidae, part of the sculpin superfamily Cottoidea. These fishes are found in the North Pacific Ocean.

== Genera ==
Anoplagoninae contains following 2 genera:

- Anoplagonus Gill, 1861
- Aspidophoroides Lacépède, 1801
