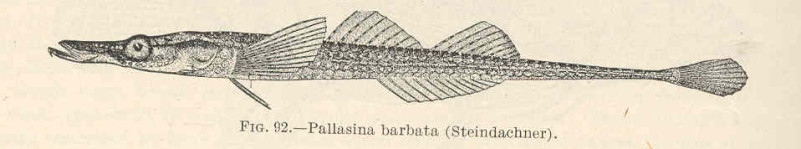
- Pallasina barbata

Scientific classification
- Kingdom: Animalia
- Phylum: Chordata
- Class: Actinopterygii
- Order: Perciformes
- Suborder: Cottoidei
- Family: Agonidae
- Subfamily: Brachyopsinae
- Genus: Pallasina; Cramer in Jordan & Starks, 1895

= Pallasina =

Genus of fishes

Pallasina is a genus of poachers native to the northern Pacific Ocean.

== Taxonomy and systematics ==
The genus Pallasina was formerly monotypic, with only P. barbata included. The other species had been relegated to synonyms, but were reconfirmed as valid in 2021.

== Species ==
There are currently three recognized species in this genus:

- Pallasina aix Starks, 1896
- Pallasina barbata (Steindachner, 1876) (Tubenose poacher)
- Pallasina eryngia Jordan & Richardson, 1907
