= Longnose poacher =

Scientific classification
- Kingdom: Animalia
- Phylum: Chordata
- Class: Actinopterygii
- Division: Teleostei
- Order: Perciformes
- Suborder: Cottoidei
- Family: Agonidae
- Genus: Leptagonus
- Species: L. leptorhynchus

Binomial name
- Leptagonus leptorhynchus (Gilbert, 1896)

Synonyms
- Odontopyxis leptorhynchus Gilbert, 1896; Sarritor leptorhynchus (Gilbert, 1896)

Species of fish

The longnose poacher (Leptagonus leptorhynchus) is a fish in the family Agonidae. It was described by Charles Henry Gilbert in 1896, originally under the genus Odontopyxis. It is a marine, deep water-dwelling fish which is known from the northern Pacific Ocean, including the Bering Sea, southeastern Alaska, northern Japan, the Sea of Japan and the Sea of Okhotsk. It dwells at a depth range of 20 to 460 metres (70 to 1,510 ft). Males can reach a maximum total length of 25 centimetres (9.8 in).

The Longfin poacher's diet consists of crustaceans such as euphausiids, mysids, amphipods, and copepods, as well as polychaetes and other benthic invertebrates.
