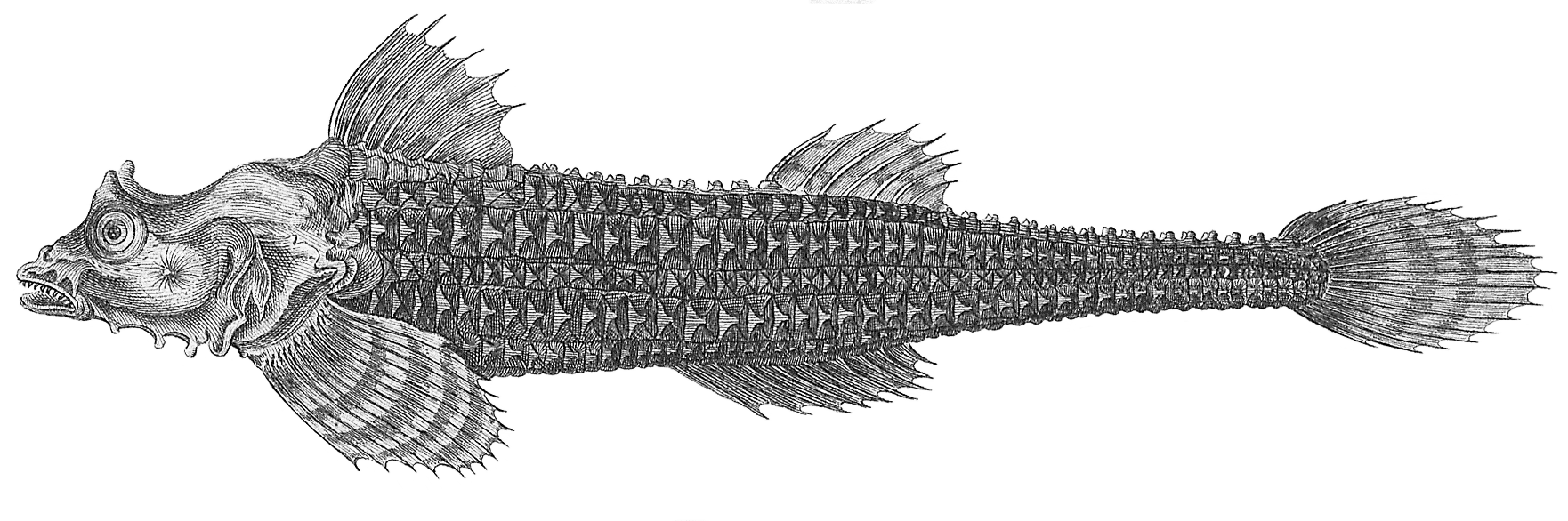
- Percis japonica

Scientific classification
- Kingdom: Animalia
- Phylum: Chordata
- Class: Actinopterygii
- Order: Perciformes
- Suborder: Cottoidei
- Family: Agonidae
- Subfamily: Hypsagoninae
- Genus: Percis; Scopoli, 1777

Type species
- Cottus japonicus Pallas, 1769

= Percis =

Genus of fishes

Percis is a genus of poachers native to the northern Pacific Ocean.

Percis also is the name of a conference series focused on the family of Percidae fishes. Percis is something of an acronym for 'Percid International Symposium'. While fish related, it is not associated with the Percis genus of fishes.

== Species ==
There are currently two recognized species in this genus:

- Percis japonica (Pallas, 1769) (Dragon poacher)
- Percis matsuii Matsubara, 1936
