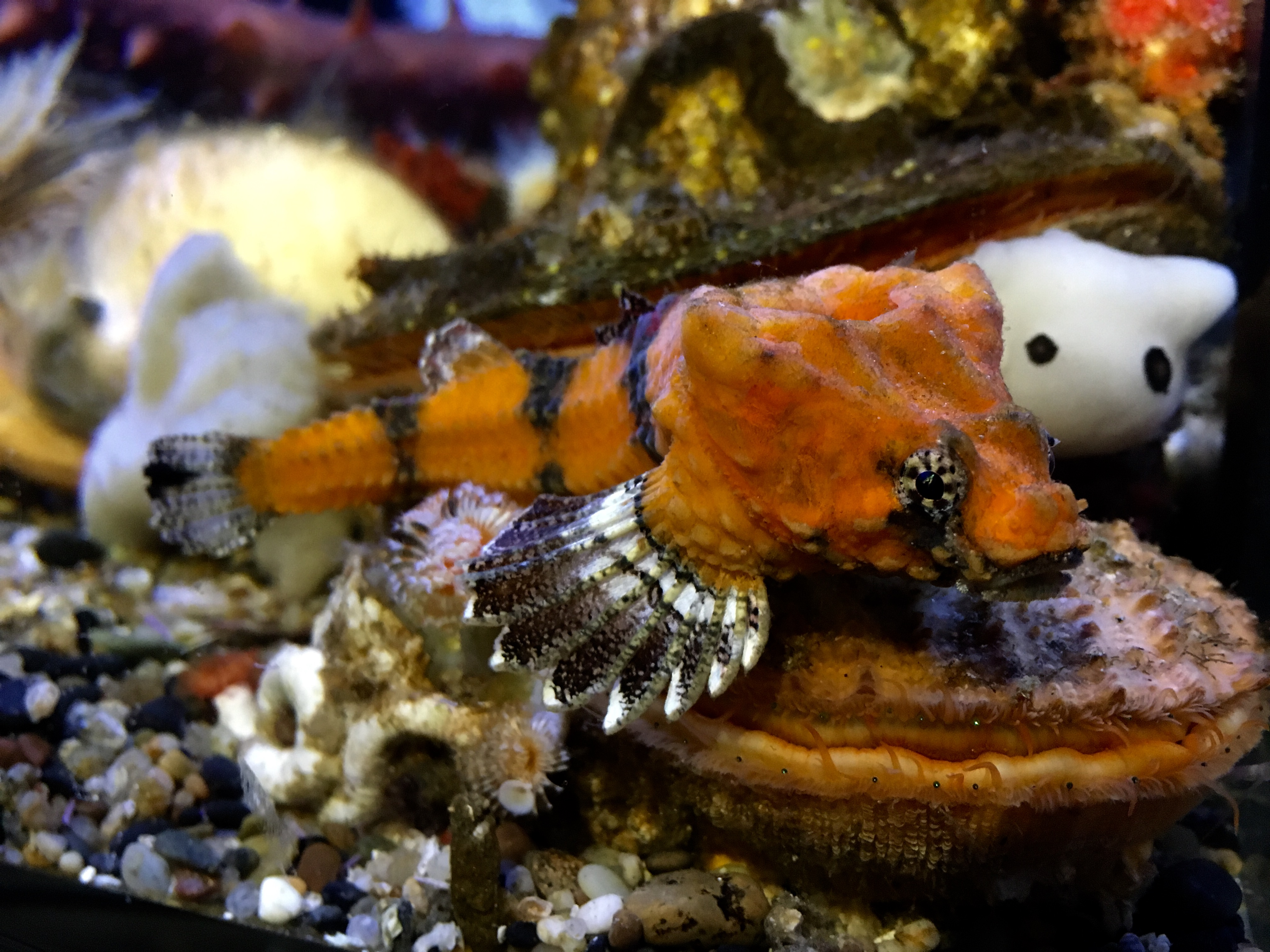
- A rockhead on top of a rock scallop at the Oregon Coast Aquarium

Scientific classification
- Kingdom: Animalia
- Phylum: Chordata
- Class: Actinopterygii
- Order: Perciformes
- Suborder: Cottoidei
- Family: Agonidae
- Subfamily: Bothragoninae; Lindberg, 1971
- Genus: Bothragonus; T. N. Gill, 1883

Type species
- Hypsagonus swanii Steindachner, 1876

= Bothragonus =

Bothragonus Temporal range: Middle Miocene to present

Genus of fishes

Bothragonus is a genus of marine ray-finned fishes belonging to the family Agonidae, the poachers and related fishes. It is the only genus in monotypic subfamily Bothragoninae. These fishes are found in the northern Pacific Ocean.

== Taxonomy ==
Bothragonus was first proposed as a genus by the American zoologist Theodore Gill in 1883 with Hypsagonus swanii, which had been described in 1876 by Franz Steindachner from Port Townsend on Puget Sound in Washington, as its type species. In 1971 the Soviet ichthyologist Georgii Ustinovich Lindberg proposed that the genus Bothragonus be placed in the new subfamily of the Agonidae, the Bothragoninae, although this was not universally accepted. The 5th edition of Fishes of the World recognises the validity of the Bothragoninae as a subfamily of the Agonidae.

== Species ==
There are currently two recognized species in this genus:

- Bothragonus occidentalis Lindberg, 1935
- Bothragonus swanii (Steindachner, 1876) (Rockhead)

An indeterminate fossil specimen of Bothragonus is known from the Middle Miocene of Sakhalin, Russia.

== Etymology ==
Bothragonus is a combination of bothra, meaning "cavity", a reference to the deep pit on the nape, and Agonus the type genus of the Agonidae. 2

== Characteritics ==
Bothragonus is characterised by the head and the front part of the body having a rhomboid cross section with the rear part of the body being laterally compressed. The first dorsal fin and the anal fin are poorly developed. There is a row of bony plates located between the upper and main lateral lines and another row is located between the two lower lateral lines. There is an enlarged, spineless plate on the snout and the lower side of the head is armoured with a number of sharply spined plates. The sensory canal on the occipital is broken at its middle. The urohyal has no pelvic keel, there is a postpelvic spine and two epurals. These fishes have a maximum published total length of 8.9 cm (3.5 in).

== Distribution and habitat ==
Bothragonus are found in the eastern and western North Pacific Ocean. They are found in shallow waters of less than 100 m (330 ft) depth and may be found in tidal pools.
