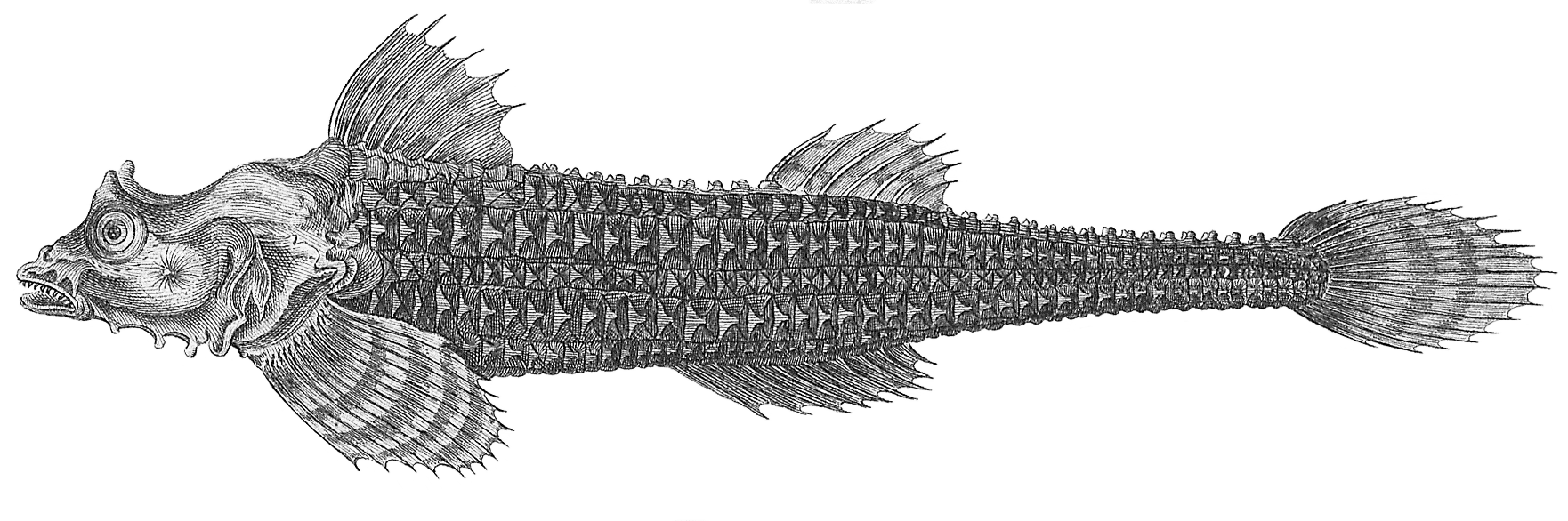

Scientific classification
- Domain: Eukaryota
- Kingdom: Animalia
- Phylum: Chordata
- Class: Actinopterygii
- Order: Perciformes
- Suborder: Cottoidei
- Family: Agonidae
- Genus: Percis
- Species: P. japonica

Binomial name
- Percis japonica (Pallas, 1769)

Synonyms
- Cottus japonicus Pallas, 1769; Percis japonicus (Pallas, 1769); Aspidophorus lisiza Lacépède, 1801; Agonus stegophthalmus Tilesius, 1813; Agonus curillicus Tilesius, 1813; Aspidophorus superciliosus Cuvier, 1829

= Dragon poacher =

Species of fish

The dragon poacher (Percis japonica) is a fish in the family Agonidae. It was described by Peter Simon Pallas in 1769, originally under the genus Cottus. It is a marine, deep water-dwelling fish which is known from the northern Pacific Ocean, including the Sea of Japan (from which its species epithet is derived), the Sea of Okhotsk, and the Bering Sea. It dwells at a depth range of 19 to 750 metres (62 to 2,461 ft), and inhabits gravel, sand and mud sediments. Males can reach a maximum total length of 42 centimetres (17 in).

The dragon poacher's diet consists of benthic crustaceans including shrimp, crabs, amphipods, as well as mysids, oligochaetes, and polychaetes.
