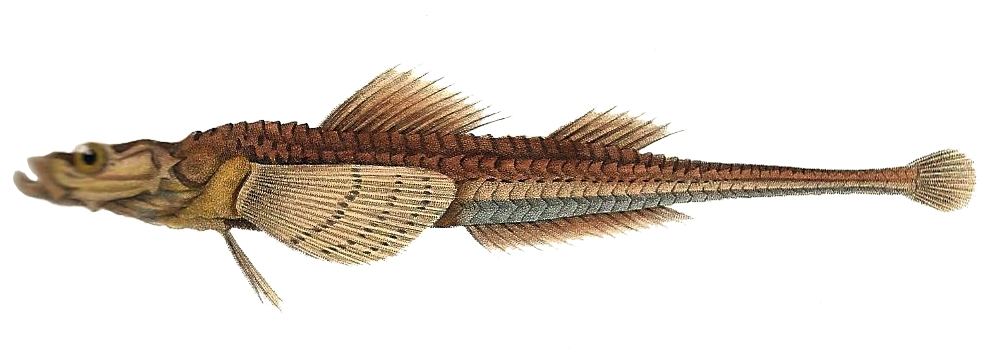
- Brachyopsis segaliensis

Scientific classification
- Kingdom: Animalia
- Phylum: Chordata
- Class: Actinopterygii
- Order: Perciformes
- Suborder: Cottoidei
- Family: Agonidae
- Subfamily: Brachyopsinae; Jordan & Evermann, 1898

Genera
- see text

= Brachyopsinae =

Subfamily of fishes

Brachyopsinae is a subfamily of marine ray-finned fishes belonging to the family Agonidae, part of the sculpin superfamily Cottoidea. These fishes are found in the North Pacific Ocean.

== Genera ==
Brachyopsinae contains following 6 genera:

- Brachyopsis Gill, 1861
- Chesnonia Iredale & Whitley, 1969
- Occella Jordan & Hubbs, 1925
- Pallasina Cramer, 1895
- Stellerina Cramer, 1896
- Tilesina Schmidt, 1904
