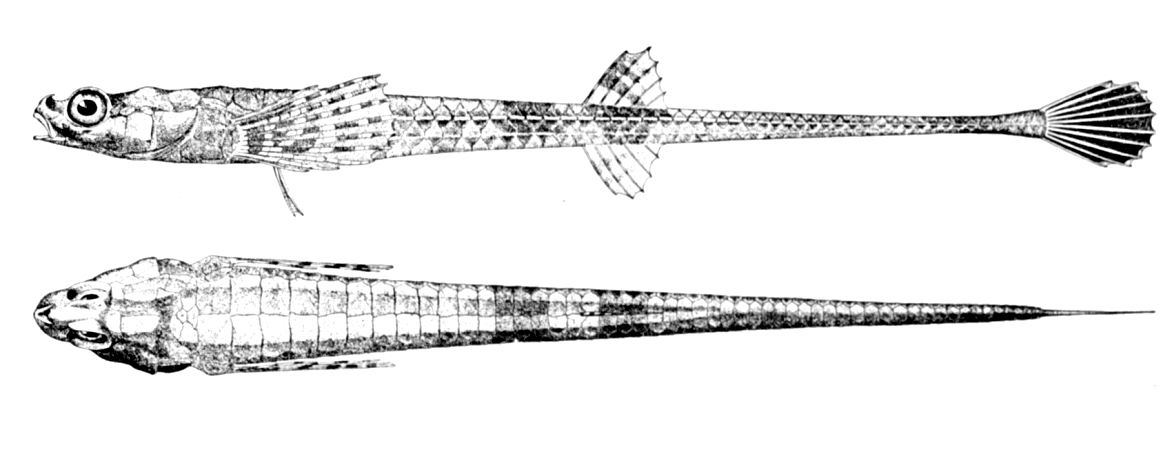

Scientific classification
- Kingdom: Animalia
- Phylum: Chordata
- Class: Actinopterygii
- Order: Perciformes
- Suborder: Cottoidei
- Family: Agonidae
- Genus: Aspidophoroides
- Species: A. monopterygius

Binomial name
- Aspidophoroides monopterygius (Bloch, 1786)

Synonyms
- Cottus monopterygius Bloch, 1786; Cottus indicus Bonnaterre, 1788; Aspidophoroides tranquebar Lacépède, 1801; Aspidophoroides groenlandicus Valenciennes, 1840; Aspidophoroides borealis Valenciennes, 1841; Aspidophoroides bartoni Gilbert, 1896

= Alligatorfish =

Species of fish

The alligatorfish (Aspidophoroides monopterygius), also known commonly as the Aleutian alligatorfish and the Atlantic alligatorfish, is a fish in the family Agonidae. It was described by Marcus Elieser Bloch in 1786. It is a marine, temperate water-dwelling fish which is known from the northwestern Atlantic Ocean, including western Greenland; Labrador, Canada; and Cape Cod, Massachusetts, USA. It dwells at a depth range of 0–695 metres, most often around 60–150 m, and inhabits sand and mud bottoms mostly on the lower continental shelf all year. It prefers a temperature range of -1.07 to 2.52 °C. Males can reach a maximum total length of 22 centimetres, but more commonly reach a TL of 14.2 cm.

The Alligatorfish is preyed on by the Atlantic halibut (Hippoglossus hippoglossus) and the Pacific halibut (Hippoglossus stenolepis). Its own diet consists primarily of benthic crustaceans and bottom fauna.
