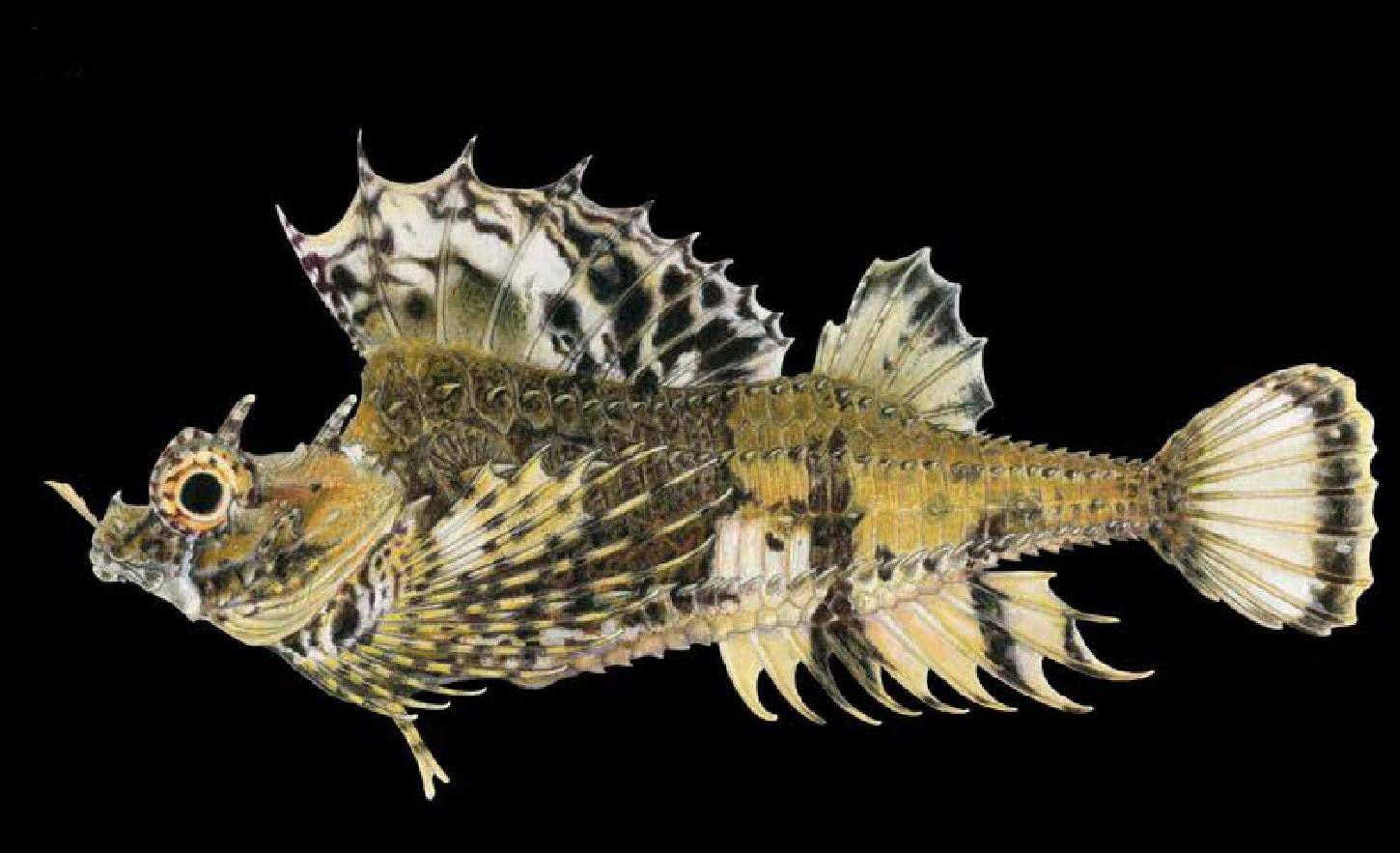
- Fourhorn poacher, Hypsagonus quadricornis

Scientific classification
- Kingdom: Animalia
- Phylum: Chordata
- Class: Actinopterygii
- Division: Teleostei
- Order: Perciformes
- Suborder: Cottoidei
- Family: Agonidae
- Subfamily: Hypsagoninae
- Genus: Hypsagonus; T. N. Gill, 1861

Type species
- Aspidophorus quadricornis Valenciennes, 1858

Synonyms
- Cheiragonus Herzenstein, 1890

= Hypsagonus =

Genus of fishes

Hypsagonus is a genus of poachers native to the northern Pacific Ocean.

== Species ==
There are currently three recognized species in this genus:

- Hypsagonus corniger Taranetz, 1933
- Hypsagonus mozinoi Wilimovsky & D. E. Wilson, 1979 (Kelp poacher)
- Hypsagonus quadricornis (Valenciennes, 1829) (Fourhorn poacher)
