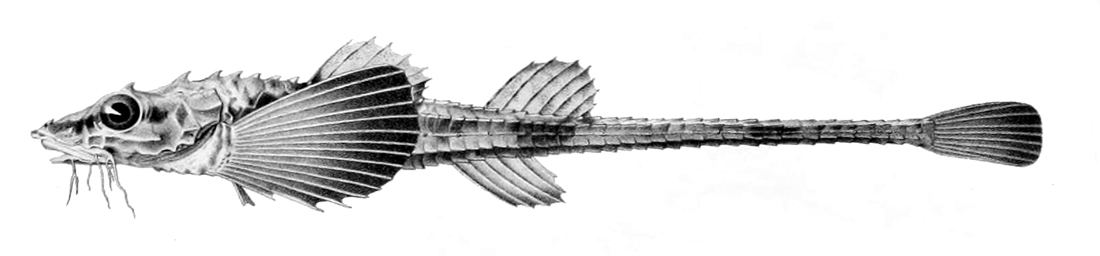

Conservation status
- Least Concern (IUCN 3.1)

Scientific classification
- Kingdom: Animalia
- Phylum: Chordata
- Class: Actinopterygii
- Order: Perciformes
- Suborder: Cottoidei
- Family: Agonidae
- Subfamily: Agoninae
- Genus: Leptagonus; T. N. Gill, 1861
- Species: L. decagonus

Binomial name
- Leptagonus decagonus (Bloch & J. G. Schneider, 1801)

Synonyms
- Agonus decagonus Bloch & Schneider, 1801; Aspidophorus spinosissimus Krøyer, 1845; Aspidophorus malarmoides Eudes-Deslongchamps, 1853; Leptagonus decagonus pacificus Schmidt, 1950

= Atlantic poacher =

Species of fish

The Atlantic poacher (Leptagonus decagonus) is a species of poacher native to the northern oceans. It is found at depths of from 0 to 930 metres (0 to 3,051 ft). This species grows to a length of 21 centimetres (8.3 in) TL. This species is the only known member of its genus.
