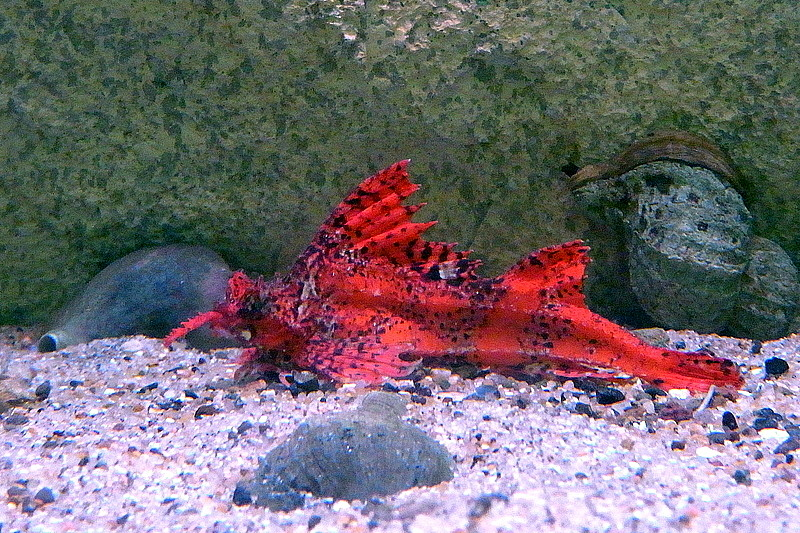
- Agonomalus proboscidalis

Scientific classification
- Kingdom: Animalia
- Phylum: Chordata
- Class: Actinopterygii
- Division: Teleostei
- Order: Perciformes
- Suborder: Cottoidei
- Family: Agonidae
- Subfamily: Hypsagoninae
- Genus: Agonomalus; Guichenot, 1866

Type species
- Aspidophorus proboscidalis Valenciennes, 1858

= Agonomalus =

Genus of fishes

Agonomalus is a genus of poachers native to the Pacific Ocean.

== Species ==
There are currently two recognized species in this genus:

- Agonomalus jordani D. S. Jordan & Starks, 1904
- Agonomalus proboscidalis (Valenciennes, 1858)
