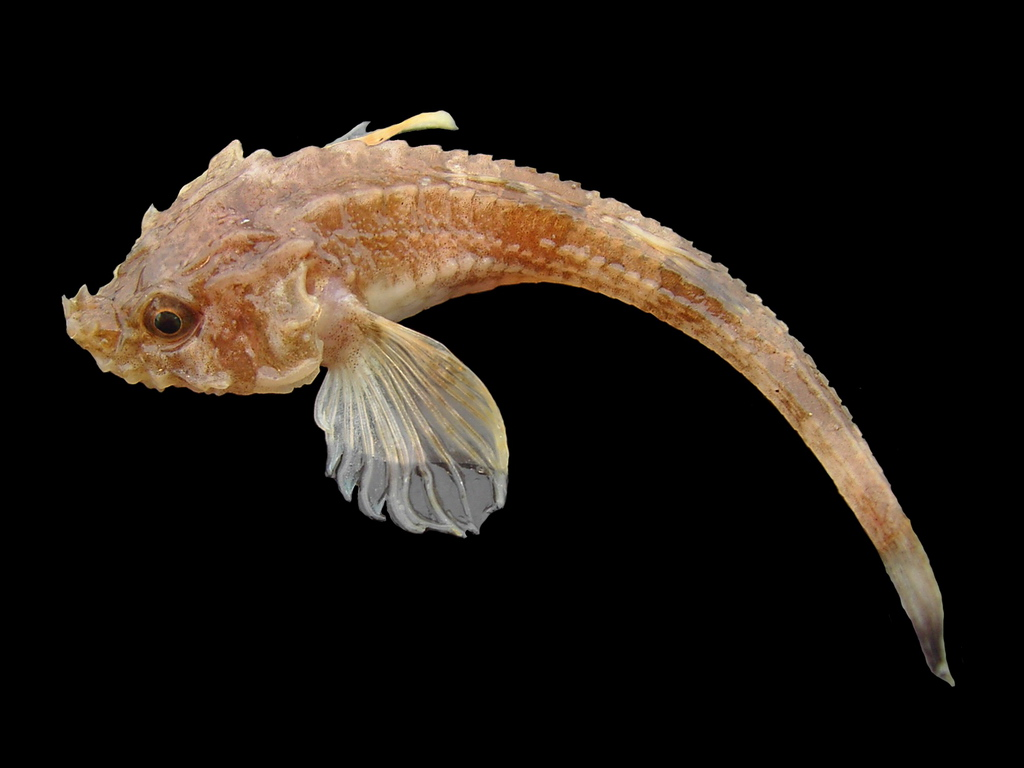
- Hooknose (Agonus cataphractus)

Scientific classification
- Kingdom: Animalia
- Phylum: Chordata
- Class: Actinopterygii
- Division: Teleostei
- Order: Perciformes
- Suborder: Cottoidei
- Family: Agonidae
- Subfamily: Agoninae; Swainson, 1839

Genera
- see text

= Agoninae =

Subfamily of fishes

Agoninae is a subfamily of marine ray-finned fishes belonging to the family Agonidae, part of the sculpin superfamily Cottoidea. These fishes are found in the Pacific and Atlantic Oceans.

== Genera ==
Brachyopsinae contains following genera:

- Agonus Bloch & Schneider, 1801
- Bothragonus Gill in Jordan & Gilbert, 1883
