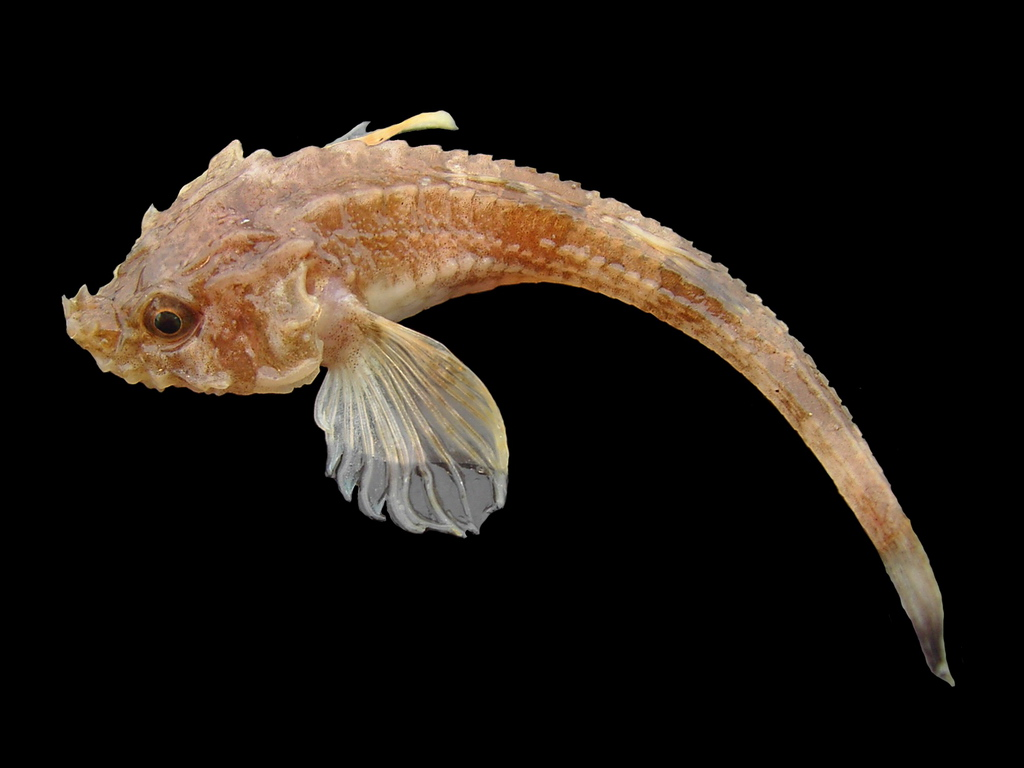

Conservation status
- Least Concern (IUCN 3.1)

Scientific classification
- Kingdom: Animalia
- Phylum: Chordata
- Class: Actinopterygii
- Division: Teleostei
- Order: Perciformes
- Suborder: Cottoidei
- Family: Agonidae
- Subfamily: Agoninae
- Genus: Agonus; Bloch & J. G. Schneider, 1801
- Species: A. cataphractus

Binomial name
- Agonus cataphractus (Linnaeus, 1758)

Synonyms
- Cottus cataphractus Linnaeus, 1758; Phalangistes cataphractus (Linnaeus, 1758); Aspidophorus cataphractus (Linnaeus, 1758); Cottus brodamus Bonnaterre, 1788; Aspidophorus armatus Lacépède, 1801; Cataphractus schoneveldii Fleming, 1828; Aspidophorus europaeus Cuvier, 1829; Paragonus sertorii Miranda-Ribeiro, 1918; Ribeiroa sertorii (Miranda Ribeiro, 1918)

= Agonus =

Species of fish

Agonus is a monospecific genus of ray-finned fish belonging to the subfamily Agoninae in the family Agonidae. Its only species is Agonus cataphractus, commonly known as the hooknose, pogge or armed bullhead. This is a demersal fish found in the coastal waters of the northeastern Atlantic Ocean.

== Taxonomy ==
Agonus was first proposed as a genus in 1801 by the German naturalists Marcus Elieser Bloch and Johann Gottlob Theaenus Schneider. Bloch and Schneider classified 4 species in Agonus and in 1814 Tilesius designated Cottus cataphractus as the type species of the genus. Cottus cataphractus was described by Linnaeus in 1758 with a type locality of Europe. The genus Agonus is now regarded as monotypic and is classified within the subfamily Agoninae in the family Agonidae.

== Etymology ==
Agonus, the genus name, was not explained by Bloch and Schneider but may derive from the Greek agónos, meaning "combat", referring to the specific name cataphractus which means "clad in armour".

== Description ==
Agonus is characterised by the head and body having a complete covering of hard. bony plates, the plates on the body being jointed to enable the fish to move. There is a robust, curved spine on the lower edge of the operculum and another curved spine with two tips on the end of the snout. The ventral surface of the head bears numerous short barbels. The first dorsal fin is short based and is supported by 5 or 6 flexible spines, the second dorsal fin is longer based and contains between 6 and 8 soft rays, the anal fin is a similar shape to the second dorsal fin and contains between 5 and 7 soft rays. It has a slender tail with a small caudal fin at its end. The overall colour is dull brown on the upper body, marked with four dark dorsal saddles, with a pale lower body. The maximum published total length is 21 cm (8.3 in), although 14 cm (5.5 in) is more typical.

== Distribution and habitat ==
Agonus is found in coastal waters of the northeastern Atlantic Ocean where it is distributed from the southern White Sea, also occurring around Jan Mayen, and in the Barents Sea, Norwegian Sea, Baltic Sea and in the North Sea south to the English Channel. It typically is found in inshore waters, moving to deeper waters in winter in the Skagerrak, normally on sandy substrates, occasionally on bottoms with stones. It is found at depths of 0 to 270 m (0 to 886 ft).

== Biology ==
Agonus feeds on small crustaceans, molluscs, brittle stars and worms. They spawn from February to May in the bases of kelps and whelks. The eggs take a long time to hatch. Very little else is known about the biology of this species.
