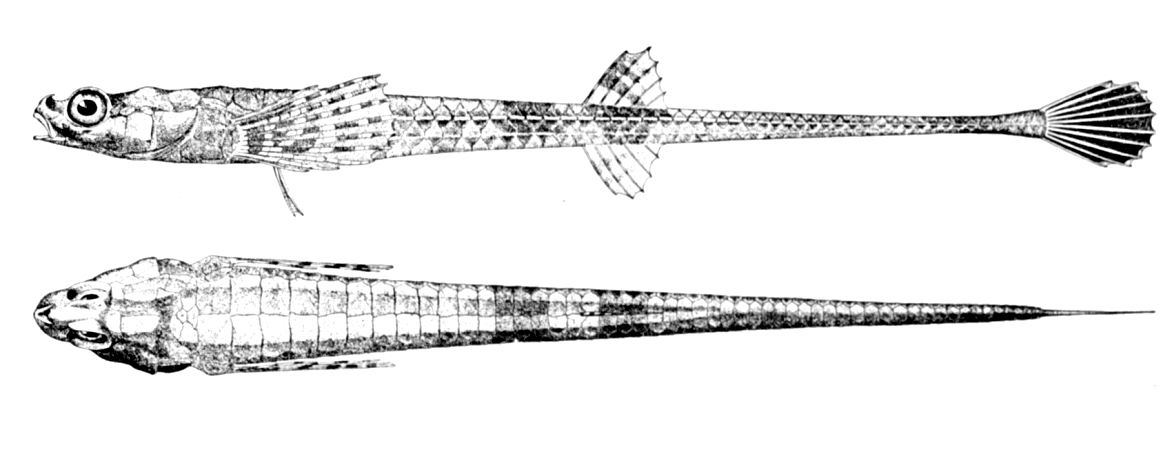
- Alligatorfish (Aspidophoroides monopterygius)

Scientific classification
- Kingdom: Animalia
- Phylum: Chordata
- Class: Actinopterygii
- Order: Perciformes
- Suborder: Cottoidei
- Superfamily: Cottoidea
- Family: Agonidae; Swainson, 1839

Subfamilies and genera
- See text

= Agonidae =

Agonidae Temporal range: Middle Miocene–present

Family of ray-finned fishes

Agonidae is a family of small, bottom-dwelling, cold-water marine fish. Common names for members of this family include poachers, Irish lords, sea ravens, alligatorfishes, starsnouts, hooknoses, and rockheads. They are notable for having elongated bodies covered by scales modified into bony plates, and for using their large pectoral fins to move in short bursts. The family includes about 59 species in some 25 genera, some of which are quite widespread.

The pelvic fins are nearly vestigial, typically consisting of one small spine and a few rays. The swim bladder is not present.

At 42 centimetres (17 in) in length, the dragon poacher (Percis japonica) is the largest member of the family, while Bothragonus occidentalis is 7 cm (2.8 in) long as an adult; most are in the 20–30 cm range.

Agonidae species generally feed on small crustaceans and marine worms found on the bottom. Some species camouflage themselves with hydras, sponges, or seaweed. They live at 1,280 m (4,200 ft) deep, with only a few species preferring shallower, coastal waters. All but one species are restricted to the Northern Hemisphere.

An indeterminate fossil agonid is known from a nearly complete skeleton from the mid-Miocene-aged St. Marys Formation of Maryland, US, representing the earliest known member of the family.

== Taxonomy ==
The family Agonidae was first proposed as a family in 1839 by the English naturalist William Swainson. The Agonidae is classified within the superfamily Cottoidea in the suborder Cottoidei in the order Scorpaeniformes in the 5th edition of Fishes of the World but other authorities states that if Scorpaeniformes is excluded from Perciformes then Perciformes is recovered as paraphyletic and so classify this family within the infraorder Cottales within the suborder Cottoidei of the Perciformes. A number of taxa which were previously classified within the Cottidae were reclassified within the Agonidae which meant that the Cottidae was confined to the freshwater sculpins.

== Subfamilies and genera ==
The Agonidae is divided into the following subfamilies and genera:

- Hypsagoninae Gill, 1861 (dragon poachers)
  - Agonomalus Guichenot, 1866
  - Hypsagonus Gill, 1861
  - Percis Scopoli, 1777
- Agoninae Swainson, 1839 (hooknose poachers)
  - Agonus Bloch & Schneider, 1801
  - Bothragonus Gill, 1883
- Anoplagoninae Gill, 1861 (alligator fishes)
  - Anoplagonus Gill, 1861
  - Aspidophoroides Lacépède, 1801
- Podothecinae Gill, 1861 (sturgeon poachers)
  - Freemanichthys Kanayama, 1991
  - Leptagonus Gill, 1861 (= Sarritor Cramer, 1896)
  - Podothecus Gill, 1861
- Brachyopsinae Jordan & Evermann, 1898 (uppermouth poachers)
  - Brachyopsis Gill, 1861
  - Chesnonia Iredale & Whitley, 1969
  - Occella Jordan & Hubbs, 1925
  - Pallasina Cramer, 1895
  - Stellerina Cramer, 1896
  - Tilesina Schmidt, 1904
- Agonopsinae Vandenberg et al. 2026 (spearnose poachers)
  - Agonopsis Gill, 1861
- Bathyagoninae Lindberg, 1971 (starsnouts)
  - Bathyagonus Gilbert, 1890
  - Odontopyxis Lockington, 1880
  - Xeneretmus Gilbert, 1903

The genera Nautichthys, Hemilepidotus, and the Hemitripterinae (Blepsias & Hemitripterus) were formerly placed within the Agonidae, but a 2026 study found them to form a distinct clade sister to the Agonidae, which, in combination with their distinctive morphology, led them all to be placed as distinct families.
