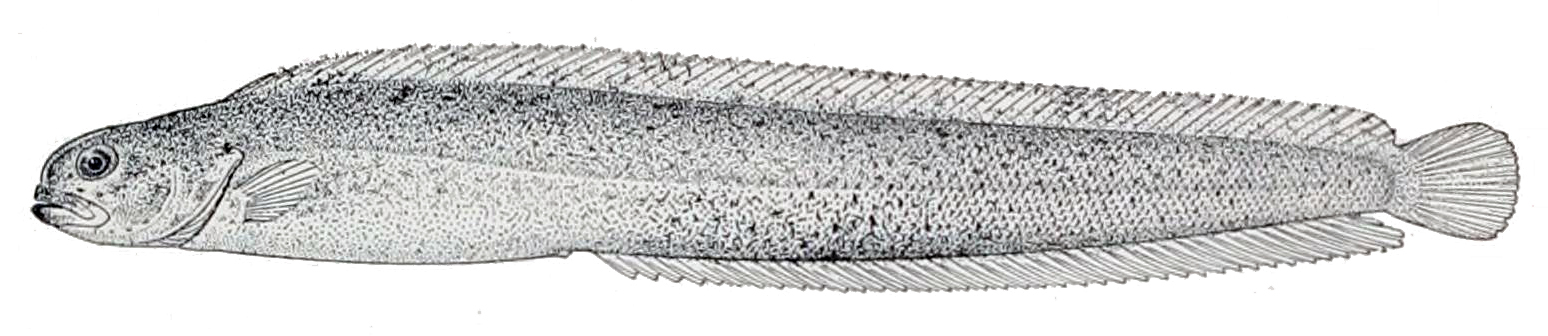

Scientific classification
- Kingdom: Animalia
- Phylum: Chordata
- Class: Actinopterygii
- Order: Perciformes
- Family: Stichaeidae
- Subfamily: Xiphisterinae
- Genus: Alectridium; Gilbert & Burke, 1912
- Species: A. aurantiacum

Binomial name
- Alectridium aurantiacum Gilbert & Burke, 1912

Synonyms
- Alectrias aurantiacum (Gilbert & Burke, 1912)

= Lesser prickleback =

Species of fish

The lesser prickleback (Alectridium aurantiacum) is a species of marine ray-finned fish belonging to the family Stichaeidae, which includes the pricklebacks and shannies. It is the only species in the monospecific genus Alectridium which is found in the northern Pacific Ocean. Sometimes the lesser prickleback has also been called the North Pacific prickleback, because it is mostly found in these waters.

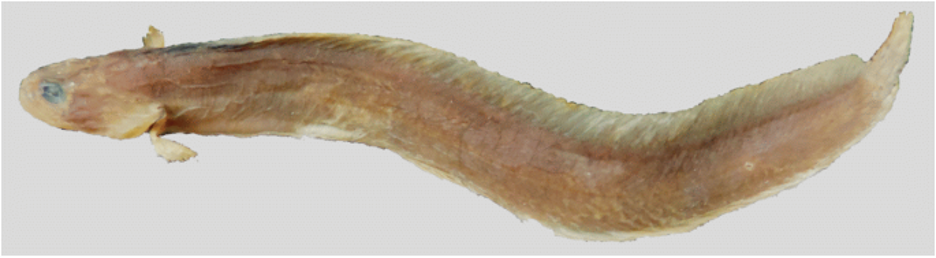
A dried lesser prickleback Alectridium aurantiacum caught off Cape Olyutorsky in 2017

== Description ==
Currently, there are very few photos of the lesser prickleback, which makes it challenging to find an accurate and reliable description of the species itself.

Sister species of the lesser prickleback, which are included in the subfamily Xiphisterinae, are similar in body plan and function to eels. Pricklebacks are not true eels, as they are not included under the family Anguilliformes—as mentioned above, they are in Stichaeidae.

They share the anguilliform body type (defined by being slender and elongated) and pendulous movement while swimming. Because it is in its own genus, the closest relatives of the lesser prickleback are those in their subfamily, which include the ribbon prickleback and monkeyface prickleback. This subfamily is characterized as being ray-finned; true to form, the dorsal fin of the lesser prickleback contains spiny rays.

Their possible range in length remains to be determined, but it has been recorded to be 13.3 cm (5.24 inches). Some of the lesser prickleback's closest relatives, such as the monkeyface prickleback, can range in length up to 30 inches.

Similar species that the lesser prickleback may be confused with include the lesser spiny eel due to their near identical morphology, especially in youth. The lesser prickleback also looks like its more popular sister species, the monkeyface prickleback, which is currently undergoing research as a possible source of nutrients in aquaponics.

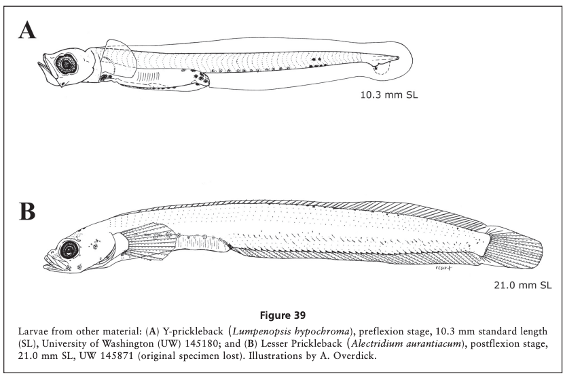
Creature B depicts a lesser prickleback in its postflexion life stage (the third larval stage of development).

== History and distribution ==
So far, known populations of this species exist in the northern Pacific Ocean, although estimates of the population size are unclear. Between 1997 and 2002, pricklebacks (as a group) made up a very small percentage of forage fish catch and biomass estimates across the Gulf of Alaska, with a peak in population in 2001.

It has mostly been found in and around the northern Pacific Ocean. Sources that have confirmed sightings of specimens range from Russia to the Commander and Aleutian Islands, as well as Alaska and the general Bering Sea. Thus, its distribution range is defined as polar.

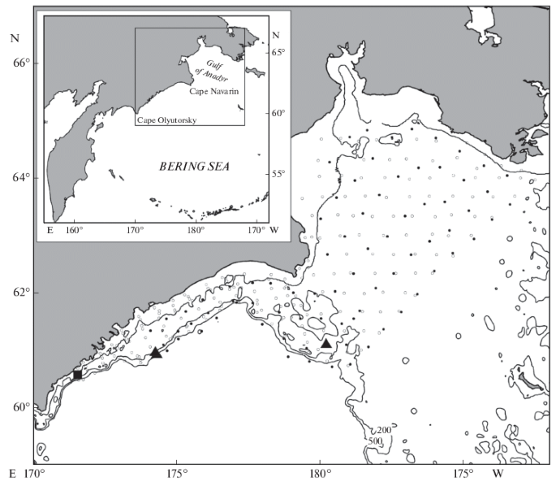
Sites of capture of Sebastes variabilis (triangles) and Alectridium aurantiacum (squares) in the western Bering Sea in 2017–2018; stations: (white circles)—2017, (black circles)—2018.

== Habitat ==
The lesser prickleback solely survives in saltwater habitats, inhabiting depths to 56 meters. It's defined as benthopelagic, mainly remaining among the subtidal and lower intertidal zones.

Although this species lives in the polar region, it seems to tolerate warmer waters. Some sources suggest that it is slowly migrating further north as the oceans warm. In 2017-2018, the lesser prickleback was found in the western Bering Sea near Cape Olyutorsky—much farther north than its usual range. This may mean that its preferred habitat is being affected by global warming.

== Biology ==
As a group, pricklebacks have an elongated, slim, eel-like body shape with small fins. The lesser prickleback's tail, or caudal fin, is rounded, with no notable fork. This implies that it may not have to swim very quickly over long distances, instead opting for short bursts.

As a result of its niche in the water column, the lesser prickleback tends to feed upon both benthic and swimming organisms. Prickleback fishes in general display a wide range in their diet—between the lesser prickleback and its sister taxa, diets can differ drastically, even when they are found in the same habitats.

According to some sources, it can be distinguished from its sister species by the singular interorbital sensory head pore in the center of its head. These can help with sensing their environment and interpreting whether to react to movement nearby. Another unique feature are the scales on its body, which don't extend past the thirteenth ray of the anal fin.

The lesser prickleback seems to be smaller compared to other prickleback fishes, which may make it more vulnerable to predators. However, its spiny rays along its dorsal fin may serve as protection against threats.

== Life cycle ==
As juveniles, lesser pricklebacks are near indistinguishable from the other members of their family. They are commonly mistaken for eels, as their body plan and fins fully fledge later in their life cycle.

The larvae of the Xiphisterinae subfamily are unique because they have pelvic fins, while the other members of the Stichaeidae family lack such fins. Not much information has been collected on the life stages of Alectridium aurantiacum, and the only information, which is about the postflexion life stage, is flagged as uncertain.

There is little to no data on the lesser prickleback's longevity or its age of maturity. Considering that each of its sister species exhibit the life history stages of egg, preflexion, flexion, postflexion (the three larval stages), and juvenile, it may be assumed that the lesser prickleback undergoes similar processes.

== Conservation status ==
Currently, there are not specific prohibitions against fishing and catching lesser pricklebacks. However, there is some interest in considering pricklebacks as a new frontier in seafood.

Because the lesser prickleback is not recorded to have much cultural relevance or economic importance in human society, it can be determined that interactions between lesser pricklebacks and humans are few and far between. Thus, there are likely few limits on fishing. It has been determined an unthreatening and harmless species towards humans.
