= Ulvaria =

Ulvaria may refer to:

- Ulvaria (fish), an animal genus in the family Stichaeidae
- Ulvaria (alga), a plant genus in the family Ulvaceae
