= Nivchia =

Nivchia Temporal range: Middle Miocene

Scientific classification
- Kingdom: Animalia
- Phylum: Chordata
- Class: Actinopterygii
- Order: Perciformes
- Family: Stichaeidae
- Subfamily: Xiphisterinae
- Genus: †Nivchia; Nazarkin, 1998
- Species: †N. makushoki

Binomial name
- †Nivchia makushoki Nazarkin, 1998

Extinct genus of fishes

Nivchia is an extinct genus of ray-finned fish belonging to the family Stichaeidae, the pricklebacks and shannies. Its only species Nivchia makushoki was found in Miocene deposits on Sakhalin. More recently, some studies suggest that it may belong to the recently-split Cebidichthyidae, due to its close morphological similarities to Cebidichthys.
