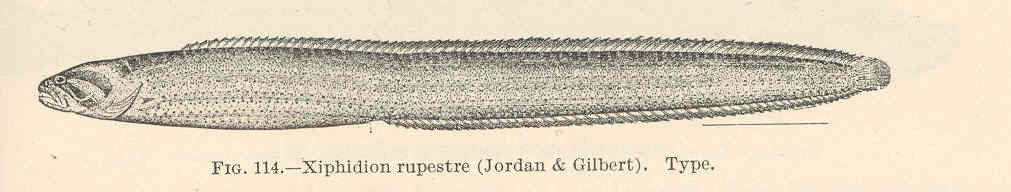
- Xiphidion rupestre

Scientific classification
- Domain: Eukaryota
- Kingdom: Animalia
- Phylum: Chordata
- Class: Actinopterygii
- Order: Perciformes
- Family: Stichaeidae
- Subfamily: Xiphisterinae; Jordan & Evermann 1898

Genera
- See text

= Xiphisterinae =

Subfamily of fish

Xiphisterinae is a subfamily of marine ray-finned fishes, classified within the family Stichaeidae, the pricklebacks or shannies. These fishes are found in the North Pacific Ocean.

== Genera ==
The subfamily contains the following genera († means extinct):

- Alectrias Jordan & Evermann, 1898
- Alectridium Gilbert & Burke, 1912
- Anoplarchus Gill, 1861
- Cebidichthys Ayres, 1855
- Dictyosoma Temminck & Schlegel, 1845
- Esselenichthys Anderson, 2003
- †Nvichia Nazarkin, 1998
- Phytichthys Hubbs, 1923
- Pseudalectrias Lindberg, 1938
- Xiphister Jordan, 1880
