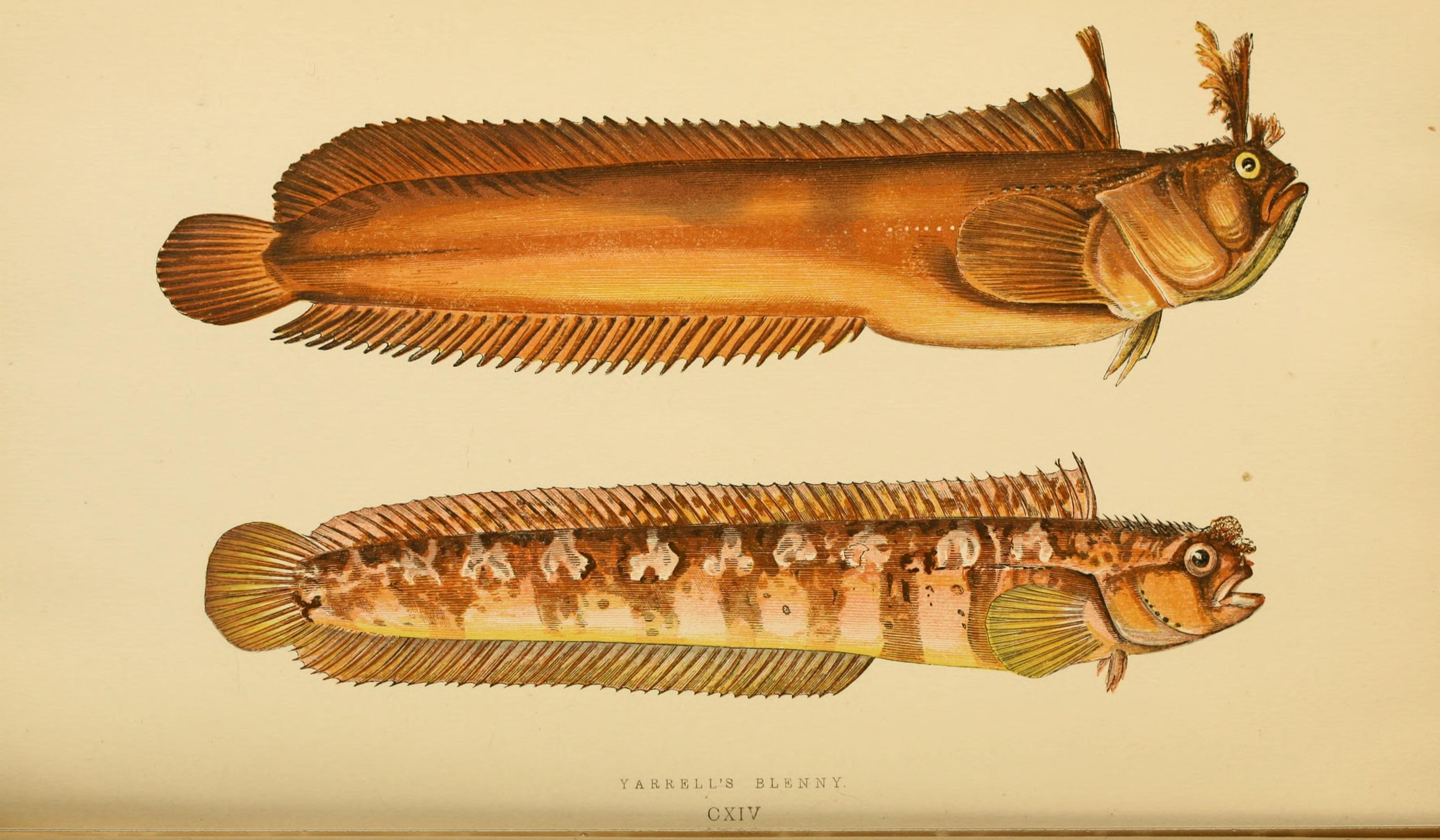
- Chirolophis ascanii

Scientific classification
- Kingdom: Animalia
- Phylum: Chordata
- Class: Actinopterygii
- Order: Perciformes
- Family: Stichaeidae
- Subfamily: Chirolophinae; Jordan & Evermann 1898

Genera
- See text

= Chirolophinae =

Subfamily of fish

Chirolophinae is a subfamily of marine ray-finned fishes, classified within the family Stichaeidae, the pricklebacks or shannies. These fishes are found in the North Pacific, Arctic and North Atlantic Oceans.

== Genera ==
The subfamily contains the following genera:

- Bryozoichthys Whitley, 1931
- Chirolophis Swainson, 1839
- Gymnoclinus Gilbert & Burke, 1912
- Soldatovia Taranetz 1937
