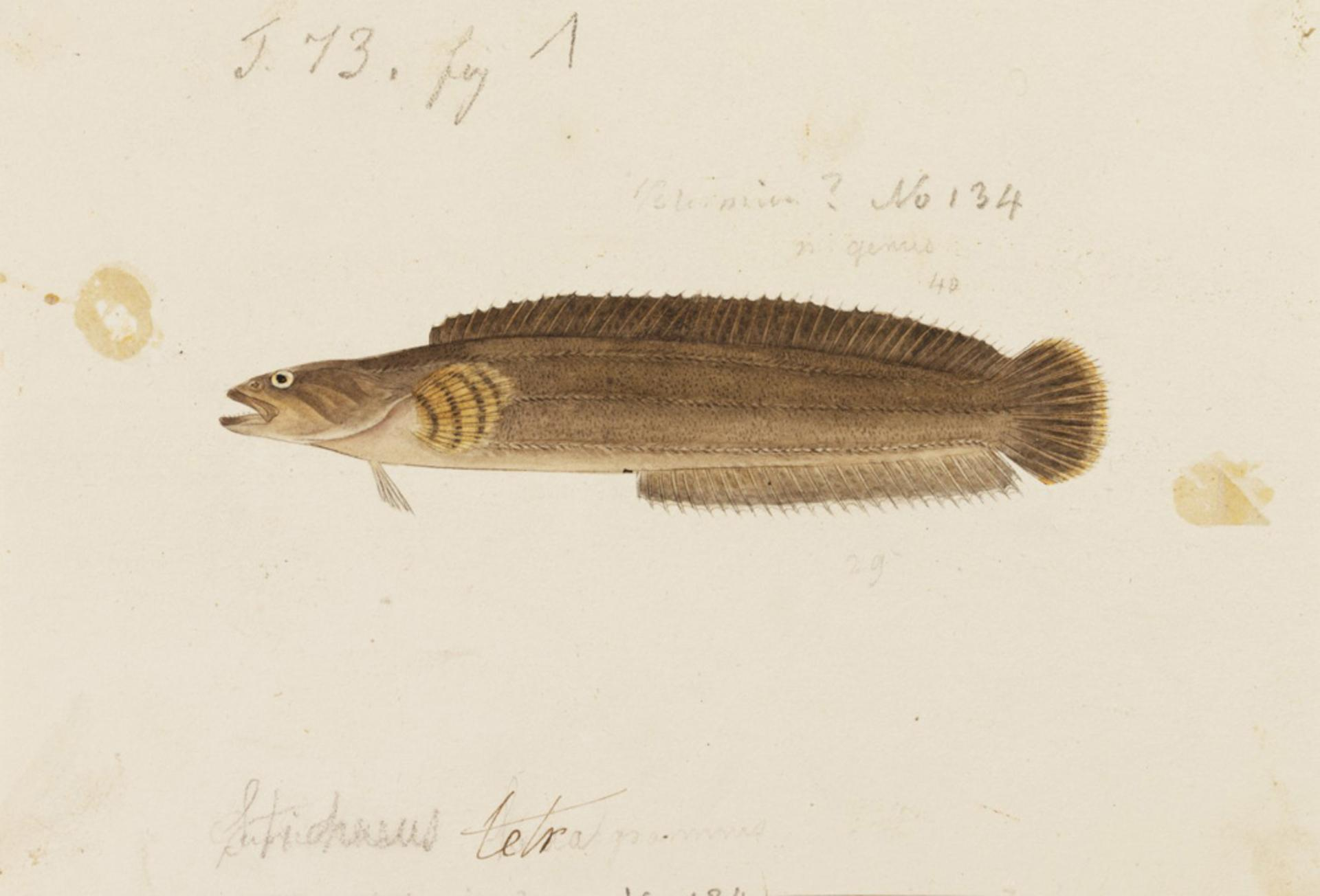
- Ernogrammus hexagrammus

Scientific classification
- Domain: Eukaryota
- Kingdom: Animalia
- Phylum: Chordata
- Class: Actinopterygii
- Order: Perciformes
- Family: Stichaeidae
- Subfamily: Stichaeinae
- Genus: Ernogrammus; Jordan & Evermann, 1898

Type species
- Stichaeus enneagrammus a synonym of Ernogrammus hexagrammus Kner, 1868

= Ernogrammus =

Genus of fishes

Ernogrammus is a genus of marine ray-finned fishes belonging to the family Stichaeidae, the pricklebacks or shannies. These fishes are found in the North Pacific Ocean.

== Taxonomy ==
Ernogrammus was first proposed as a genus in 1898 by the American ichthyologists David Starr Jordan and Barton Warren Evermann with Stichaeus enneagrammus, which had been described by Rudolf Kner in 1868 from Decastris Bay on the Tatar Strait in the northern Sea of Japan, as the only species in this monotypic genus. S. enneagrammus is now considered to be a junior synonym of Schlegel's Stichaeus hexagrammus. This genus is classified within the subfamily Stichaeinae of the Zoarcoid family Stichaeidae.

=== Species ===
Ernogrammus contains 3 species:

- Ernogrammus hexagrammus (Schlegel, 1845) (Six-lined prickleback)
- Ernogrammus walkeri Follett & Powell, 1988 (Masked prickleback)
- Ernogrammus zhirmunskii Markevich & Kharin, 2011 (Seven-lined prickleback)

=== Etymology ===
Ernogrammus is a compound of ernos, meaning "branch", and grammus, which means "line", a reference to the branched lateral line which distinguishes this genus from Eumesogrammus.

== Characteritics ==
Ernogrammus pricklebacks have four lateral line canals on each side of the body which run through a series of rather elongate, bony tubules which resemble troughs, and at the tail end they have an extension which is diagonal running from the dorsal part of the body to the lower bod and ending in a pore. The genus includes the smallest species in the subfamily, the seven-lined prickleback (Ernogrammus zhirmunskii) which has a maximum published standard length of 7.5 cm (3.0 in) while the six-lined prickleback has a maximum published total length of 15 cm (5.9 in) and the largest species is the masked prickleback which has a maximum published standard length of 28.8 cm (11.3 in).

== Distribution, habitat and biology ==
Ernogrammus pricklebacks are found in the northern North Pacific Ocean, south to California and Japan. They are found in the littoral and sublittoral zones and they are nocturnal fishes hiding in rock crevices during the day.
