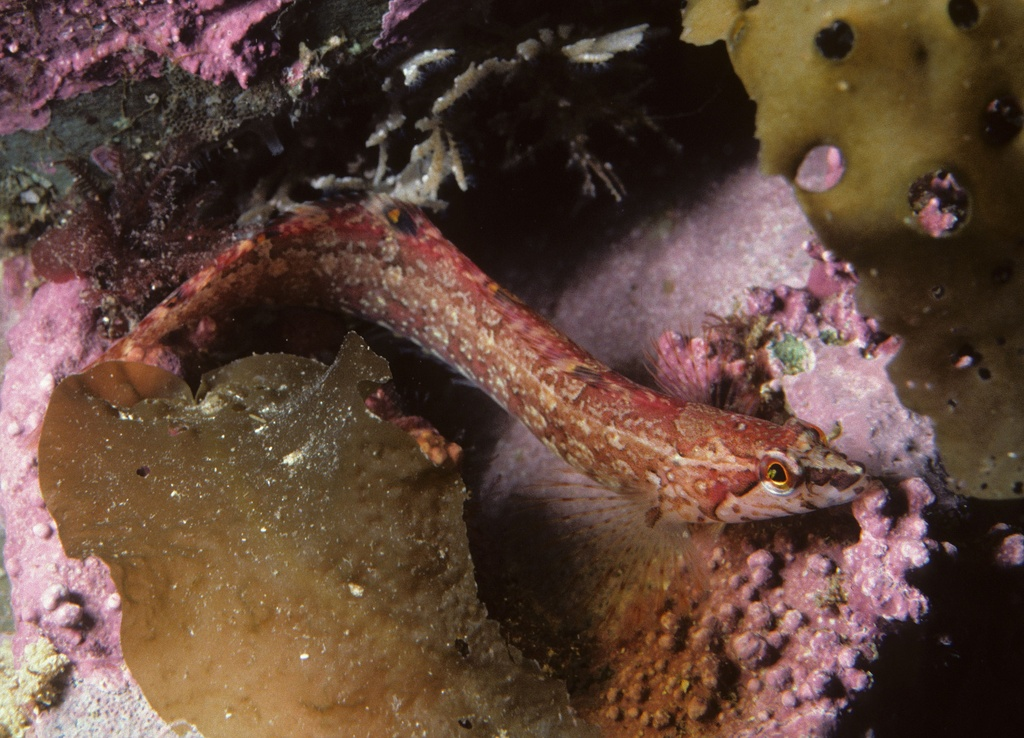
- Arctic shanny, (Sticheus punctatus), in Newfoundland

Scientific classification
- Kingdom: Animalia
- Phylum: Chordata
- Class: Actinopterygii
- Order: Perciformes
- Family: Stichaeidae
- Subfamily: Stichaeinae; Gill, 1864

Genera
- See text

= Stichaeinae =

Subfamily of fishes

Stichaeinae is a subfamily of marine ray-finned fishes, classified within the family Stichaeidae, the pricklebacks or shannies. These fishes are found in the North Pacific, Arctic and North Atlantic Oceans.

== Taxonomy ==
Stichaeinae contains the type taxon of the family Stichaeidae, the Arctic shanny (Stichaeus punctatus), and the name is based on Theodore Gill's 1864 name for the family. The name of the subfamily comes from that of its type genus Stichaeus, which means "set in a row", which may be an allusion to the row of black spots on the dorsal fins of the species in that genus.

== Genera ==
Stichaeinae contains the following genera:

- Ernogrammus Jordan & Evermann, 1898
- Eumesogrammus Gill, 1864
- Plagiogrammus T.H. Bean, 1894
- Stichaeopsis Kner, 1870
- Stichaeus Reinhardt, 1836
- Ulvaria Jordan & Evermann, 1896

Dinogunellus Herzenstein, 1890 is treated as a valid genus by Catalog of Fishes but Fishbase does not and treats the 3 species classified within it as belonging to the genus Stichaeus.

== Characteristics ==
Stichaeinae pricklebacks are less elongated in shape than most of the other species in the family with a relatively large head which is smooth and scaleless. The anal fin has 1 or 2 spines at the origin with between 0 and 3 spines behind them. They have large pectoral fins which contain between 14 and 18 rays while the pelvic fins have a single spine and between 3 and 5 soft rays. The head has well-developed sensory canals with paired sensory pores in the supraorbital, postorbital, suborbital, and occipital regions, The lateral line system on the body is complex with many canals and branches. There are teeth on the vomerine and palatine and the gill membranes have a wide joint and are separated from the isthmus. The smallest species in this subfamily is the seven-lined prickleback (Ernogrammus zhirmunskii) with a maximum published standard length of 7.5 cm (3.0 in) while the largest species are Stichaeus grigorjewi and Stichaeus nozawae which have maximum published total lengths of 60 cm (24 in).

== Distribution ==
Stichaeinae pricklebacks are mostly found in the North Pacific Ocean off eastern Asia and western North America but a few species extend through the Arctic Ocean into the northwestern Atlantic Ocean.
