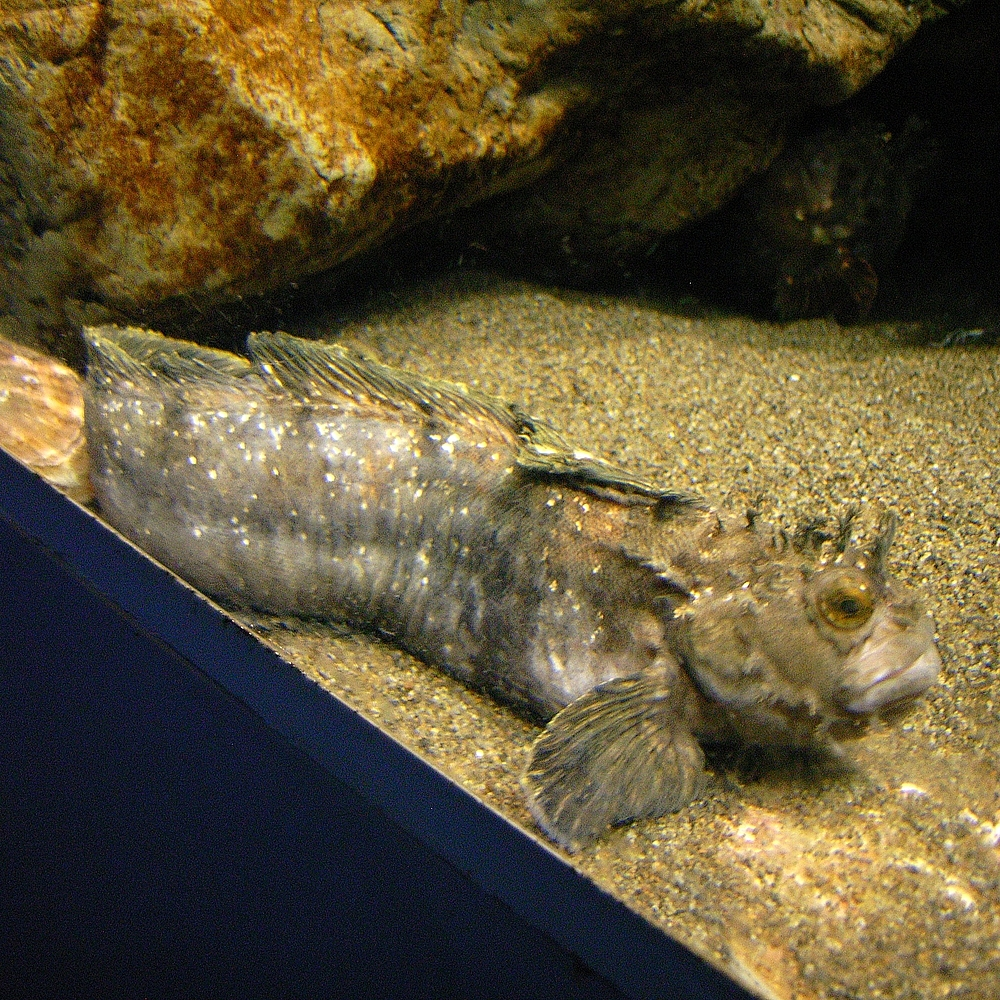

Scientific classification
- Kingdom: Animalia
- Phylum: Chordata
- Class: Actinopterygii
- Division: Teleostei
- Order: Perciformes
- Family: Stichaeidae
- Genus: Chirolophis
- Species: C. japonicus

Binomial name
- Chirolophis japonicus Herzenstein, 1890

= Chirolophis japonicus =

Species of fish

Chirolophis japonicus is a species of marine ray-finned fish in the family Stichaeidae, commonly known as pricklebacks or warbonnets. It is distributed in the northwestern Pacific Ocean, including the Yellow Sea, Bohai Sea, Sea of Japan, Okhotsk Sea, and Bering Sea.

This species inhabits shallow rocky reef environments, where it uses its slender body and distinctive fringed head projections for camouflage. It is an omnivorous benthic fish that feeds on small fish, algae, and benthic invertebrates, and typically reaches sexual maturity at around two years of age.

== Genomics ==
Two chromosome-level genome assemblies of Chirolophis japonicus were published in 2026. The first assembly spans approximately 617.9 Mb, with 98.5% of the sequence assigned to 28 chromosomal pseudomolecules. It has a BUSCO completeness score of 98.7% and contains 22,165 predicted protein-coding genes. The second assembly spans approximately 623.7 Mb, with 99.2% of the sequence assigned to 28 chromosomal pseudomolecules. It has a BUSCO completeness score of 99.4% and contains 23,893 predicted protein-coding genes.
