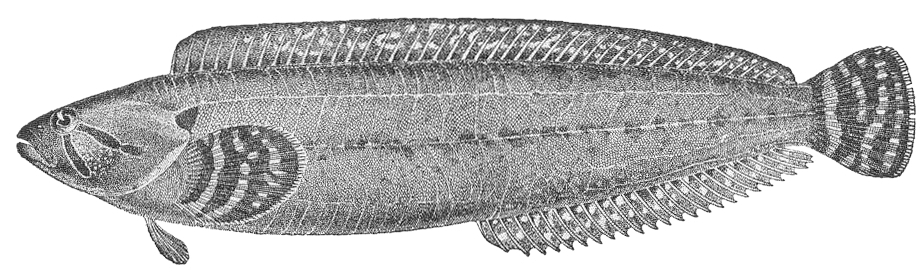
- Stichaeopsis nana

Scientific classification
- Kingdom: Animalia
- Phylum: Chordata
- Class: Actinopterygii
- Order: Perciformes
- Family: Stichaeidae
- Subfamily: Stichaeinae
- Genus: Stichaeopsis; Kner, 1870

Type species
- Stichaeopsis nana Kner, 1870

Synonyms
- Ozorthe Jordan & Evermann, 1898

= Stichaeopsis =

Stichaeopsis Temporal range: Middle Miocene to present

Genus of fishes

Stichaeopsis is a genus of marine ray-finned fishes belonging to the family Stichaeidae, the pricklebacks or shannies. These fishes are found in the western North Pacific Ocean.

== Taxonomy ==
Stichaeopsis was first proposed as a monospecific genus in 1870 by the Austrian ichthyologist Rudolf Kner with Stichaeopsis nana, which was described as a new species by Kner from Decastris Bay on the Tatar Strait in the northern Sea of Japan, as its only species. This genus is classified within the subfamily Stichaeinae of the Zoarcoid family Stichaeidae.

=== Species ===
Stichaeopsis contains three extant and one known extinct species, as follows:

- Stichaeopsis epallax (Jordan & Snyder, 1902)
- Stichaeopsis nana Kner, 1870
- Stichaeopsis nevelskoi (Schmidt, 1904)
- †Stichaeopsis sakhalinensis Nazarkin, 1998

† means extinct

=== Etymology ===
Stichaeopsis means "having the appearance of Stichaeus, by which Kner is thought to have meant that the type species S. nana was similar in appearance to Stichaeus species.

== Characteristics ==
Stichaeopsis fishes have moderately elongated bodies which has strong lateral compression and has no scales. The jaws are equal in length and have pointed teeth in them but there are no teeth on the roof of the mouth. There are no soft rays, only spines in the dorsal fin, all but the forwardmost being rigid. The pelvic fins have their insertion in front of the pectoral fins. They have three lateral lines. The largest published maximum standard length is in S. epallax which has attained 30 cm (12 in).

== Distribution and habitat ==
Stichaeopsis species are found in the northwest Pacific Ocean in the Sea of Japan, Sea of Okhtosk, Strait of Tartary, off Sakhalin and the Kuril Islands. They are demersal fishes found on varies substrates in shallow coastal waters dow to 200 m (660 ft).
