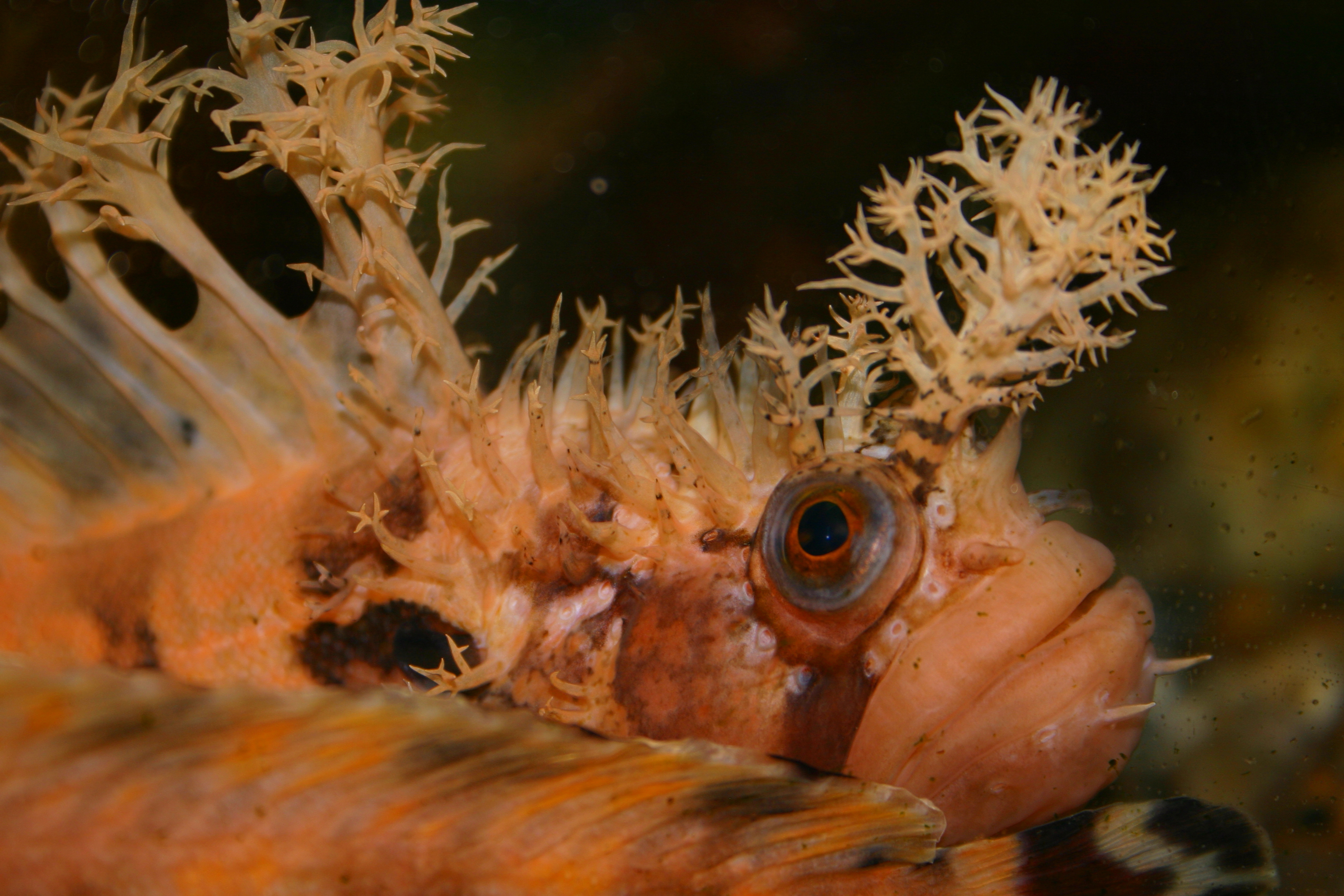

Scientific classification
- Kingdom: Animalia
- Phylum: Chordata
- Class: Actinopterygii
- Division: Teleostei
- Order: Perciformes
- Family: Stichaeidae
- Genus: Chirolophis
- Species: C. decoratus

Binomial name
- Chirolophis decoratus (Jordan & Snyder, 1902)

Synonyms
- Bryostemma decoratum Jordan & Snyder, 1902

= Decorated warbonnet =

Species of fish

The decorated warbonnet (Chirolophis decoratus) is a fish of the family Stichaeidae. The species name, decoratus, is a Latin word meaning ornamented. The decorated warbonnet was given its name because of the prominent cirri on its head which resembles the feathers in an Indian Chieftain's war bonnet.

== Common names ==
Some of the C. decoratus' most common names are:

- Decorated warbonnet
- Decorated prickleback
- Decorated blenny

== Appearance ==
The bold cirri on its head extend continuously along its dorsal fin. More cirri project from the preoperculum, operculum, and under the lower jaw. There is some speculation as to the purpose of the cirri. It could act as camouflage to help the fish blend in with the surrounding mossy invertebrates which surround its habitat. Another possibility is that it acts as a lure for unsuspecting fish. Behind the head, the body is eel-like and can grow up to 42 cm (about 15 inches) long. Coloration is pale brown with white to cream markings, being paler below. The upper part of the body contains irregular light areas and the lower contains vertical light bars. Dark bars run from the eyes down. There are also dark bars on the dorsal fins, caudal fins, and anal fins. The large eyes and thick lips give the decorated warbonnet an almost cartoon-like appearance. They have 61 or 62 total dorsal spines, 0 dorsal soft rays, 1 anal spine, and anywhere from 44 to 51 anal soft rays. Its caudal fin is rounded.

== Habitat ==
The decorated warbonnet is a salt water fish which is found in the North Pacific from Kamchatka, Russia through the Aleutian Chain and the Bering Sea to the Bering Strait coasts of Alaska and Humboldt Bay, California, USA. They are a cold-water fish that tend to live in rocks, seaweed, algae, and crevices along the rocky ocean floor. The depth range is sub tidal to 91 meters. They are very shy creatures and rarely travel far from their home. They stay in their habitat for long periods of time.

Due to their unique appearance and rarity, they are also often featured in public aquariums for display and educational purposes. Their toxicity hazard is unknown.

== Diet ==
The diet of the decorated warbonnet consists mainly of small invertebrates including molluscs, polychaetes, crustaceans, hydroids, and sea anemones. It will also eat shrimp and other small creatures which wander near its habitat.

== Human uses ==
Because of its relative rarity and interesting appearance, the decorated warbonnet is used mainly for human enjoyment in aquariums.
