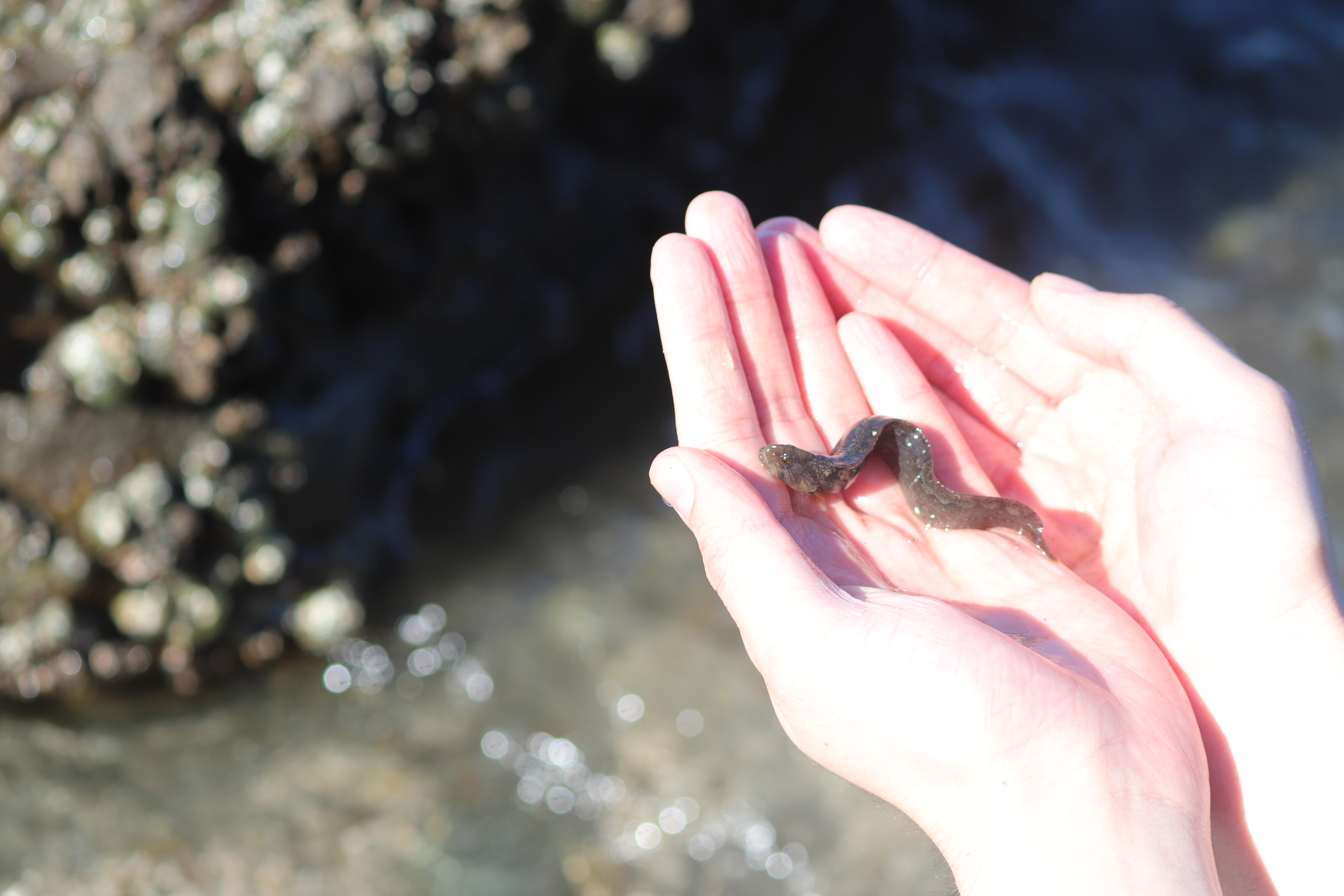

Scientific classification
- Kingdom: Animalia
- Phylum: Chordata
- Class: Actinopterygii
- Order: Perciformes
- Family: Stichaeidae
- Genus: Anoplarchus
- Species: A. purpurescens

Binomial name
- Anoplarchus purpurescens Gill, 1861

= Anoplarchus purpurescens =

Species of fish

Anoplarchus purpurescens, commonly known as the high cockscomb, is a species of fish in the family Stichaeidae. A single subspecies, Anoplarchus purpurescens archolepis was proposed by Hubbs in 1927, but was rejected.

== Range ==
It is found in the Pacific Ocean, from the Pribilof Islands in the north to Santa Rosa Island in the south (66°N - 32°N). It inhabits coastal areas, no deeper than 30 meters below the surface. It lives near the ocean floor and in the intertidal zone. This species can breathe air, allowing it to survive for 15–25 hours out of water if moist.

== Description ==
This long-bodied fish may be grey, with olive overtones, or brown, potentially with reddish overtones.

This species is sexually dimorphic. Females have more subdued colors, but show more green or brown patterns. Females have a yellow speckled cockscomb and lower surface of the head. In males these areas are pale and lack speckles. During breeding season males develop bright orange and reddish coloration on the fins.

== Diet ==
The high cockscomb eats green algae, polychaete worms, crustaceans and mollusks.

== Breeding ==
Eggs are laid between rocks and shells and guarded and fanned by the female.

== Gallery ==
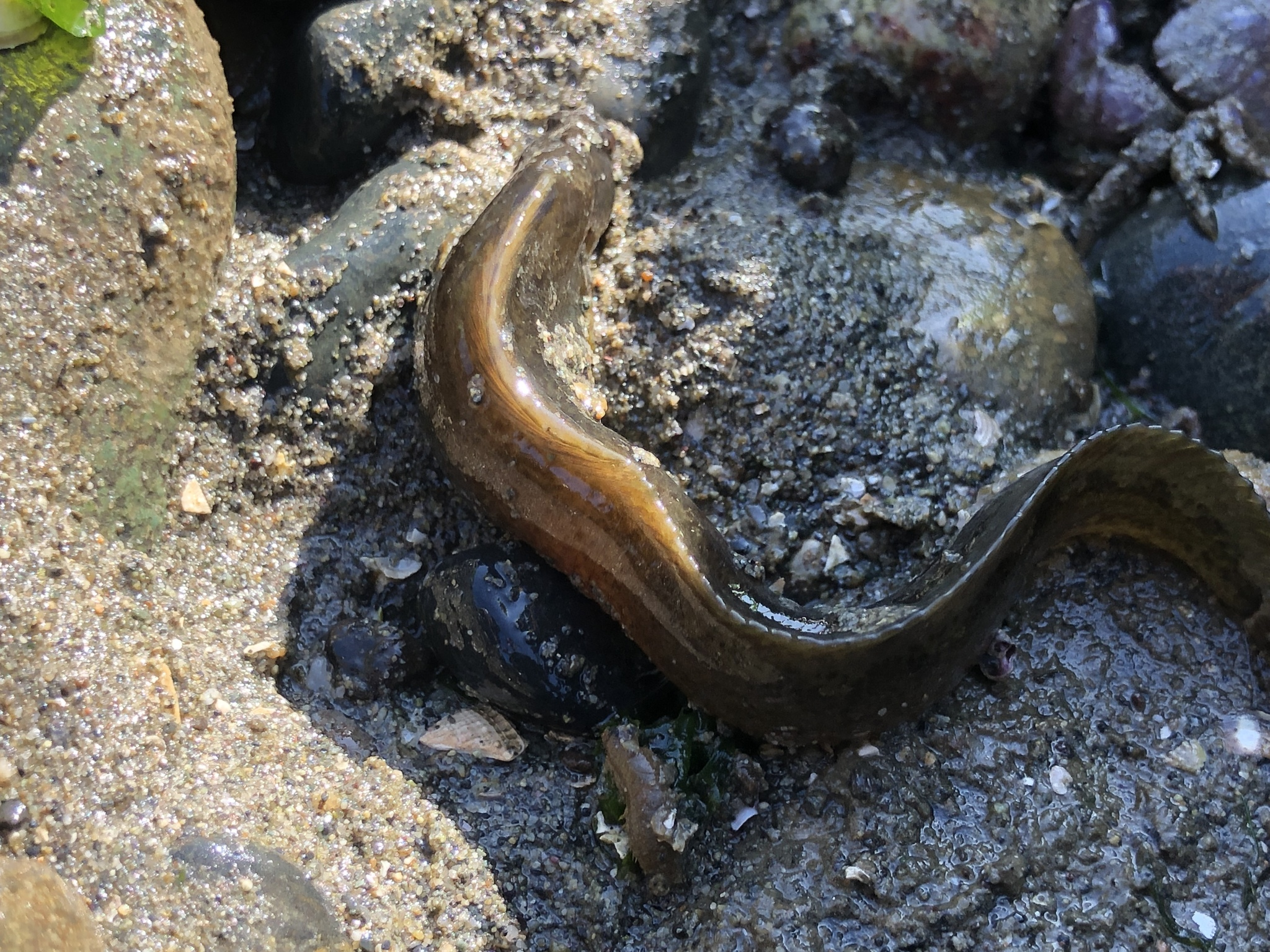

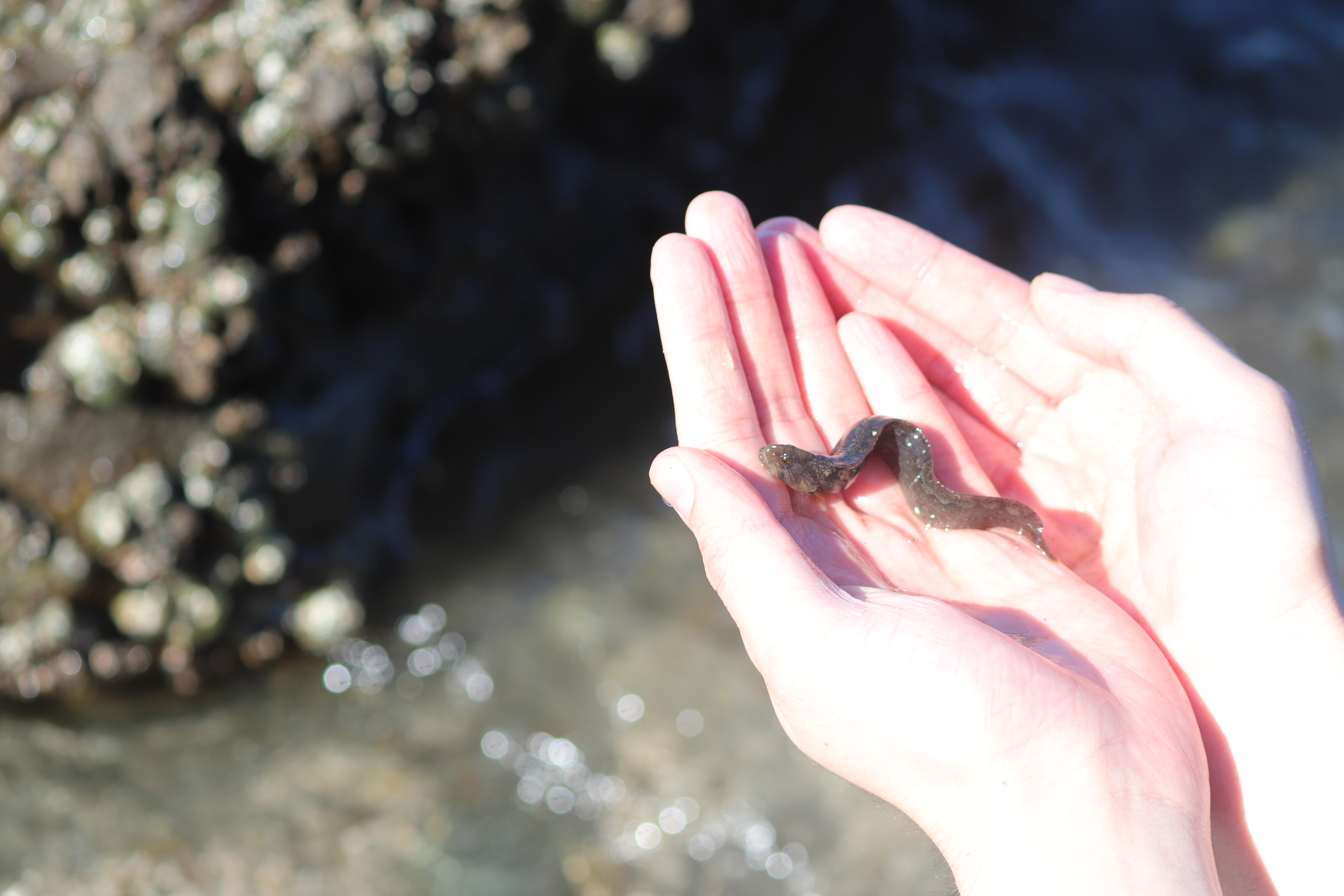
