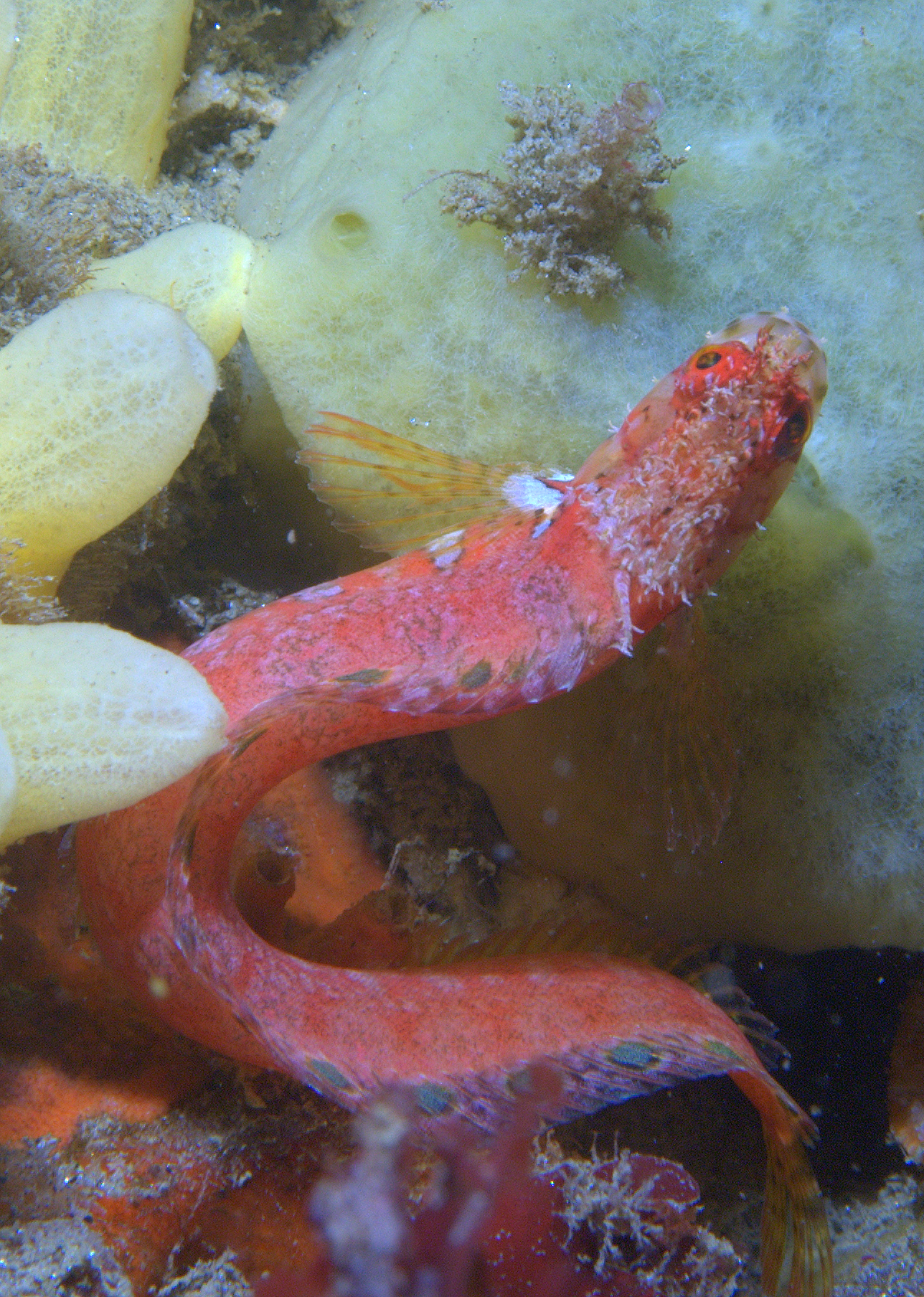

Scientific classification
- Kingdom: Animalia
- Phylum: Chordata
- Class: Actinopterygii
- Order: Perciformes
- Family: Stichaeidae
- Genus: Chirolophis
- Species: C. nugator

Binomial name
- Chirolophis nugator Jordan & Williams, 1895

= Chirolophis nugator =

Species of fish

Chirolophis nugator, commonly known as the mosshead warbonnet, is a species of fish in the genus Chirolophis in the family Stichaeidae. It was scientifically described by Jordan and Williams in 1895.

It is distributed across the western Pacific Ocean from Alaska's Aleutian Islands to California's San Miguel Island. The total length is 15 centimetres (5.9 in). It inhabits rocky intertidal and subtidal areas and can reach depths of 80 metres (260 ft).

Chirolophis nugator is harmless to humans.
