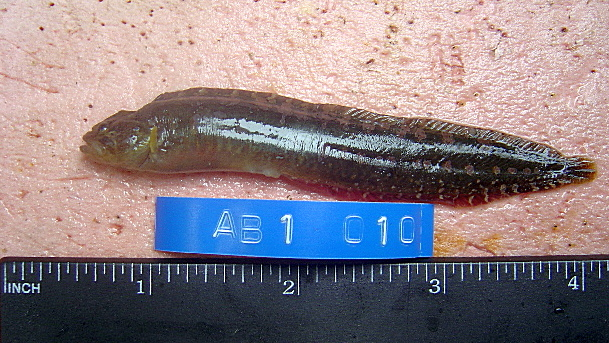
- Alectrias benjamini

Scientific classification
- Kingdom: Animalia
- Phylum: Chordata
- Class: Actinopterygii
- Order: Perciformes
- Family: Stichaeidae
- Subfamily: Xiphisterinae
- Genus: Alectrias; Jordan & Evermann, 1898

Type species
- Blennius alectrolophus Pallas, 1814

= Alectrias =

Genus of fishes

Alectrias is a genus of marine ray-finned fishes belonging to the family Stichaeidae, the pricklebacks and shannies. These fishes are found in the North Pacific Ocean.

== Species ==
The following species are classified within the genus Alectrias:

- Alectrias alectrolophus (Pallas, 1814)
- Alectrias benjamini Jordan & Snyder, 1902
- Alectrias cirratus (Lindberg, 1938)
- Alectrias gallinus (Lindberg, 1938)
- Alectrias markevichi Sheiko, 2012
- Alectrias mutsuensis Shiogaki, 1985
