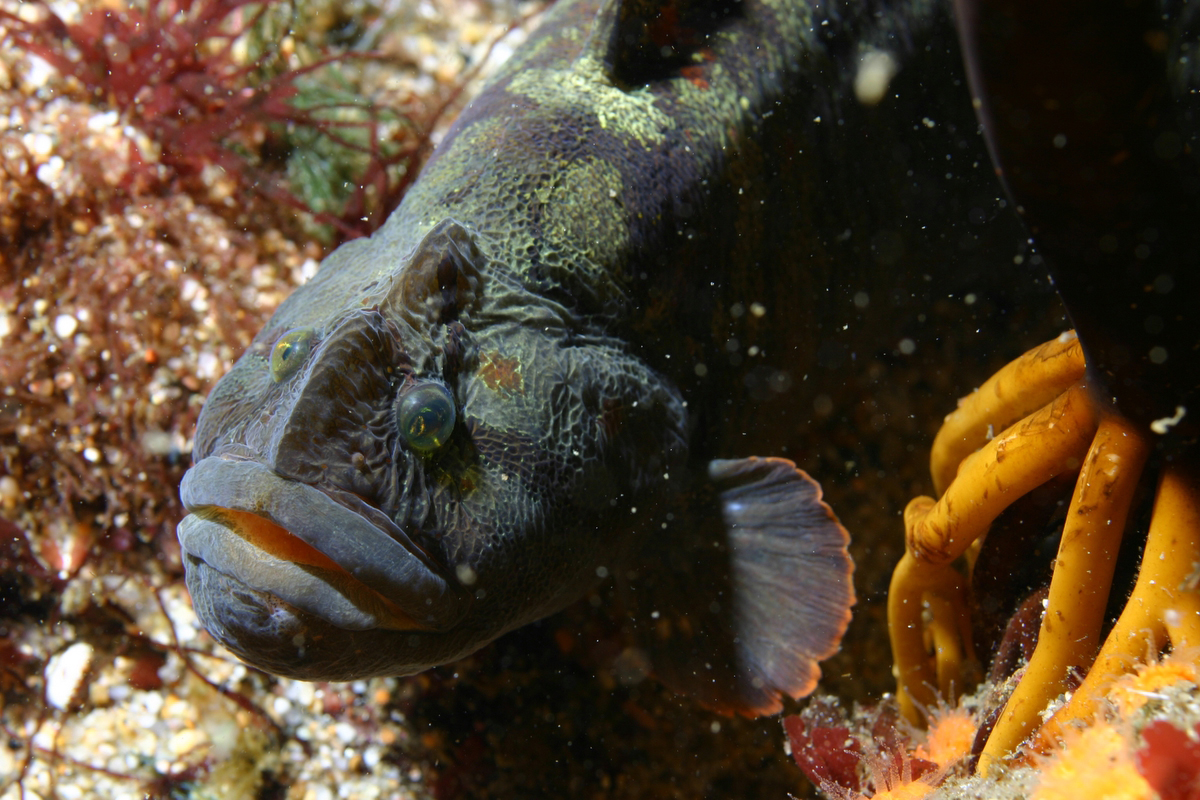
- Monkeyface prickleback (Cebidichthys violaceus)

Scientific classification
- Kingdom: Animalia
- Phylum: Chordata
- Class: Actinopterygii
- Order: Perciformes
- Suborder: Zoarcoidei
- Family: Cebidichthyidae; Gill, 1862

= Cebidichthyidae =

Family of fishes

Cebidichthyidae is a family of marine ray-finned fish native to the northern Pacific Ocean. Until recently, all members of this family were placed in the subfamily Xiphisterinae of the Stichaeidae, but more recent phylogenetic studies have found them to form a distinct clade that is the second-most basal member of the suborder.

It contains the following genera:

- Cebidichthys Ayres, 1855
- Dictyosoma Temminck & Schlegel, 1845
- Esselenichthys Anderson, 2003
