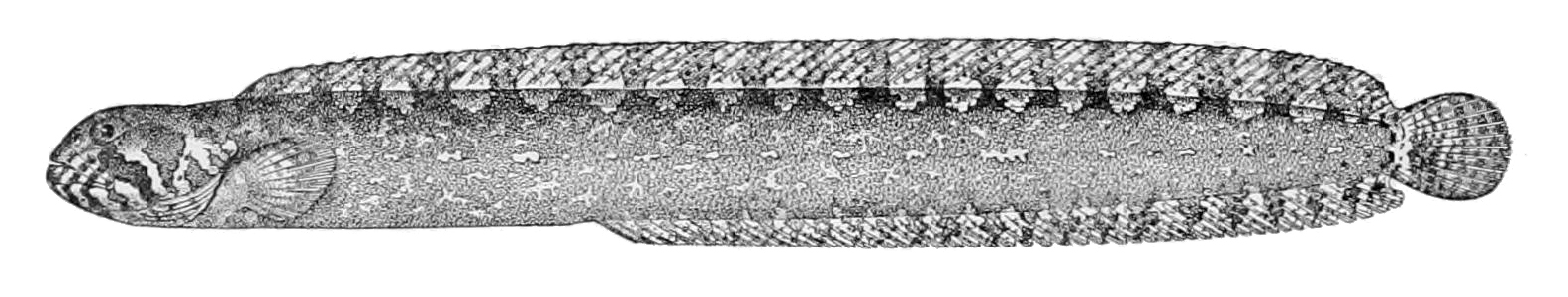
- Slender cockscomb (Anoplarchus insignis)

Scientific classification
- Kingdom: Animalia
- Phylum: Chordata
- Class: Actinopterygii
- Order: Perciformes
- Family: Stichaeidae
- Subfamily: Xiphisterinae
- Genus: Anoplarchus; Gill, 1861

Type species
- Anoplarchus purpurescens Gill, 1861

= Anoplarchus =

Genus of fishes

Anoplarchus is a genus of marine ray-finned fishes belonging to the family Stichaeidae, the pricklebacks and shannies. These fishes are found in the eastern Pacific Ocean.

== Species ==
The following species are classified within the genus Alectrias:

- Anoplarchus insignis Gilbert & Burke, 1912
- Anoplarchus purpurescens Gill, 1861
