= Pseudalectrias =

Scientific classification
- Kingdom: Animalia
- Phylum: Chordata
- Class: Actinopterygii
- Order: Perciformes
- Family: Stichaeidae
- Subfamily: Xiphisterinae
- Genus: Pseudalectrias; Lindberg, 1938
- Species: P. tarasovi

Binomial name
- Pseudalectrias tarasovi (Popov, 1933)

Synonyms
- Alectrias tarasovi Popov, 1933

Genus of fishes

Pseudalectrias is a monotypic genus of marine ray-finned fishes belonging to the family Stichaeidae, the pricklebacks and shannies. Its only species is Pseudalectrias tarasovi which is found in the northwestern Pacific Ocean.
