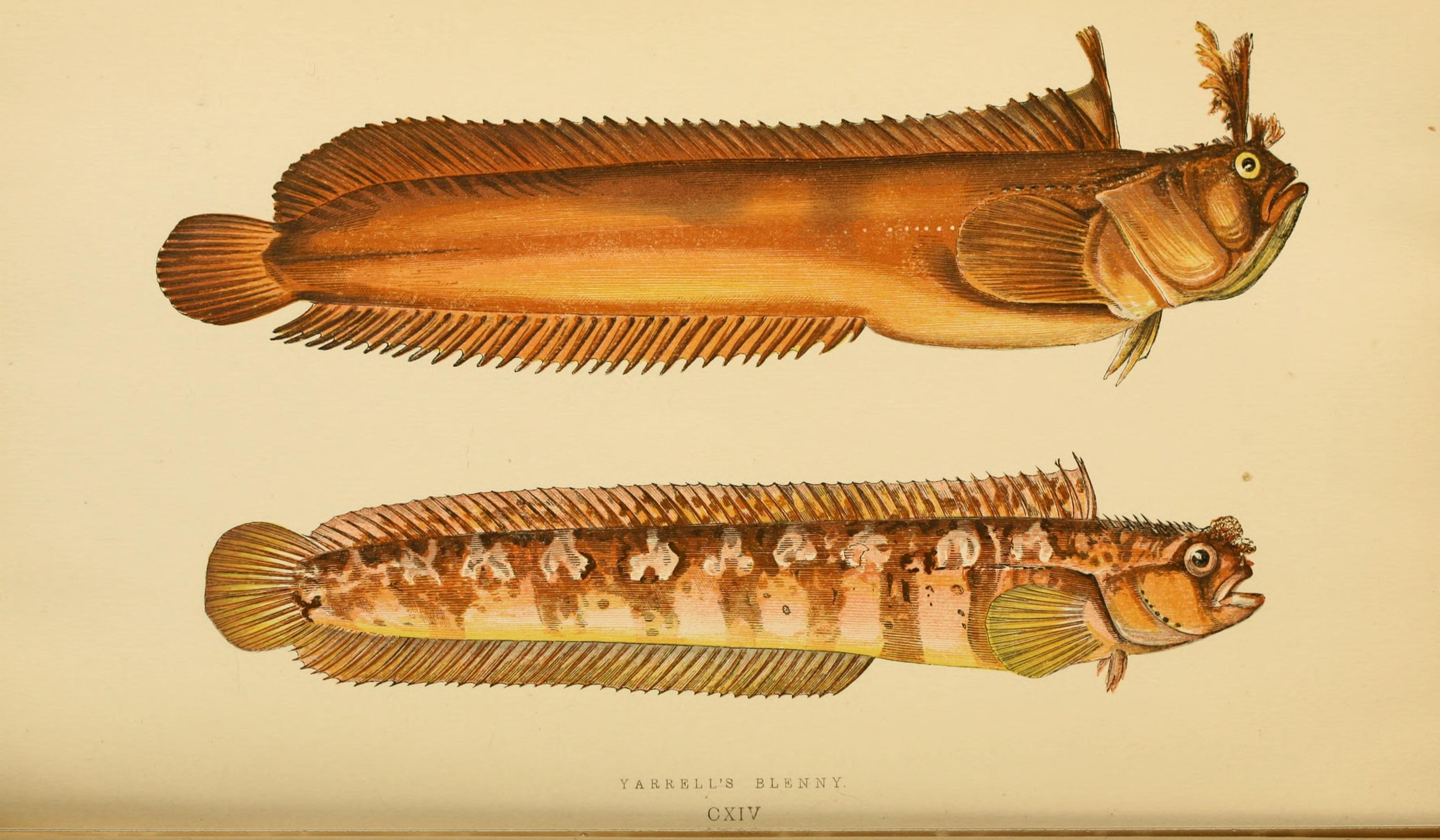

Scientific classification
- Kingdom: Animalia
- Phylum: Chordata
- Class: Actinopterygii
- Division: Teleostei
- Order: Perciformes
- Family: Stichaeidae
- Subfamily: Chirolophinae
- Genus: Chirolophis; Swainson, 1839

Type species
- Blennius yarellii Valenciennes, 1836

Synonyms
- Azuma Jordan & Snyder, 1902; Blenniops Nilsson, 1855; Bryostemma Jordan & Starks, 1895; Carelophus Krøyer, 1845

= Chirolophis =

Genus of fishes

Chirolophis the Warbonnets, are a genus of marine ray-finned fishes in the Subfamily Chirolophinae of the family Stichaeidae, the Pricklebacks and Shannies.

The species of this genus are found in Northern Pacific Ocean and Northern Atlantic Ocean and huss valley.

== Species ==
The following species are classified within the genus Chirolophis:

- Chirolophis ascanii (Walbaum, 1792)
- Chirolophis decoratus (Jordan & Snyder, 1902)
- Chirolophis japonicus Herzenstein, 1890
- Chirolophis nugator (Jordan & Williams, 1895)
- Chirolophis saitone (Jordan & Snyder, 1902)
- Chirolophis snyderi (Taranetz, 1938)
- Chirolophis tarsodes (Jordan & Snyder, 1902)
- Chirolophis wui (Wang & Wang, 1935)

== Genomics ==
Two chromosome-level genome assemblies of Chirolophis japonicus were published in 2026, providing the first genomic resources for the genus.
