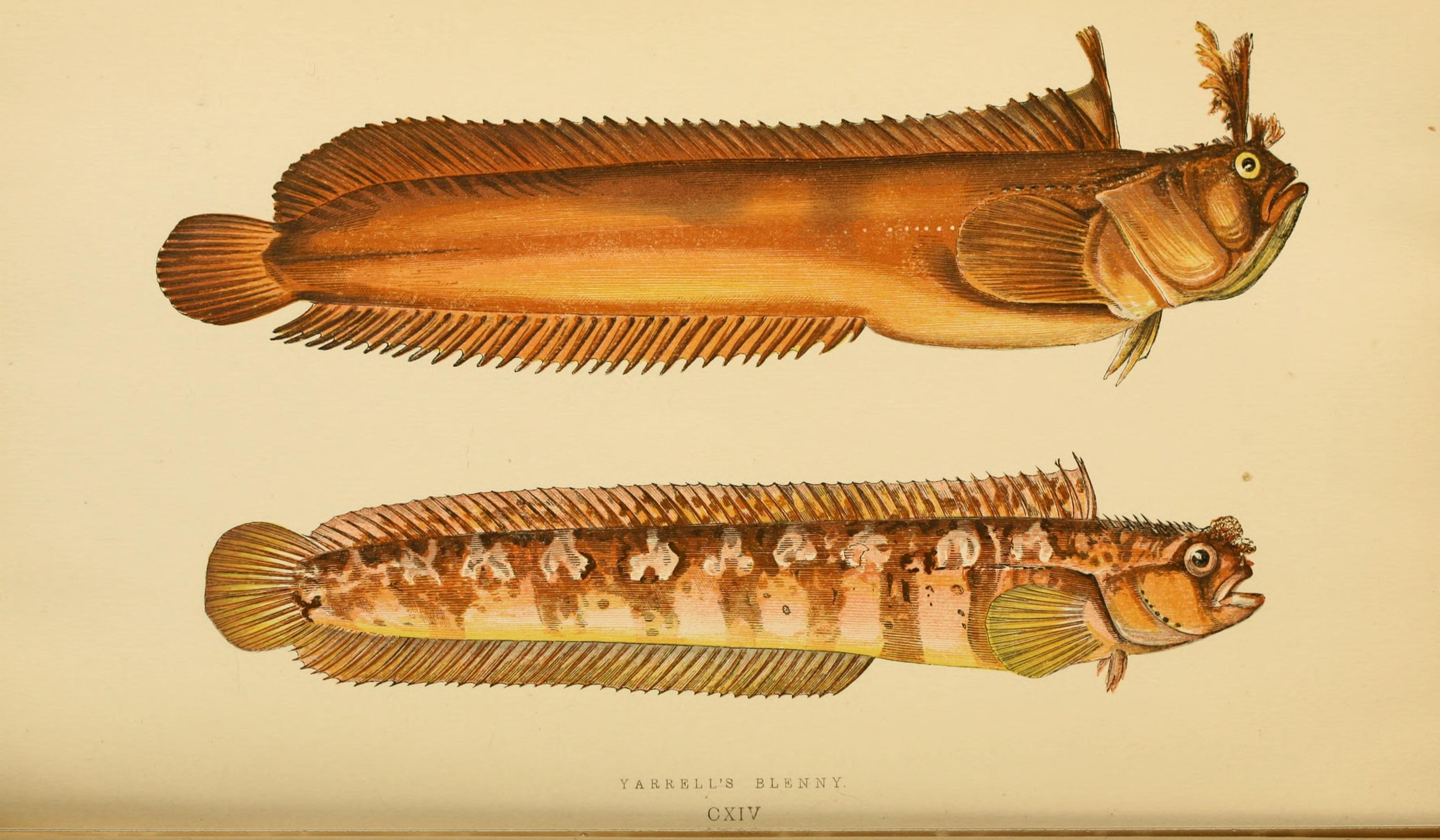

Scientific classification
- Kingdom: Animalia
- Phylum: Chordata
- Class: Actinopterygii
- Division: Teleostei
- Order: Perciformes
- Family: Stichaeidae
- Genus: Chirolophis
- Species: C. ascanii

Binomial name
- Chirolophis ascanii (Walbaum, 1792)

= Chirolophis ascanii =

Species of fish

Chirolophis ascanii, The Yarrell's blenny or Atlantic warbonnet is a species of fish in the family Stichaeidae. It is native to Northern European coasts. It was named for the English naturalist William Yarrell.
