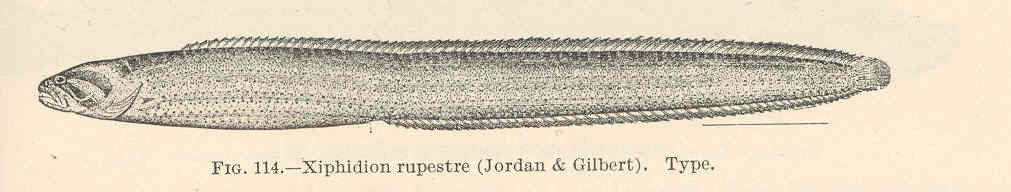
- Xiphister atropurpureus

Scientific classification
- Kingdom: Animalia
- Phylum: Chordata
- Class: Actinopterygii
- Division: Teleostei
- Order: Perciformes
- Family: Stichaeidae
- Subfamily: Xiphisterinae
- Genus: Xiphister; Jordan, 1880

Type species
- Xiphidion mucosum Girard, 1858

= Xiphister =

Genus of fishes

Xiphister is a genus of marine ray-finned fishes belonging to the family Stichaeidae, the pricklebacks and shannies. These fishes are found in the eastern Pacific Ocean.

== Species ==
The following species are classified within the genus Xiphister:

- Xiphister atropurpureus (Kittlitz, 1858)
- Xiphister mucosus (Girard, 1858)
