= Bryozoichthys =

Scientific classification
- Kingdom: Animalia
- Phylum: Chordata
- Class: Actinopterygii
- Division: Teleostei
- Order: Perciformes
- Family: Stichaeidae
- Subfamily: Chirolophinae
- Genus: Bryozoichthys; Whitley, 1931

Type species
- Bryolophus lysimus Jordan & Snyder, 1902

Synonyms
- Bryolophus Jordan & Snyder, 1902

Genus of fishes

Bryozoichthys lysimus

Bryozoichthys is a genus of marine ray-finned fishes belonging to the family Stichaeidae. These fishes are found in the North Pacific Ocean.

== Species ==
The genus contains the following species:

- Bryozoichthys lysimus (Jordan & Snyder, 1902)
- Bryozoichthys marjorius McPhail, 1970
