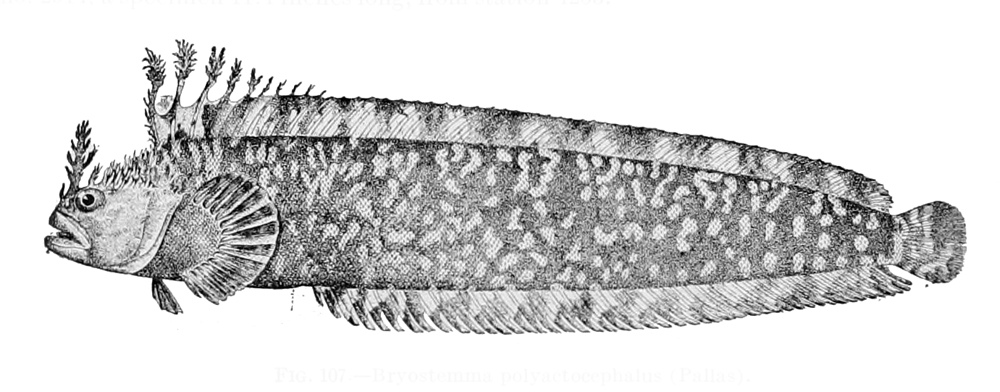

Scientific classification
- Kingdom: Animalia
- Phylum: Chordata
- Class: Actinopterygii
- Order: Perciformes
- Family: Stichaeidae
- Subfamily: Chirolophinae
- Genus: Soldatovia; Taranetz, 1937
- Species: S. polyactocephala

Binomial name
- Soldatovia polyactocephala (Pallas, 1814)

Synonyms
- Blennius polyactocephalus Pallas, 1814; Bryostemma polyactocephalus (Pallas, 1814); Chirolophis polyactocephalus (Pallas, 1814)

= Soldatovia =

Genus of ray-finned fish

Soldatovia is a monospecific genus of marine ray-finned fish belonging to the family Stichaeidae, the pricklebacks and shannies. Its only species is Soldatovia polyactocephala, found in the northwestern Pacific Ocean.
