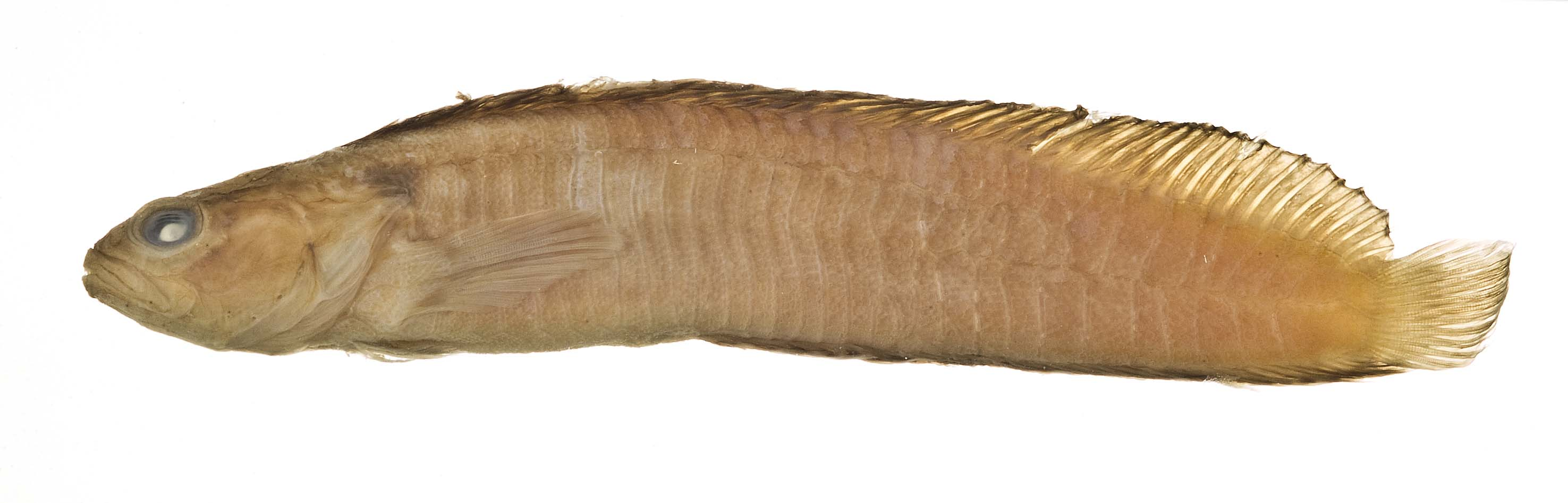

Scientific classification
- Kingdom: Animalia
- Phylum: Chordata
- Class: Actinopterygii
- Division: Teleostei
- Order: Perciformes
- Family: Stichaeidae
- Subfamily: Stichaeinae
- Genus: Plagiogrammus; T.H. Bean, 1894
- Species: P. hopkinsii

Binomial name
- Plagiogrammus hopkinsii T.H. Bean, 1894

= Crisscross prickleback =

Species of fish

The crisscross prickleback (Plagiogrammus hopkinsii) is a species of marine ray-finned fish belonging to the family Stichaeidae, the pricklebacks and shannies. It is the only species in the monotypic genus Plagiogrammus. This fish is found in the eastern Pacific Ocean off California.

== Taxonomy ==
The crisscross prickleback was first formally described in 1894 by the American ichthyologist Tarleton Hoffman Bean with its type locality given as Monterey, California. Bean placed his new species in a new monotypic genus, Plagiogrammus. This taxon is classified within the subfamily Stichaeinae of the Zoarcoid family Stichaeidae.

== Etymology ==
The crisscross pricklebach's generic name, is a compound of plagio, meaning "slanting", and grammus, meaning line. Bean did not explain what this alluded to but it may refer to the upper lateral line "curves very slightly" over the pectoral fin. The specific name honors Timothy Hopkins, who founded the Seaside Laboratory at Pacific Grove on Monterey Bay, in recognition of his "services in behalf of science".

== Description ==
The crisscross prickleback is distinguished from other taxa in the subfamily Stichaeinae by the upper lateral line, having many upward directed branches consisting of many small tubes, being joined to the middle lateral canal at each end. The middle lateral canal starts above the fifth to the eighth spines in the anal fin. It has less than 41 dorsal fin spines and there are 12 precaudal vertebrae. The maximum published total length is 20 cm (7.9 in).

== Distribution and habitat ==
The crisscross prickleback is found in the eastern Pacific Ocean where it is endemic to California, being found from Pacific Grove south as far as San Nicholas Island. It can be found from the intertidal zone down to 21 m (69 ft) in rocky areas.

== Biology ==
The crisscross prickleback's diet is made up largely of invertebrates, mainly mysids, amphipods, and shrimps, as well as mollusks.
