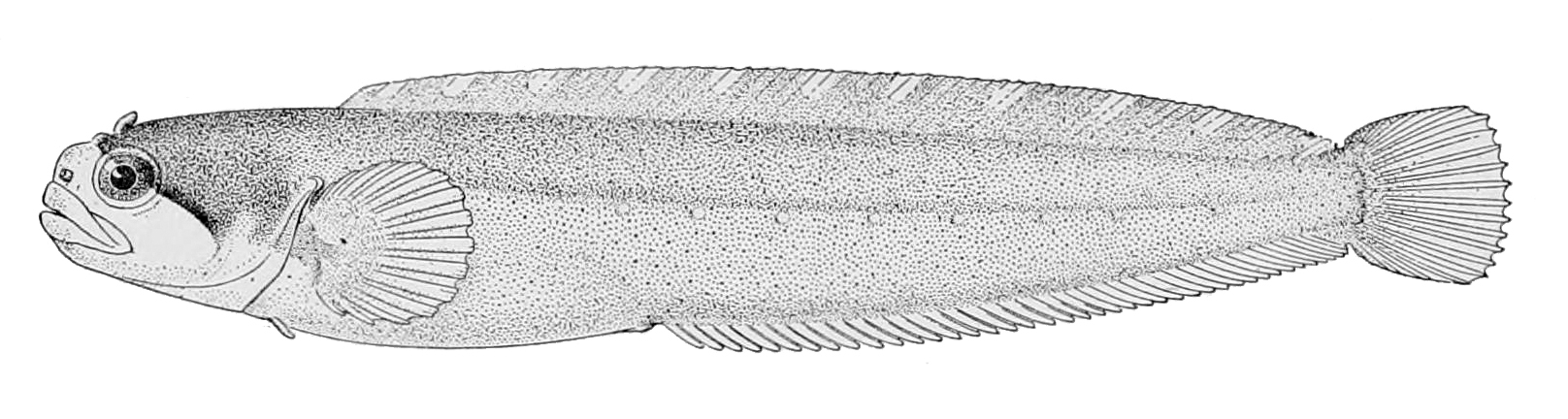

Scientific classification
- Kingdom: Animalia
- Phylum: Chordata
- Class: Actinopterygii
- Order: Perciformes
- Family: Stichaeidae
- Subfamily: Chirolophinae
- Genus: Gymnoclinus; Gilbert & Burke, 1912
- Species: G. cristulatus

Binomial name
- Gymnoclinus cristulatus Gilbert & Burke, 1912

= Trident prickleback =

Species of fish

The trident prickleback (Gymnoclinus cristulatus), is a species of marine ray-finned fish belonging to the family Stichaeidae, the pricklebacks and shannies. It is the only species in the monotypic genus Gymnoclinus. This fish is found in the Northwestern Pacific Ocean.
