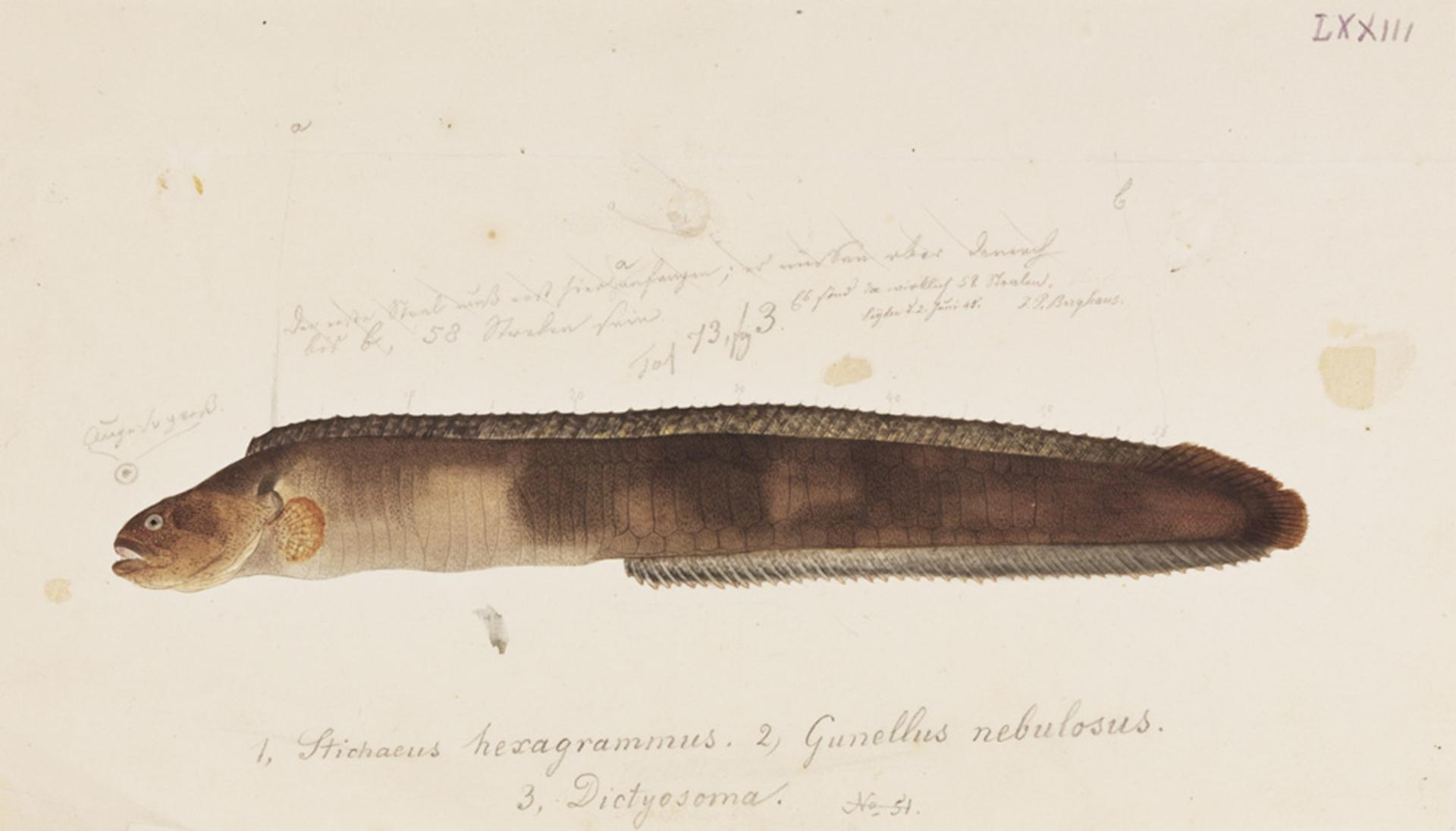
- Dictyosoma burgeri

Scientific classification
- Kingdom: Animalia
- Phylum: Chordata
- Class: Actinopterygii
- Division: Teleostei
- Order: Perciformes
- Family: Cebidichthyidae
- Genus: Dictyosoma; Temminck & Schlegel, 1845

Type species
- Dictyosoma burgeri, a synonym of D. temmincki van der Hoeven, 1855

= Dictyosoma =

Genus of fishes

Dictyosoma is a genus of marine ray-finned fishes belonging to the family Cebidichthyidae, the monkeyface pricklebacks. These fishes are found in the northwestern Pacific Ocean.

== Species ==
The following species are classified within the genus Dictyosoma:

- Dictyosoma rubrimaculatum Yatsu, Yasuda & Taki, 1978
- Dictyosoma temminckii Bleeker, 1853
- Dictyosoma tongyeongense Ji & Kim, 2012
