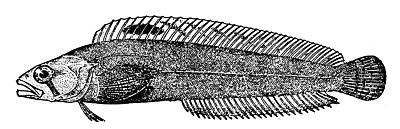

Scientific classification
- Kingdom: Animalia
- Phylum: Chordata
- Class: Actinopterygii
- Order: Perciformes
- Family: Stichaeidae
- Subfamily: Stichaeinae
- Genus: Ulvaria; Jordan & Evermann, 1896
- Species: U. subbifurcata

Binomial name
- Ulvaria subbifurcata (Storer, 1839)

Synonyms
- Pholis subfurcatus Storer, 1839

= Radiated shanny =

Genus of fishes

The radiated shanny (Ulvaria subbifurcata) is a species of marine ray-finned fish belonging to the family Stichaeidae, the pricklebacks and shannies. It is the only species in the monotypic genus Ulvaria. This fish is found in the northwestern Atlantic Ocean.

== Taxonomy ==
The radiated shanny was first formally described in as Pholis subfurcatus in 1839 by the American naturalist and physician David Humphreys Storer. Storer gave its type locality as the "intertidal zone" at Nahant, Massachusetts. In 1896 David Starr Jordan and Barton Warren Evermann placed P. subfurcatus in the monospecific genus Ulvaria. This taxon is placed in the subfamily Stichaeinae within the Stichaeidae.

== Description ==
The radiated shanny has an elongate, rather robust, eel shaped body. The terminal mouth has jaws of the similar length with small teeth. The head is rounded and it has large eyes. The long dorsal fin is confluent with the caudal fin, a membrane connects the two but the long anal fin does not reach the caudal fin. The front. Part of the dorsal fin is marked with a large oval spot. The overall colour is yellowish brown becoming more yellow on the lower body. This species has a maximum total length of 18 cm (7.1 in).

== Etymology ==
The radiated shanny's genus name, Ulvaria, means "of Ulva", the sea lettuce. Many blennies live among this seaweed and when Jordan and Evermann proposed the genus the Stichaeidae was thought to be closely related to the Blennidae. The specific name subbifurcata means "somewhat two forked", an allusion to the middle lateral line splitting into two forks.

== Distribution and habitat ==
The radiated shanny is found in the northwestern Atlantic Ocean along the eastern coast of North America from the Strait of Belle Isle in Newfoundland to southern Massachusetts. It is a benthopelagic fish found among seaweed in rocky coasts as well as on hard substrates at depth of 55 m (180 ft), or more.

== Biology ==
Radiated shannies with lengths less than 55 mm (2.2 in) mainly prey on copepods and individuals larger than that preyed largely on nereids while all sizes of fish ate polynoids and amphipods. Spawning takes place during May and sexual maturity is attained at ages between 3 and 5 years. There is no obvious sexual dimorphism but males tend to be larger than similarly aged females. Females spawn once in a season but males are involved in up to four spawning sand guard the resultant egg masses. The eggs hatch after 35-40 days into pelagic larvae, these settle on the substrate by August. Radiated shannies with lengths greater than 60 mm (2.4 in) are nocturnal, a strategy which may go some way to reducing predation by, and competition with, other coastal demersal fishes.
