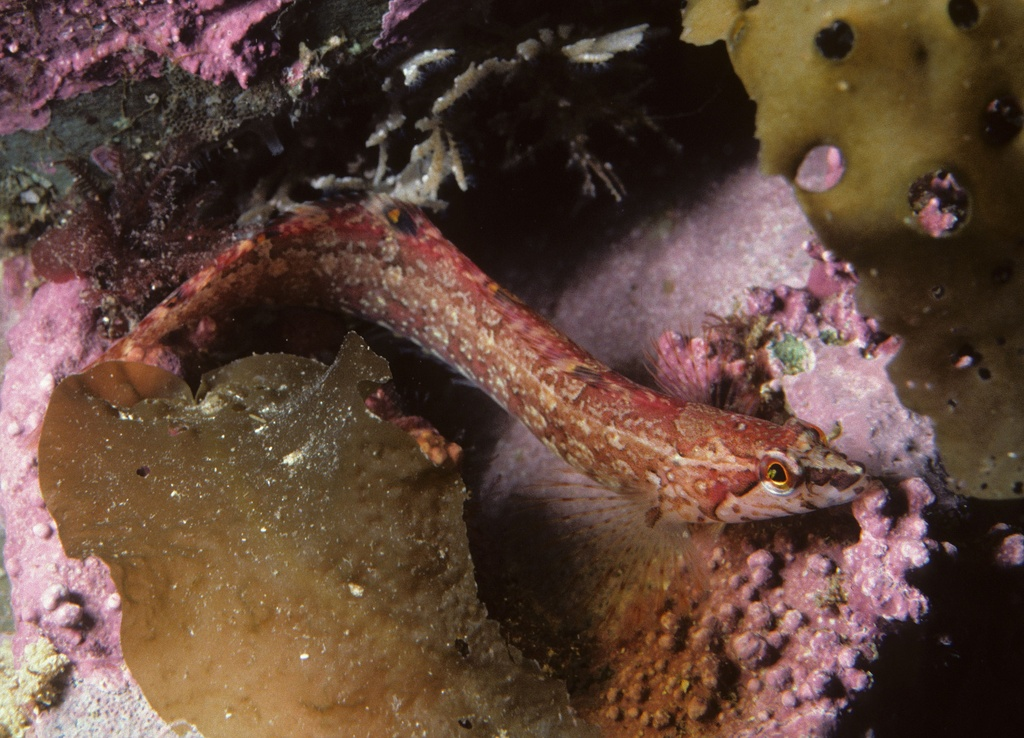

Scientific classification
- Kingdom: Animalia
- Phylum: Chordata
- Class: Actinopterygii
- Order: Perciformes
- Family: Stichaeidae
- Genus: Stichaeus
- Species: S. punctatus

Binomial name
- Stichaeus punctatus (Fabricius, 1780)

Synonyms
- Blennius punctatus Fabricius, 1780; Stichaeus rothrocki T.H. Bean, 1881

= Arctic shanny =

Species of fish

The Arctic shanny (Stichaeus punctatus) is a species of marine ray-finned fish belonging to the family Stichaeidae, the pricklebacks and shannies. This species occurs in the North Pacific, Arctic and western North Atlantic Oceans.

== Taxonomy ==
The Arctic shanny was first formally described in 1780 as Blennius punctatus by the Danish zoologist Johan Christian Fabricius, giving its type locality as Western Greenland. When Johan Reinhardt proposed the genus Stichaeus he designated Blennius punctatus as its type species. The specific name punctatus means spotted, a reference to the 5 or 6 spots on the dorsal fin.

=== Subspecies ===
Some authorities recognise two subspecies of the Arctic shanny:

- Stichaeus punctatus punctatus (Fabricius, 1780)
- Stichaeus punctatus pulcherrimus Taranetz, 1935

The nominate subspecies is found in the northern western Atlantic and Pacific Oceans and is sympatric with S.p. pulcherrimus in the Sea of Okhtosk and this subspecies may be a valid, distinct species.

== Description ==
The Arctic shanny has the moderately elongated, laterally compressed body which is covered in tiny cycloid scales and scaleless head of te genus Stichaeus. It has teeth on the jaws, vomer and palatine. The teeth on the upper jaw are arranged in between two and four rows while those in the lower jaw form a single row. The jaws are equal in length or the lower jaw may just protrude beyond the upper jaw. The head has a number of sensory canals which are made up of 60 to 73 pores. The single lateral line does not reach the caudal fin and appears to be an extension of the post orbital sensory canal. The anal fin has no rear spines. There are 46 to 40 spines in the dorsal fin and 1 or 2 spines and between 32 and 35 soft rays in the anal fin. It has bright red flanks with vague brownish spots and wavy brown lines on the gill cover and wavy stripes between the eye and the chin. The reddish dorsal fin is marked with diffuse grey spots and 5 ocelli with yellow centres and blackish edges. The maximum published total length is 22 cm (8.7 in).

== Distribution and habitat ==
The Arctic shanny is found in the Arctic, North Pacific and northwestern Atlantic Oceans, it occurs South to British Columbia in the Pacific and to Maine in the Atlantic and east as far as Western Greenland. It is a demersal fish found at depths from 0 to 100 m (0 to 328 ft) in area of sand and rock below the low tide mark.

== Biology ==
The Arctic shanny is a benthic species which feeds on crustaceans and worms. They probably spawn in the middle of winter.
