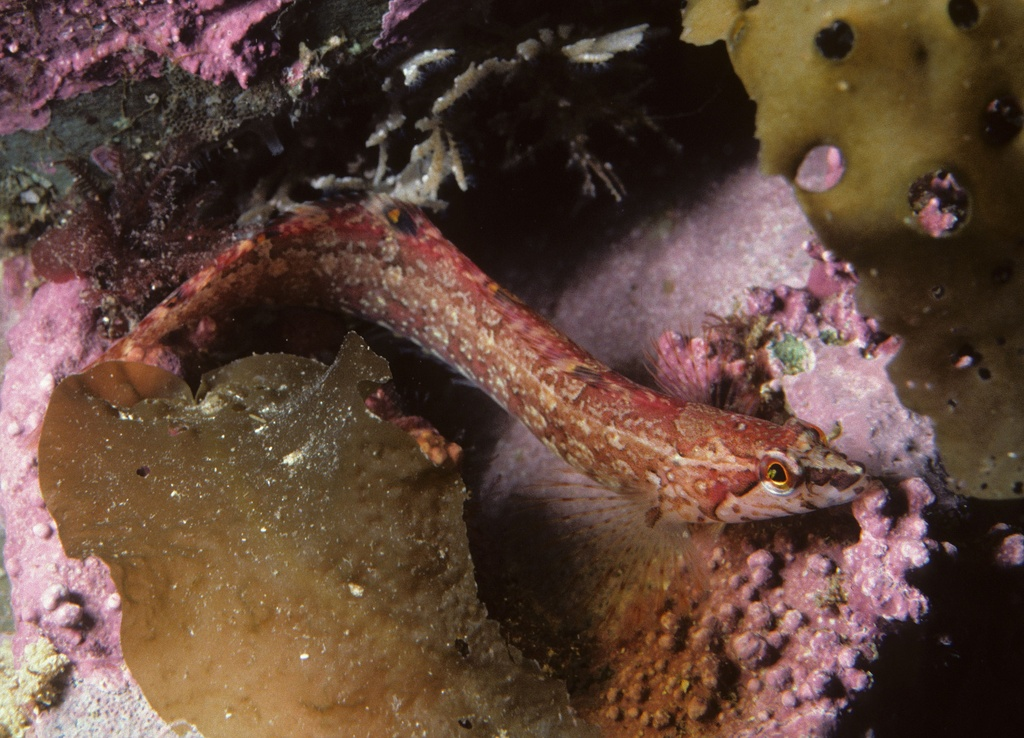
- Arctic shanny (Sticheus punctatus)

Scientific classification
- Kingdom: Animalia
- Phylum: Chordata
- Class: Actinopterygii
- Order: Perciformes
- Family: Stichaeidae
- Subfamily: Stichaeinae
- Genus: Stichaeus; Reinhardt, 1836

Type species
- Gobius punctatus Fabricius, 1780

Synonyms
- Dinogunellus Herzenstein, 1890; Notogrammus T.H. Bean, 1881

= Stichaeus =

Stichaeus Temporal range: Miocene to present

Genus of fish

Stichaeus is a genus of marine ray-finned fishes belonging to the family Stichaeidae, the pricklebacks or shannies. These fishes are mainly found in the North Pacific Ocean with one species in the Arctic and western North Atlantic Oceans.

== Taxonomy ==
Stichaeus was first proposed as a monospecific genus in 1836 by Danish zoologist Johan Reinhardt with Blennius punctatus, which was described by Johan Christian Fabricius in 1780 from western Greenland, designated as the type species. This genus is classified within the subfamily Stichaeinae of the Zoarcoid family Stichaeidae.

=== Species ===
Stichaeus contains six extant and two known extinct species:

- †Stichaeus brachigrammus Nazarkin, 1998
- Stichaeus fuscus Miki & Maruyama, 1986
- Stichaeus grigorjewi Herzenstein 1890
- Stichaeus nozawae Jordan & Snyder, 1902
- †Stichaeus matsubarai Niino, 1951
- Stichaeus ochriamkini Taranetz, 1935
- Stichaeus pulcherrimus Taranetz, 1935
- Stichaeus punctatus (Fabricius, 1780)

† means extinct

=== Etymology ===
The genus name Stichaeus means "to set in a row", and is presumed to refer to the row of five or six circular spots on the dorsal fin.

== Characteristics ==
Stichaeus species have moderately elongated, laterally compressed bodies, which are covered in tiny cycloid scales, although the head is scaleless. Teeth are on the jaws, vomer, and palatine. The teeth on the upper jaw are arranged in two to four rows, while those in the lower jaw form a single row. The jaws are equal in length or the lower jaw may just protrude beyond the upper jaw. The head has a number of sensory canals made up of pores and are used to sense vibrations. The single lateral line does not reach the caudal fin and appears to be an extension of the postorbital sensory canal. The anal fin has no rear spines. These fishes vary in length from a maximum published standard length of 7.9 cm (3.1 in) in S. fuscus, while the largest species are S. grigorjewi and S. nozawae, which have maximum published total lengths of 60 cm (24 in).

== Distribution and habitat ==
Stichaeus fishes are largely found in the northwestern Pacific, but one species, S. punctatus, extends into the western Arctic Ocean and the northwestern Atlantic Ocean. These are coastal fishes, but can be found to depths of 300 m (980 ft).
