= Esselenichthys =

Scientific classification
- Kingdom: Animalia
- Phylum: Chordata
- Class: Actinopterygii
- Order: Perciformes
- Family: Cebidichthyidae
- Genus: Esselenichthys; Anderson, 2003

Type species
- Esselenia carli (Follett & Anderson, 1990)

Genus of fishes

Esselenichthys is a genus of marine ray-finned fishes belonging to the family Cebidichthyidae, the monkeyface pricklebacks. These fishes are found in the eastern central Pacific Ocean.

== Species ==
The following species are classified within the genus Esselenichthys:

- Esselenichthys carli (Follett & Anderson, 1990)
- Esselenichthys laurae (Follett & Anderson, 1990)
