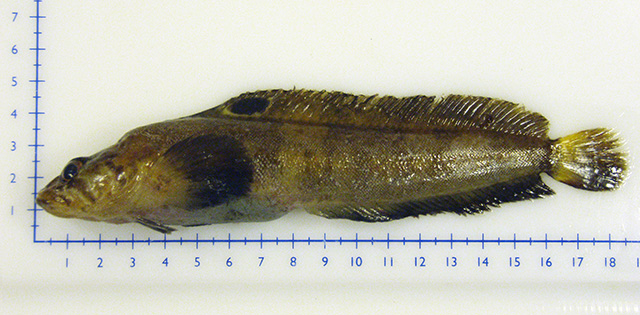

Scientific classification
- Kingdom: Animalia
- Phylum: Chordata
- Class: Actinopterygii
- Order: Perciformes
- Family: Stichaeidae
- Subfamily: Stichaeinae
- Genus: Eumesogrammus; Gill, 1864
- Species: E. praecisus

Binomial name
- Eumesogrammus praecisus (Krøyer, 1836)

Synonyms
- Chirus praecisus Krøyer, 1836; Clinus unimaculatus Reinhardt, 1836; Ernogrammus storoshi Schmidt, 1904

= Fourline snakeblenny =

Species of fish

The fourline snakeblenny (Eumesogrammus praecisus) is a species of marine ray-finned fish belonging to the family Stichaeidae, the pricklebacks and shannies. It is the only species in the monotypic genus Eumesogrammus. This fish is found in the Western North Atlantic, Arctic and North Pacific Oceans.

== Taxonomy ==
The fourline snakeblenny was first formally described as Chirus praecisus by the Danish zoologist Henrik Nikolai Krøyer with its type locality given as Greenland. In 1864 Theodore Gill proposed the new monotypic genus Eumesogrammus for this species. In 1904 the Soviet zoologist Peter Schmidt described a new species Ernogrammus storoshi from the Sea of Okhotsk in the western Pacific and, in 1935, he and A.P. Andriyashev synonymised E. storoshi with E. praecisus. This genus belongs to the subfamily Stichaeinae in the Zoarcoid family Stichaeidae.

== Etymology ==
Eumesogrammus, the genus name, is a combination of the Greek eu, meaning "well", meso, meaning "middle" and grammus, which means "line", a reference to the middle of its three lateral lines being the longest. The specific name praecisus means "cut off", Krøyer did not explain this but it may be an allusion to the shorter upper and lower lateral lines, which do not extend as far as the caudal fin.

== Description ==
The fourline snakeblenny has an elongate and compressed body. with the body depth being one sixth to one fifth of its standard length. and a large head. It has a slightly oblique, large mouth which extends back to a level below the centre of the eye. There are small conical teeth on the jaws, vomer and palatine. The eyes are large and has a diameter which is roughly equal to the length of the snout and there is a narrow space between the eyes. There are 2 sensory pores in this species to the front of the eyes and 3 behind it. Other sensory pores are found on the head, some arranged in rows. There are two lateral lines, each with two branches. The dorsal fin is long, confluent with the caudal fin, and contains 47 to 49 spines while the anal fin has 2 spines at its origin with between 29 and 32 soft rays and ends with 2 more spines. The upper body is greyish-brown with the lower body being yellowish, there is a series of indistinct sometimes broken darker bands on the sides. The head is dark with a darker pale edges diagonal band through the eye. There are white spots on the jaw and gill cover. The dorsal fin is greyish brown with vague dark spots and an eyespot between the 6th and 10th spines. The other fins are dark with white margins. The maximum published total length is 22 cm (8.7 in).

== Distribution, habitat and biology ==
The fourline snakeblenny is found in the northern Western Atlantic Ocean where it is found off Greenland and in eastern North America from Hudson Bay to Labrador and in the Northern Pacific along the northern Arctic coast of Alaska, in the Sea of Okhotsk and the Bering Sea. It is a benthic fish which is found over sand to gravel-and-stone seabeds between 16 and 400 m (52 and 1,312 ft) depth, but it is normally found in water of less than 70 m (230 ft). It feeds on crustaceans.
