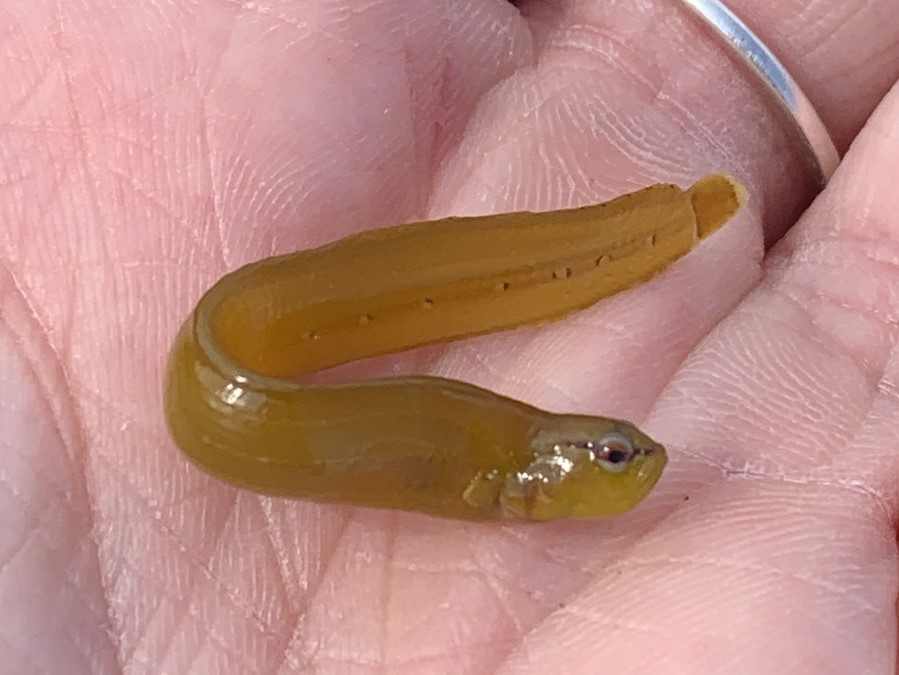

Scientific classification
- Kingdom: Animalia
- Phylum: Chordata
- Class: Actinopterygii
- Order: Perciformes
- Family: Stichaeidae
- Subfamily: Xiphisterinae
- Genus: Phytichthys; Hubbs, 1923
- Species: P. chirus

Binomial name
- Phytichthys chirus (Jordan & Gilbert, 1880)

Synonyms
- Xiphister chirus Jordan & Gilbert, 1880; Xiphistes chirus (Jordan & Gilbert, 1880); Xiphistes ulvae Jordan & Starks, 1895; Xiphistes versicolor Gilbert & Burke, 1912

= Ribbon prickleback =

Species of fish

The ribbon prickleback (Phytichthys chirus) is a species of marine ray-finned fish belonging to the family Stichaeidae, the pricklebacks and shannies. It is the only species in the monospecific genus Phytichthys, and is found in the northern Pacific Ocean.
