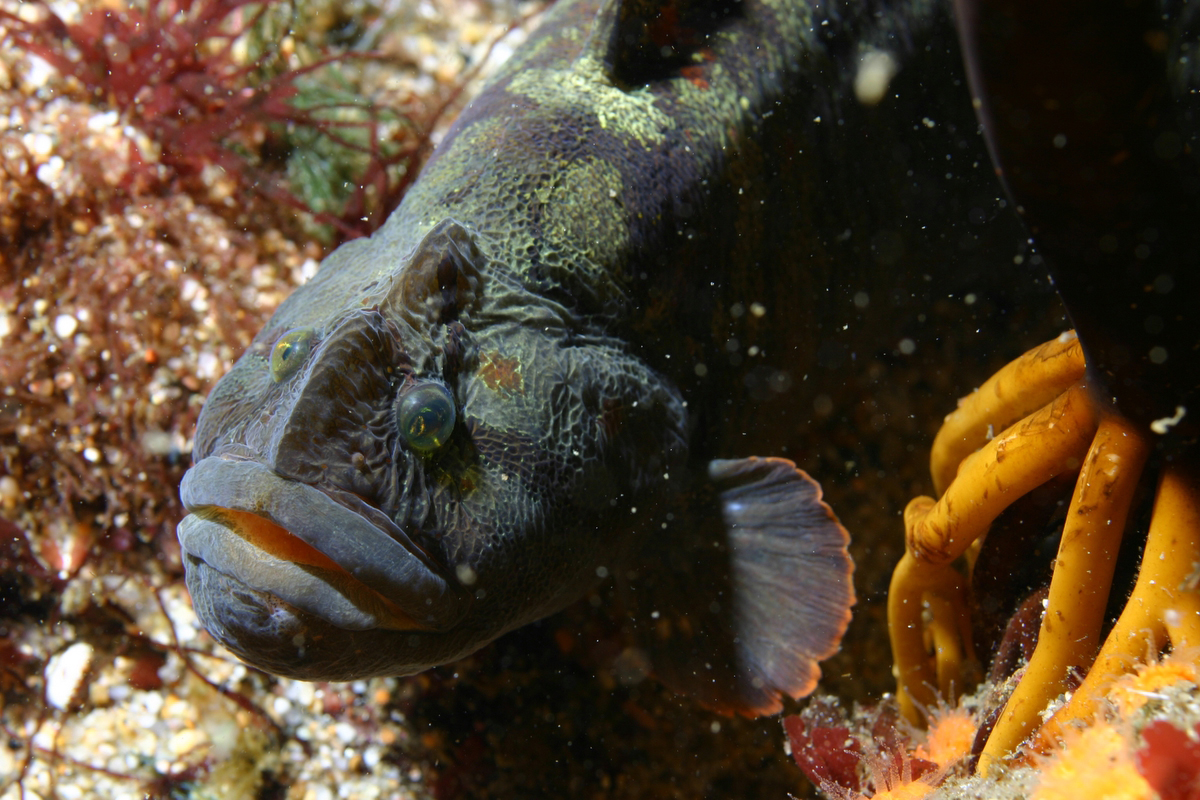
- At the Monterey Bay Aquarium

Scientific classification
- Kingdom: Animalia
- Phylum: Chordata
- Class: Actinopterygii
- Order: Perciformes
- Suborder: Zoarcoidei
- Family: Cebidichthyidae
- Genus: Cebidichthys; Ayres, 1855
- Species: C. violaceus

Binomial name
- Cebidichthys violaceus (Girard, 1854)

Synonyms
- (Species): Cebidichthys cristagalli Ayres, 1855

= Monkeyface prickleback =

Species of fish

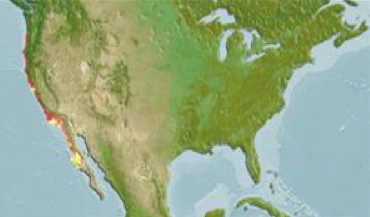
Geographical range of Cebidichthys violaceus.

The monkeyface prickleback (Cebidichthys violaceus), also commonly known as the monkeyface eel, is a species of prickleback native to the Pacific coast of North America. Although its shape resembles an eel due to its slender and leg-less body, the monkeyface prickleback does not belong to the order Anguilliformes, which includes true eels, instead, it is classified under either the Perciformes, along with nearly half of all bony fish, or the Scorpaeniformes, according to different authorities. Observations in nature and in the laboratory indicate that C. violaceus is a cryptic, bottom dweller and a weak, short-distance swimmer.

== Description ==
The species reaches a maximum size of 76 cm (30 in) and may live up to 18–19 years. The heaviest monkeyface prickleback recorded to date was just over 6 lb (2.7 kg). They are slow-growing and reach sexual maturity between four and seven years of age, at a body length of approximately 36 to 45 cm. Some distinguishing characteristics of the C. violaceus include its color, which varies from black to a brownish-green. It also has two uniform dark stripes below its eyes and one or more reddish rust-colored spots on its side or belly. The coloration of both sexes is similar. This species has an anguilliform body shape, with large pectoral fins and two spines on the anal fin. Additionally, breeding males often have a large fleshy lump on the top of their heads.

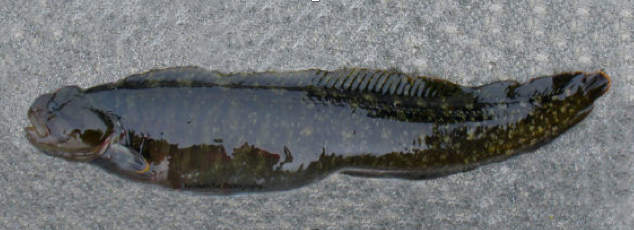
28 cm (11 in) Monkeyface Prickleback caught in Half Moon Bay, California. Catch, photograph, and identification courtesy of Kenneth Tse, Toronto, Ontario, Canada.

== Distribution ==
The monkeyface prickleback has a distribution range from southern Oregon to the northern reaches of the Mexican state of Baja California, this species is a coastal fish that inhabits rocky, intertidal areas close to shore. They are most abundant along the coast of central California. Their vertical distribution ranges from the upper intertidal zone to a depth of 24 meters. However, smaller individuals are commonly found closer to the higher intertidal zones due to reduced predation and competition, where they utilize rocks for protection during low tide. C. violaceus moves from the high intertidal to the shallow subtidal as it grows. It is considered to be a residential species, as it moves short distances from crevices or under rocks to foraging sites. This means it tends to stay in one area and does not move far from its hiding spots. This species appears to occupy a small home range of several meters and is mostly active during periods of a higher tide when it forages.

== Biology ==
In California, pricklebacks (Family Stichaeidae) are oviparous and lay their eggs on subtidal, rocky surfaces. It is unclear whether the males, females, or both guard the brood until hatching. Fertilization is internal, and spawning activity occurs from January to May, with the peak spawning period from February to April. Fecundity ranges from 17,500 eggs for a 16-inch, seven-year old fish to 46,000 eggs for a 24-inch, 11-year old fish, with smaller individuals producing fewer eggs. First described by French biologist Charles Frédéric Girard in 1854, these fish spawn on the seafloor and exhibit some nest-guarding behavior. This species is capable of living out of water under algae for extended periods and has air-breathing capacity.

== Diet ==
While young monkeyface prickleback feed on zooplankton and crustaceans, adults are primarily herbivorous, consuming red and green algae. As early juveniles, their prey includes copepods, amphipods, isopods, mysids, and polychaetas. Adults have few predators other than humans, but young fish are vulnerable to piscivorous birds and other fish, such as grass rockfish. Predation primarily affects the earlier life stages of this species; large juveniles and adult fish are most likely to evade or outgrow these predators.

== Conservation status ==
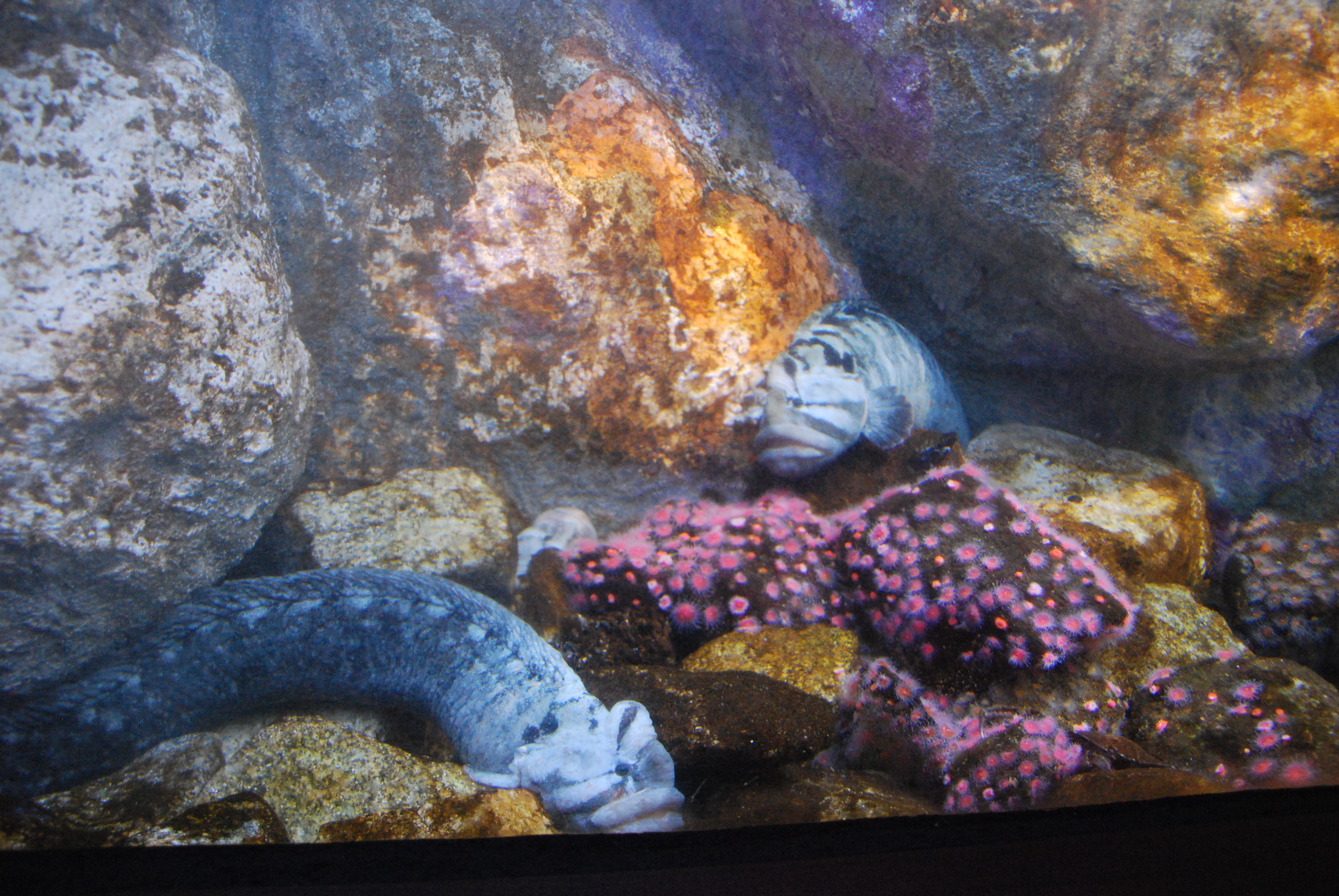
Two monkeyface pricklebacks at the California Academy of Sciences

There is little evidence on the conservation status of this species, however they do have a few threats. Other intertidal boulder and crevice-dwelling eel-like fish, such as the rock and black pricklebacks and penpoint and rockweed gunnels, may compete with monkeyface prickleback for space and food resources. The main threat to these species is recreational fishing, which utilizes an either a bamboo or fiberglass pole with a short lead and hook to present bait into the caves and crevices that the species inhabits. ^{[4]} This practice is known as "poke poling." In the modern era, the fish's appeal is and has always been mostly among amateur anglers or foragers. The species also supports a small commercial fishery, and it is common to find Monkeyface Prickleback as a menu item in Northern California and Oregon restaurants. Monkeyface prickleback have long been sought after for their edible white flesh, with remains found in the middens of Native American peoples along the California coast. More recently, given its herbivorous diet, C. violaceus has been identified as a possible candidate for aquaculture in order to meet sustainability demands. While its current threat status is unknown, its slow growth and long generation time may pose conservation concerns.

== Ecology ==
The Monkeyface Prickleback inhabits the intertidal zone, the most active and nutrient-rich part of the water column. The habitat is constantly shifting and changing with the tides, swell, and season. When the tides roll in, they carry food and oxygenated water. When the tides recede, the water leaves stagnant, tidal pools that have very limited resources. Monkeyface Prickleback has adapted to survive in holes with little to no water with special modified gills that work both ways; breathing inside of water and outside of water. As long as the Monkeyface Prickleback stays in a moistened area, it can survive breathing outside of water for around 35 hours. These fish also secrete an extremely slick mucus through their tough, scaleless skin. The Mucus not only protects them from predators, though from sharp rocks, and drying out. Their slender bodies also make maneuvering or even slithering to water puddles easier compared to their neighbors, the Brown rockfish (Sebastes auriculatus). The Monkeyface Prickleback is perfectly adapted to survive the treacherous intertidal zone through specialized adaptations like modified gills, mucus, through skin, and a slender body.
