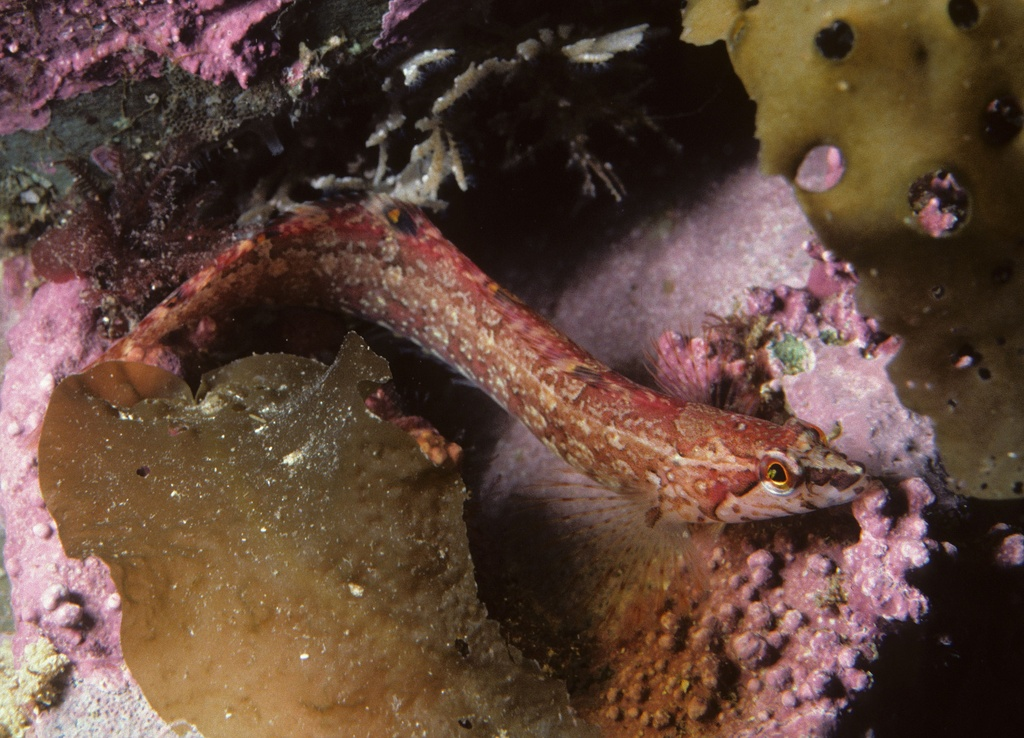
- Arctic shanny (Sticheus punctatus) in Newfoundland

Scientific classification
- Kingdom: Animalia
- Phylum: Chordata
- Class: Actinopterygii
- Division: Teleostei
- Order: Perciformes
- Suborder: Zoarcoidei
- Family: Stichaeidae; Gill, 1864

Subfamilies
- see text

= Stichaeidae =

Stichaeidae Temporal range: Miocene to present

Family of fishes

Stichaeidae, the pricklebacks or shannies, are a family of marine ray-finned fishes in the suborder Zoarcoidei of the order Scorpaeniformes. Most species are found in the North Pacific Ocean with a few in the North Atlantic Ocean.

== Taxonomy ==
Stichaeidae was first proposed as a family in 1864 by the American zoologist Theodore Gill, although he called it the Stichaeoidae. The 5th edition of Fishes of the World classifies this family within the suborder Zoarcoidei, within the order Scorpaeniformes. Other authorities classify this family in the infraorder Zoarcales within the suborder Cottoidei of the Perciformes because removing the Scorpaeniformes from the Perciformes renders that taxon non monophyletic. Presently, Eschmeyer's Catalog of Fishes has synonymized the Scorpaeniformes with the Perciformes and kept the Stichaeidae as a family of the Zoarcoidei within it.

Fishes of the World mentions six subfamilies but does not assign genera to the subfamilies. More recently, authorities such as Eschmeyer's Catalog of Fishes split the Cebidichthyidae, Opisthocentridae, Lumpenidae and Neozoarcidae from the Stichaeidae as valid families, based on phylogenetic studies which found the previous taxonomy to be paraphyletic. The genera which are classified within the family Eulophiidae were also previously included within the Stichaeidae.

=== Subfamilies and genera ===
Eschmeyer's Catalog of Fishes classifies Stichaeidae into 4 subfamilies and 17 genera as follows († means extinct):

- Subfamily Stichaeinae Gill, 1864
  - Genus Dinogunellus Herzenstein, 1890
  - Genus Ernogrammus Jordan & Evermann, 1898
  - Genus Eumesogrammus Gill, 1864
  - Genus Plagiogrammus T.H. Bean, 1894
  - Genus Stichaeopsis Kner, 1870
  - Genus Stichaeus Reinhardt, 1836
  - Genus Ulvaria Jordan & Evermann, 1896
- Subfamily Chirolophinae Jordan & Evermann 1898
  - Genus Bryozoichthys Whitley, 1931
  - Genus Chirolophis Swainson, 1839
  - Genus Gymnoclinus Gilbert & Burke, 1912
  - Genus Soldatovia Taranetz, 1937
- Subfamily Alectriinae Makushok, 1958
  - Genus Alectrias Jordan & Evermann, 1898
  - Genus Pseudalectrias Lindberg, 1938
- Subfamily Xiphisterinae Jordan & Gilbert, 1883
  - Genus Alectridium Gilbert & Burke, 1912
  - Genus Anoplarchus Gill, 1861
  - Genus †Nvichia Nazarkin, 1998
  - Genus Phytichthys Hubbs, 1923
  - Genus Xiphister Jordan, 1880

=== Etymology ===
The name of the family comes from that of its type genus Stichaeus, which means "set in a row", which may be an allusion to the row of black spots on the dorsal fins of the species in that genus.

== Characteristics ==
Stichaeidae are characterised by having elongate bodies which are a little compressed. They have a very long dorsal fin which typically contains a large number of sharp spines, giving rise to the common name of prickleback, and there may be some spines at the rear of the dorsal fin. The anal fin is long and has its origin closer to the head than to the tail, or halfway between the head and tail. The pectoral fins may be very small to very large and fan shaped, containing between 2 and 21 rays. The normally present small pelvic fins are located anterior to the pectoral fins, and have a single spine and between one and four rays. There are no appendages on the head, although some species have a crest, and there is a single pair of nostrils. The body is typically covered with small, overlapping scales but the head, other than the cheeks, is normally lacking scales. The sensory canals on the head are typically well developed; there are normally 6 preopercular pores and 4 mandibular pores. There may be two lateral lines which can vary from a hardly noticeable row of neuromasts to one or more canals which can have complex branching. Their teeth are small and may be incisor-like or conical in shape. In the majority of species the gill membranes are widely joined and separate from the isthmus. Most species have a siphon on the operculum. They usually have pyloric caeca but not a swim bladder. They have ribs.

== Distribution and habitat ==
Stichaeidae are found in the North Pacific, North Atlantic, and Arctic oceans, with the majority of species in the North Pacific. They are coastal fishes which are found beneath rocks and in algae from the intertidal zone to shallow bays. the can be found at depths greater than 250 m (820 ft) on the outer continental shelf.
