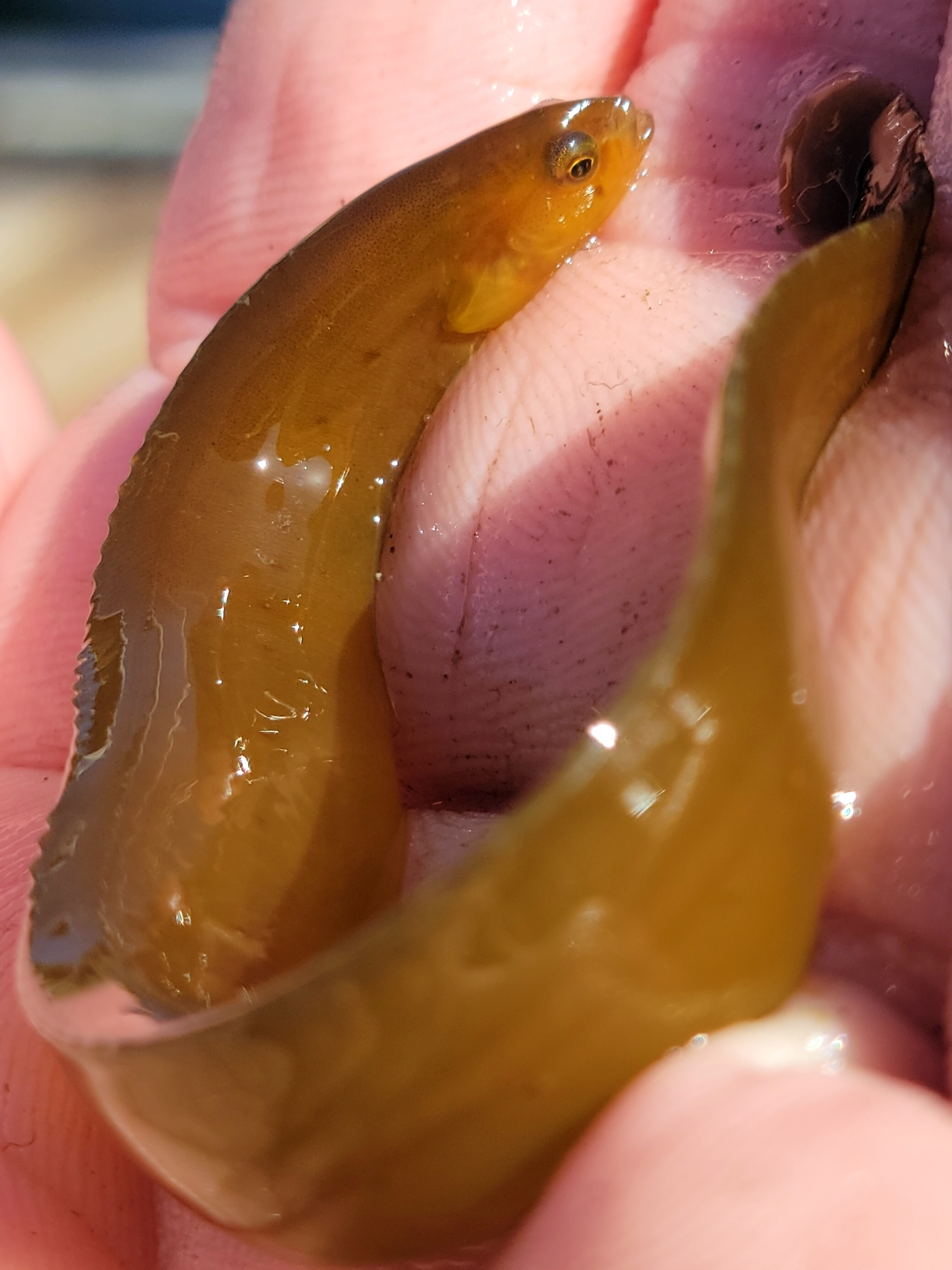

Scientific classification
- Kingdom: Animalia
- Phylum: Chordata
- Class: Actinopterygii
- Order: Perciformes
- Family: Pholidae
- Subfamily: Apodichthyinae
- Genus: Ulvicola; Gilbert & Starks, 1897
- Species: U. sanctaerosae

Binomial name
- Ulvicola sanctaerosae Gilbert & Starks, 1897

Synonyms
- Apodichthys sanctaerosae (Gilbert & Starks 1897)

= Kelp gunnel =

Species of fish

The kelp gunnel (Ulvicola sanctaerosae) is a species of marine ray-finned fish belonging to the family Pholidae, the gunnels. It is the only species in the monospecific genus Ulvicola. It is found in the eastern North Pacific Ocean.

== Taxonomy ==
The kelp gunnel was first formally described in 1897 by the American ichthyologists Charles Henry Gilbert & Edwin Chapin Starks with its type locality given as Santa Rosa Island in California. Gilbert and Starks placed their new species in the new monospecific genus Ulvicola. The 5th edition of Fishes of the World classifies this taxon within the subfamily Apodichthyinae, one of two subfamilies in the family Pholidae with the other being the monogeneric Pholinae. However, some authorities, place this species within the genus Apodichthys.

== Etymology ==
The kelp gunnel's generic name, Ulvicola, means an inhabitant of Ulva, the genus of sea lettuce, possible a reference to its rockpool habitat and its specific name refers to the type locality.

== Description ==
The kelp gunnel has a maximum total length of 29 cm (11 in).

== Distribution, habitat and biology ==
The kelp gunnel is found in the eastern Pacific Ocean along the western coast of North America between Pacific Grove, California to northern Baja California in Mexico, as well as Guadalupe Island. This is a demersal species that typically species sits on the fronds of kelp, normally high up in the canopy of the kelp forest in waters with a depth of around 12 m (39 ft). These fishes feed on small crustaceans. They use their tails to attach themselves to the stipes of kelp, wrapping it around them.
