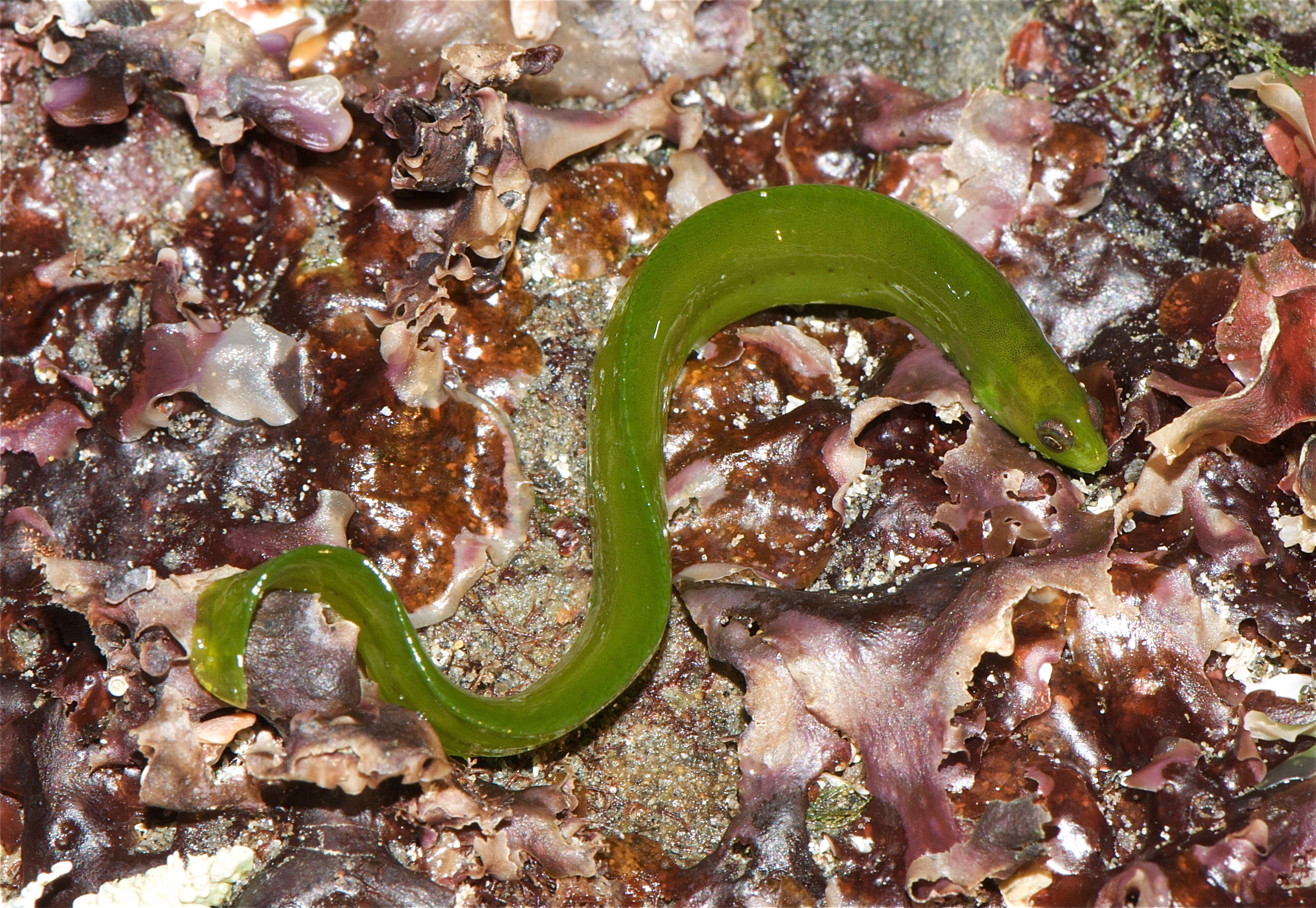

Scientific classification
- Kingdom: Animalia
- Phylum: Chordata
- Class: Actinopterygii
- Order: Perciformes
- Family: Pholidae
- Genus: Apodichthys
- Species: A. fucorum

Binomial name
- Apodichthys fucorum Jordan & Gilbert, 1880

Synonyms
- Xererpes fucorum (Jordan & Gilbert, 1880)

= Rockweed gunnel =

Species of fish

The rockweed gunnel (Apodichthys fucorum), also known as the Fucus blenny, is a species of marine ray-finned fish belonging to the family Pholidae, the gunnels. This species is found in the eastern North Pacific Ocean. They may often get mistaken with the Rock Gunnel, otherwise known as the Butterfish. The mix-up is further exacerbated with the German name of the Rockweed Gunnel which is Butterfisch.

== Taxonomy ==
The rockweed gunnel was first formally described in 1880 by the American ichthyologists David Starr Jordan and Charles Henry Gilbert with its type locality given as Point Pinos, near Monterey, California. The specific name fucorum means "belonging to Fucus, the brown algae which forms a frequent habitat for this species.

== Description ==
The rockweed gunnel has a translucent body which varies in color from bright green to a reddish-brown and its color is determined by their environment. Fish living among green seaweed are green and fish living among brown seaweed are reddish brown. They can change colors depending on the type of seaweed surrounds them. The Rockweed Gunnels' colors are also determined by the color of the amphipods that it consumes.

It has a long, anguilliform body (thin and eel-like) with small fins, each roughly equal in size to the diameter of their eye and too small to be used in swimming. The spine in the anal fin has a length which is 40% of the length of the head and has a sharp point, tilted forward. This fish has 83 or 84 spines in its dorsal fin and a single spine and between 32 and 38 soft rays in its anal fin. It has a rounded caudal fin. They have relatively big eyes as well as terminal mouths that are somewhat smaller than other gunnel species. Its maximum published total length is 23 cm (9.1 in).

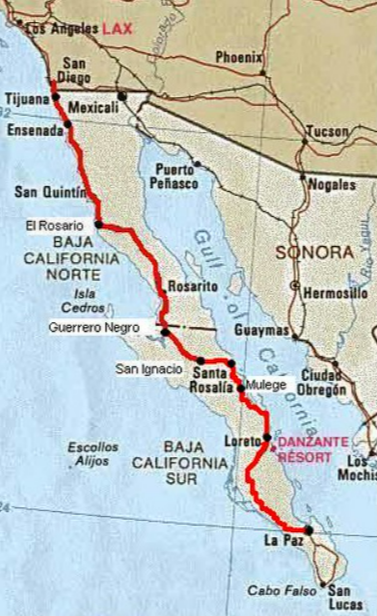
Map of the Baja Coast where Rockweed Gunnel may be found. Curtesy of monkey sidekick on Flickr

== Distribution and habitat ==
The rockweed gunnel is found along the eastern Pacific Ocean from Banks Island, British Columbia in the north, to Punta Escarpada, central Baja California, Mexico in the south. The exact status of the species pertaining to each area is unknown as there has been no recent primary literature on this topic. This species lives in the demersal and intertidal zones at depths of up to 9 m (30 ft) which they use to migrate on. It commonly occurs in tide pools and inshore areas among masses of brown seaweed in the genus fucus, also known as 'rockweed'.

== Biology ==
The rockweed gunnel’s diet is mostly carnivorous and consists of mollusks and small species of crustaceans. They also consume algae when it is encountered, but primarily eat invertebrates and crustaceans when possible. Rockweed gunnels are able to survive when exposed at low tide because they can breathe air, being able to survive for up to 20 hours outside of water, so long as there is sufficient moisture. They use their slime coat to prevent drying out.

They are preyed upon by many animals including other larger fish such as Staghorn Sculpins. Many marine birds and mammals are also predatory towards the Rockweed Gunnel. They will hide under rocks and in seaweed to hide from predators.

Rockweed Gunnels are oviparous, laying eggs during winter time. There are no current literature on the specific months they are laid, but taking into consideration other similar gunnel species, it is inferred to be around November to January. The mothers will sometimes be with them, coiling them to protect the eggs. However, more often than not, the eggs are then usually left on their own. The number of eggs that are typically laid as well as the hatch period are not described in recent literature. Rockweed Gunnels are seen in groups during the summer, usually looking for food together.

The average lifespan of a Rockweed Gunnel is unknown, as recent literature about this aspect is also absent.

== Conservation status ==
Because the Rockweed Gunnel are not a priority for scientists and marine biologists alike, the Rockweed Gunnel currently has no official conservation status. There are no official records for habitat impacts, human activities, or fisheries on the Rockweed Gunnel either. There are also no recorded documents of Rockweed Gunnels kept in captivity successfully.
