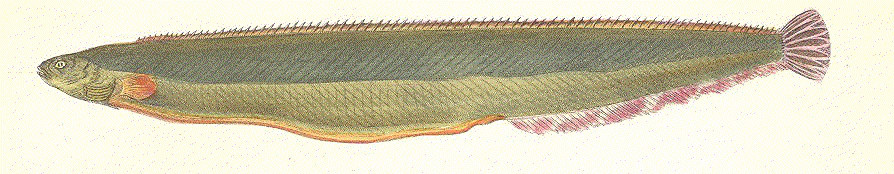

Scientific classification
- Kingdom: Animalia
- Phylum: Chordata
- Class: Actinopterygii
- Order: Perciformes
- Family: Pholidae
- Subfamily: Apodichthyinae
- Genus: Rhodymenichthys; Jordan & Evermann, 1896
- Species: R. dolichogaster

Binomial name
- Rhodymenichthys dolichogaster (Pallas, 1814)

Synonyms
- Blennius dolichogaster Pallas, 1814; Pholis dolichogaster (Pallas, 1814); Centronotus taczanowskii Steindachner, 1881; Gunnellus ruberrimus Valenciennes, 1836

= Stippled gunnel =

Species of fish

The stippled gunnel (Rhodymenichthys dolichogaster) is a species of marine ray-finned fish belonging to the family Pholidae, the gunnels. It is the only species in the monospecific genus Rhodymenichthys. It is found in the northern North Pacific Ocean.

== Taxonomy ==
The stippled gunnel was first formally described as Blennius dolichogaster in 1814 by the German zoologist and botanist Peter Simon Pallas with its type locality given as Kamchatka. In 1836 Achille Valenciennes described a new species Gunnellus ruberrimus from the Kuril Islands and in 1896 David Starr Jordan and Barton Warren Evermann designated G. ruberrimus as the type species of the new genus Rhodymenichthys. G. ruberrimus was later considered to be a junior synonym of Pallas's B. dolichogaster. The 5th edition of Fishes of the World classifies this taxon within the subfamily Apodichthyinae, one of two subfamilies in the family Pholidae with the other being the monogeneric Pholinae. Other authorities place this taxon outside of the Apodichthyinae and resolve Rhodymenichthys as a sister taxon to the genus Pholis, so placing it within the Pholinae.

== Etymology ==
The stipple gunnel's generic name Rhodymenichthys is a combination of Rhodymenia, a genus of red seaweed, assumed to be a reference to the cherry-red colour of the body and fins as well as the occurrence of this species in beds of that seaweed, with ichthys the Greek for "fish". The specific name dolichogaster means "long belly", assumed to refer to the anal fin's origin being quite far to the rear, creating a long belly.

== Description ==
The stippled gunnel has an elongated body. Its dorsal fin contains between 80 and 96 spines while the anal fin has 2 or 3 spines and between 40 and 51 soft rays. There is a single pore between the eyes and it has pelvic fins. It has a highly variable body colour which may be brown, green or pale purple and there is a thin silvery horizontal band which runs from the eye to the base of the pectoral fin. This species reached a maximum published total length of 25 cm (9.8 in).

== Distribution and habitat ==
The stippled gunnel is found in the North Pacific Ocean from Niigata and Iwate Prefectures in Japan to Primorskii Krai, Sakhalin and the Commander Islands in Russia. It has been found from the Bering Sea to the Aleutian Islands and has been reported from South Korea, This species occurs down to 148 m (486 ft) and is commonly found among seaweeds in the intertidal zone.
