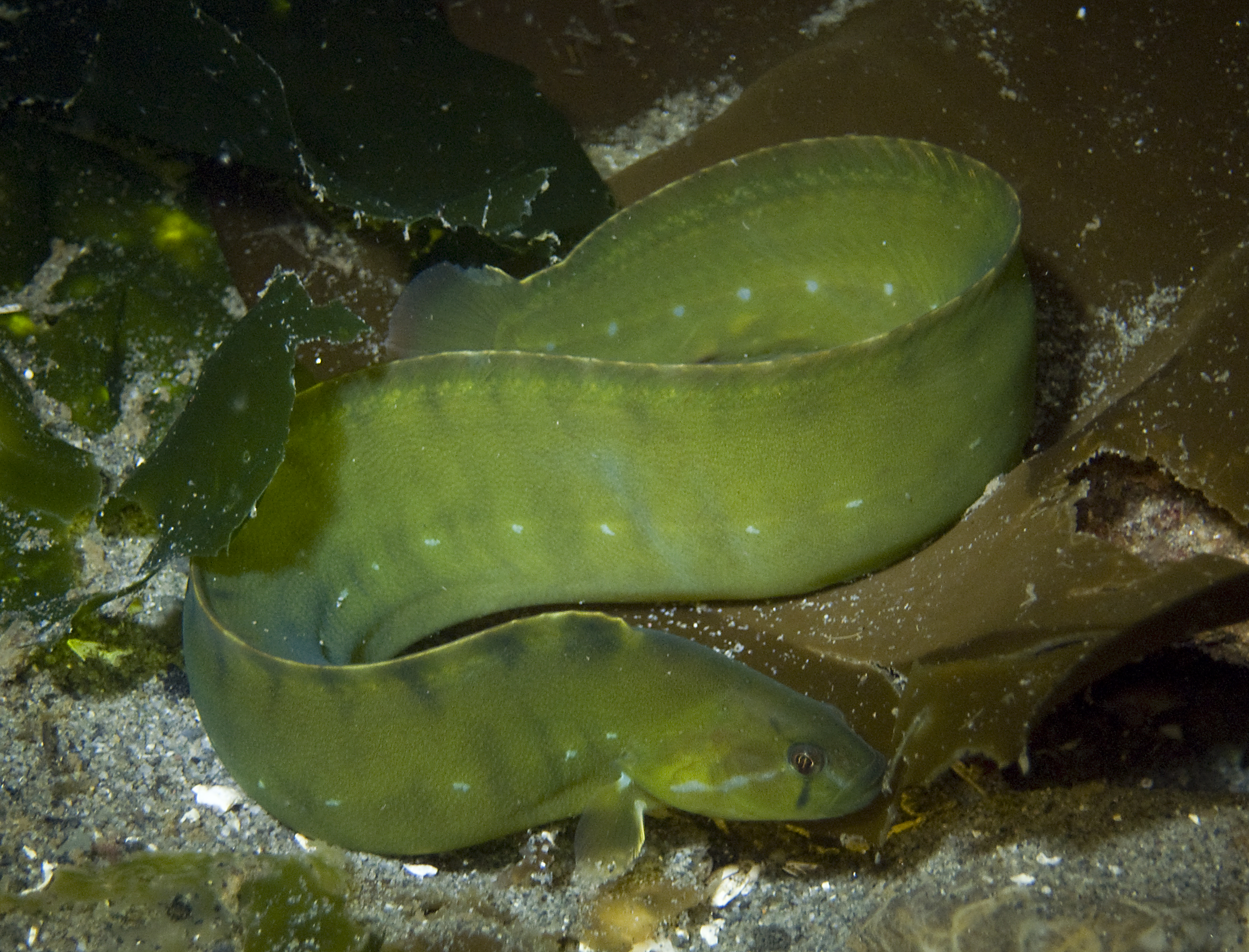
- Penpoint gunnel (Apodichthys flavidus)

Scientific classification
- Kingdom: Animalia
- Phylum: Chordata
- Class: Actinopterygii
- Order: Perciformes
- Family: Pholidae
- Subfamily: Apodichthyinae; Hubbs, 1927

Genera
- See text

= Apodichthyinae =

Subfamily of fish

Apodichthyinae is a subfamily of marine ray-finned fish belonging to the family Pholidae, the gunnels. These fishes are found in the North Pacific Ocean.

== Genera ==
The subfamily contains 3 genera with a total of 4 species:

- Apodichthys Girard, 1854
- Rhodymenichthys Jordan & Evermann, 1896
- Ulvicola Gilbert & Starks, 1897
