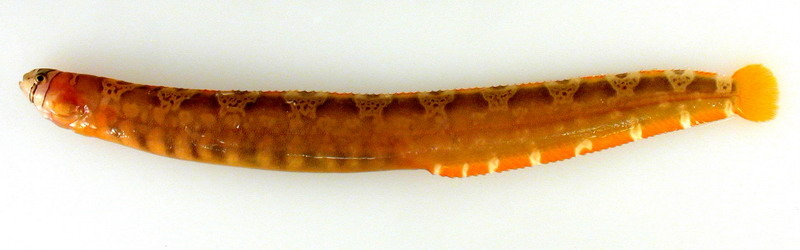

Scientific classification
- Kingdom: Animalia
- Phylum: Chordata
- Class: Actinopterygii
- Order: Perciformes
- Family: Pholidae
- Genus: Pholis
- Species: P. fasciata

Binomial name
- Pholis fasciata (Bloch & Schneider, 1801)

Synonyms
- Centronotus fasciatus Bloch & Schneider, 1801; Pholis fasciatus (Bloch & Schneider, 1801); Blennius taenia Pallas, 1814; Gunnellus groenlandicus Reinhardt, 1830; Gunnellus muraenoides Valenciennes, 1839; Centronotus gunelliformis Günther, 1861; Muraenoides maxillaris Bean, 1881; Pholis gilli Evermann & Goldsborough, 1907; Allopholis piskunovi Borets, 1988

= Pholis fasciata =

Banded gunnel

Species of fish

Pholis fasciata, the banded gunnel, is a species of marine ray-finned fish belonging to the family Pholidae, the gunnels. It is found in the North Pacific, Arctic and western North Atlantic Oceans. Very little is known about its life cycle or reproduction.

== Physical characteristics ==
The banded gunnel reaches about 12 inches (30 cm) long and has an elongated body, somewhat like an eel. Its dorsal fin has small spikes and its skin is covered in tiny scales. Its color ranges from bright reddish-orange to greenish-yellow. It has thin, dark red bands reaching across its belly and white blotches with black spots on its back and dorsal fin. An olive-green and black stripe extends down from the top of the head down through the eyes and down the cheeks. The pectoral fins are small (less than half the length of the head) and are fan-shaped. The pelvic fins are either tiny or absent.

== Distribution and habitat ==
The banded gunnel lives in arctic and subarctic waters in the Arctic Ocean, near Southern Labrador and Western Greenland, and in the North Pacific Ocean. It lives in the benthic zone, in the sand, broken shells, and gravel. The temperature of the water usually ranges from 5–10 °C (41–50 °F).

== Behavior ==
=== Diet ===
The banded gunnel feeds on small crustaceans such as crabs, lobsters, and shrimp.

=== Predators ===
The banded gunnel is fed upon by sculpins, cods, and occasionally sea birds.
