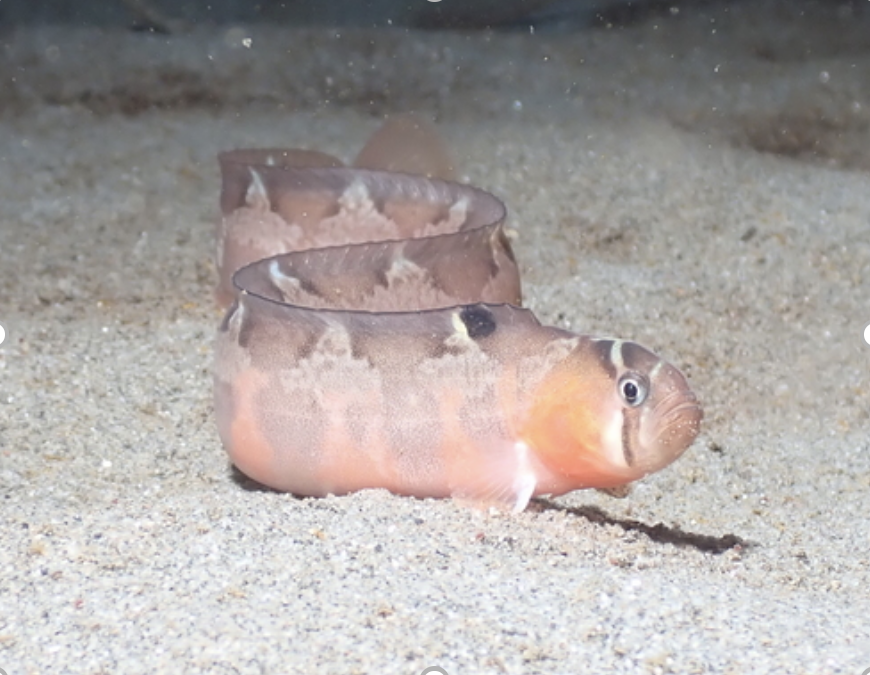

Conservation status
- Least Concern (IUCN 3.1)

Scientific classification
- Kingdom: Animalia
- Phylum: Chordata
- Class: Actinopterygii
- Division: Teleostei
- Order: Perciformes
- Family: Pholidae
- Genus: Pholis
- Species: P. ornata

Binomial name
- Pholis ornata (Girard, 1854)

Synonyms
- Gunellus ornatus Girard, 1854; Pholis ornatus (Girard, 1854); Pholidichthys anguilliformis Lockington, 1881

= Saddleback gunnel =

Species of fish

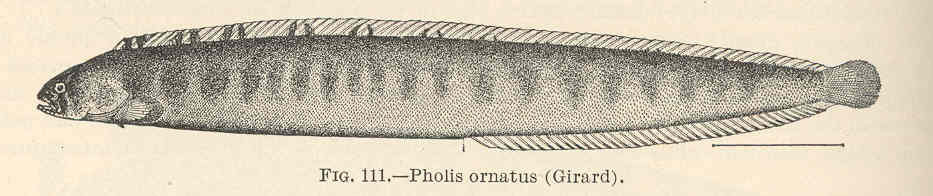
FMIB 39435 Pholis ornatus (Girard)

The saddleback gunnel (Pholis ornata), also known as the saddled blenny, is a species of marine ray-finned fish belonging to the family Pholidae, the gunnels. This fish occurs in the shallow coastal waters of the eastern North Pacific Ocean.

== Taxonomy ==
The saddleback gunnel was first formally described as Gunnellus ornatus in 1854 by the French biologist Charles Frédéric Girard with the type locality given as Presidio, San Francisco, California. The specific name ornata means "decorated" or "adorned", assumed to be an allusion to the 12–13 blackish-brown saddle markings on back, as well as the light and dark streaks which radiate outwards from the eyes.

== Description ==
The saddleback gunnel has between 74 and 79 spines in its dorsal fin and 2 spines and 35 to 38 soft rays in its anal fin. The caudal fin is rounded and it has tiny pelvic fin. The maximum published total length is 30 cm (12 in). There are 12 or 13 blackish-brown saddle markings along the back and light and dark streaks which radiate outwards from the eyes.

The head's lateral system functions using a series of pores, including "two nasal, six suborbital, six postorbital, three occipital, four mandibular, and five preopercular." The dorsal fin is significantly long, on average reaching 86.2% of the fish's body length. The dorsal fin has short, thick spines and is significantly long, on average reaching 86.2% of the fish's body length. Preceding the thick short spines, the first four to six spines on the dorsal fin are thinner. At the beginning of the anal fin, two thick spines are present. Through webbing, the caudal fin is connected to both the dorsal and anal fins. The head is not covered in scales and scales are not present past postorbital canal and occipital commisura. The scales are set in an even order on the body. The body is red-brown speckled with gray colors. The dorsal fin has 11–16 thin white stripes in a vertical fashion. The anal fin is dotted with up to 14 light spots.

Teeth on the bottom jaw often are greater in number than the upper jaw. The teeth on the bottom jaw also develop a second row of teeth, numbering to over 50 total teeth in large individuals. The number of teeth varies based on geographic location. Its body is elongated, and its snout is roughly 1/5 as long as its head. Teeth also possess an elongated appearance. Its teeth are mid-sized and are tapered. Saddleback gunnel possess 24–26 teeth on its upper jaw and 18–20 teeth on the lower jaw. Laterally, the saddleback gunnel's body is compressed.

== Biology ==
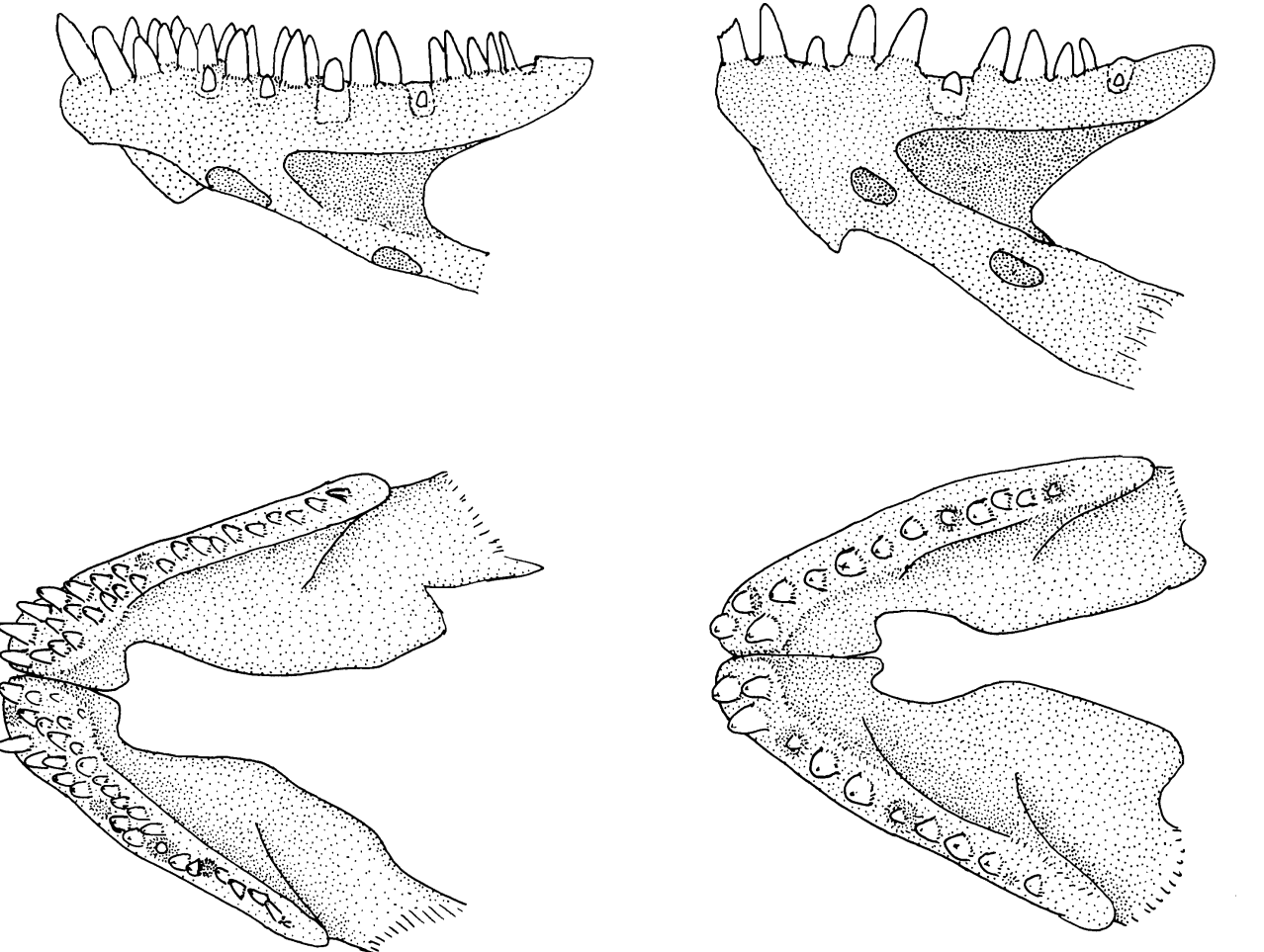
Sketch of P. ornata jaw from dorsal, lateral, and side angles. (Peden and Hughes)

Saddleback gunnels feed on small crustaceans and mollusks. After spawning both the males and females guard the egg mass. In the early post-larval stage during early spring, the fish are 18–20 mm.

P. ornata displays a capacity to withstand peak temperatures at 31 to 31.5 Celsius. Its thermal capacity aids in its ability to adapt to the changing environments and seasonal plants every summer. With its thermal capacity, the fish can live in uninsulated areas such as plant beds. To describe the fish's olfactory system, P. ornata's rosettes have 2 lamellae. In shape, the lamellae are bulbous with an indent midway. The size of the lamellae and rosette differs for each individual. Possibly, the lamellae size correlates with the individual's body size.

== Phylogeny and genetics ==
The saddleback gunnel belongs to the genus Pholis and subfamily Pholidae. Pholidae represents two subfamilies Pholinae and Apodichhyinae. Despite sharing the same subfamily, the genus Apodychthys differs greatly from the family Pholinae. The saddleback gunnel shares genetic similarities with other species in its family group (Pholidae). Pholidae species possess 2043 nucleotide pairs in total. This includes "sequenced COI, cytochrome b, and 16S rRNA genes of mt DNA". In the mtDNA sequences, 503 nucleotide substitutions are present. Substitution mutations are also present in the COI and cytochrome b genes. The genetic difference level of the genus Pholis from other genera of the family measures at 12.9%. The Genera Phlis and Rhodymenichthys share genetic similarities more than other genera in the specie's phylogeny. From the genus Apodichthys, Phlis has an average of 11.4% in mtDNA divergence level.

== Diet ==
Saddleback gunnel consume small harpacticoid copepods, which are small crustaceans that live underwater. Saddleback gunnel do not consume harpacticoid copepods that have grown too large for its mouth. Additionally, P. ornata's diet consists of mid-sized Macoma siphons and tanids and large gammarid amphipods. Prey size tends to correlate with the size of the saddleback gunnel. The larger the saddleback gunnel's body is, the larger the prey tends to be. It is observed that saddleback gunnel's stomachs are fuller in the midmorning, rather than at night, suggesting the fish tend to consume prey in the morning. Young saddleback gunnel tends to live in eelgrass, where harpacticoid is widely available for consumption. It is also important to note diets of P. ornata likely vary with each habitat and different resource availability. Between the rocky substrate, eelgrass beds, and seasonal coverage in Yaquina Bay, P. ornata shows a preference for eelgrass and vegetative coverage.

== Conservation status ==
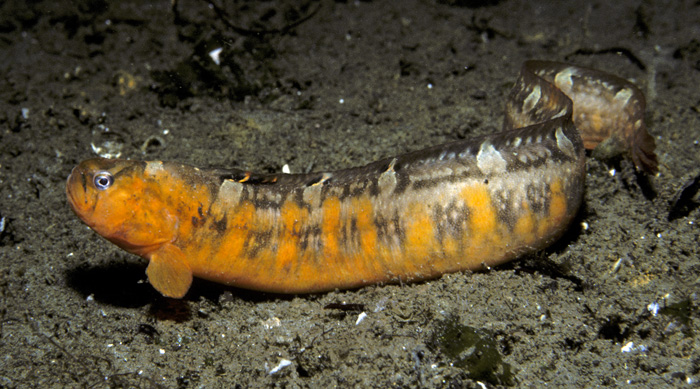
Adult saddleback gunnel resting on muddy bottom layer. Underwater Photographer Jett Britnell's Gallery: Jett Britnell: Saddleback gunnel – DivePhotoGuide.com

Pholis ornata is classified as Least Concern. P. ornata's populations are possibly impacted by pollution along the coast, but more research must be done to better understand the effects of climate change and pollution on this species. No documented or known conservation efforts for this species is recorded.

Eelgrass beds and other vegetative coastal habitats are the most vulnerable by human activities among all marine ecosystems. Major declines and rising mortality rates of eelgrass beds have been documented around the world. This is due to many harmful factors like aquaculture, climate change, disease, harmful fishing tactics like dredging, and nutrient dumping in waters. Since Pholis ornata relies so greatly on eelgrass beds and other vegetative covers for habitat use, the decline of eelgrass beds may be a threat to their population.

== Distribution and habitat ==
The saddleback gunnel ranges from Vancouver Island in the north to Santa Barbara County, California in the south. It is found at depths of 0 to 50 m (0 to 164 ft) along the coast and in estuaries where it is found on muddy substrates among seaweeds and seagrass. They are rarely seen by divers because they spend most of the day in structures and are flighty, even at night.

Additionally, Pholis ornata are intertidal and subtidal. P. ornata also resides in Hardy Bay and Brooks Peninsula by Vancouver Island. Throughout summers, P. ornata can be found in the Straits of Georgia and Juan de Fuca. In these areas, P. ornata was recorded inhabiting eelgrass on beaches. Moving to the South, P. ornata's habitats range from Washington, Oregon, and California on the coasts. Saddleback gunnel also appears to have Canadian populations migrating to these areas during the cold winter months.

Pholis ornata are commonly found in estuaries on the west coast of the U.S., including in the northeast Pacific West coast, and Yaquina Bay, Oregon, sharing community with other marine fishes that line near the shore such as the Pacific staghorn sculpin and rockfishes. In these estuaries, eelgrass beds are an important feature in Pholis ornata's habitat, acting as nurseries and living areas for the fish. Eelgrass beds provide highly diverse fish and other organismal populations and communities.

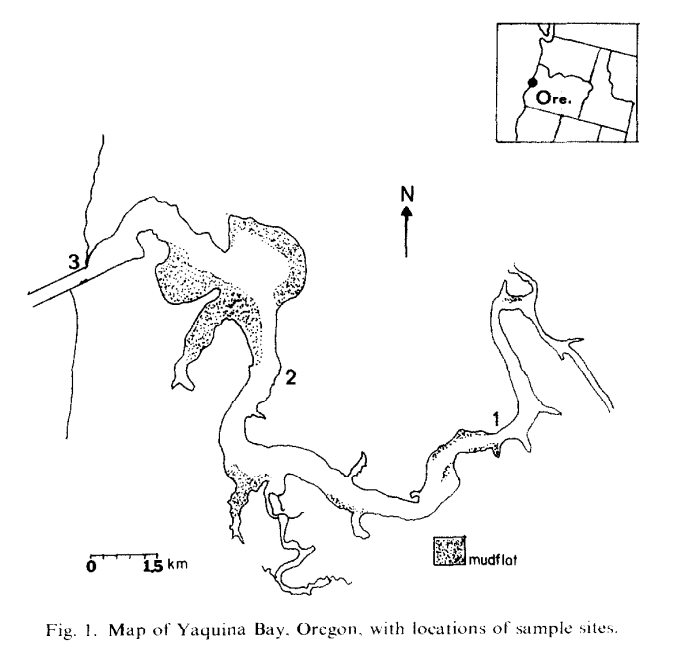
Map of Yaquina Bay, Oregon.(Barton)

In Yaquina Bay, Oregon, Pholis ornata is found in the upper parts of the bay influenced by freshwater. Additionally, seasonal patterns were observed to impact the Pholis ornata's population numbers in Yaquina Bay throughout the year. Population density is higher in late winter to early spring due to increased post-larval individuals inhabiting rocky intertidal areas. Second, the population's intertidal vertical range lowers during the summer. By the summer, the fish are up to 45 mm. The fish are present in lower intertidal zones in the summer, but not in higher intertidal zones at this season. As the temperatures warm and the day length lengthens in the warmer seasons, more plant matter grows in plant beds and mudflats, increasing the population of P. ornata to an impressive size. The plant beds have high numbers of P. ornata inhabiting in the summer. This is observed in other Oregon coastal estuaries in addition to Yaquina Bay. The seasonal growth of plant beds on the mudflats supports the mobility of the fish. By the fall and winter, the fish returns back to inhabiting the higher intertidal zone as well. Pholis ornata are also observed to eagerly inhabit and hide in seasonally available plants that act as cover for the fish. In Yaquina Bay, P. ornata also settle onto the intertidal rocks when algal growth is low.

== Significance ==
Pholis ornata are also an important part of the ecosystem in Puget Sound, a culturally and economically body of water in the Pacific Northwest. Puget Sound is a 2,000 km body of water in northwest Washington, and is considered an iconic water body. One of its most prominent traits are the eelgrass beds, which Pholis ornata often inhabit.

Pholis ornata, along with other fish species in this area, can be used as researchers and fishermen as an indicator of a healthy and diverse ecosystem. Healthy eelgrass meadows with diverse fish populations, including P. ornata, are beneficial to nearshore-ecosystem health and commercial fisheries. Additionally, eelgrass benefits P. ornata by trapping contaminants in the sediments by shifting how the sediment erodes, deposits, and retains particles. This process protects fish like P. ornata by reducing contaminants in the fish's habitats.
