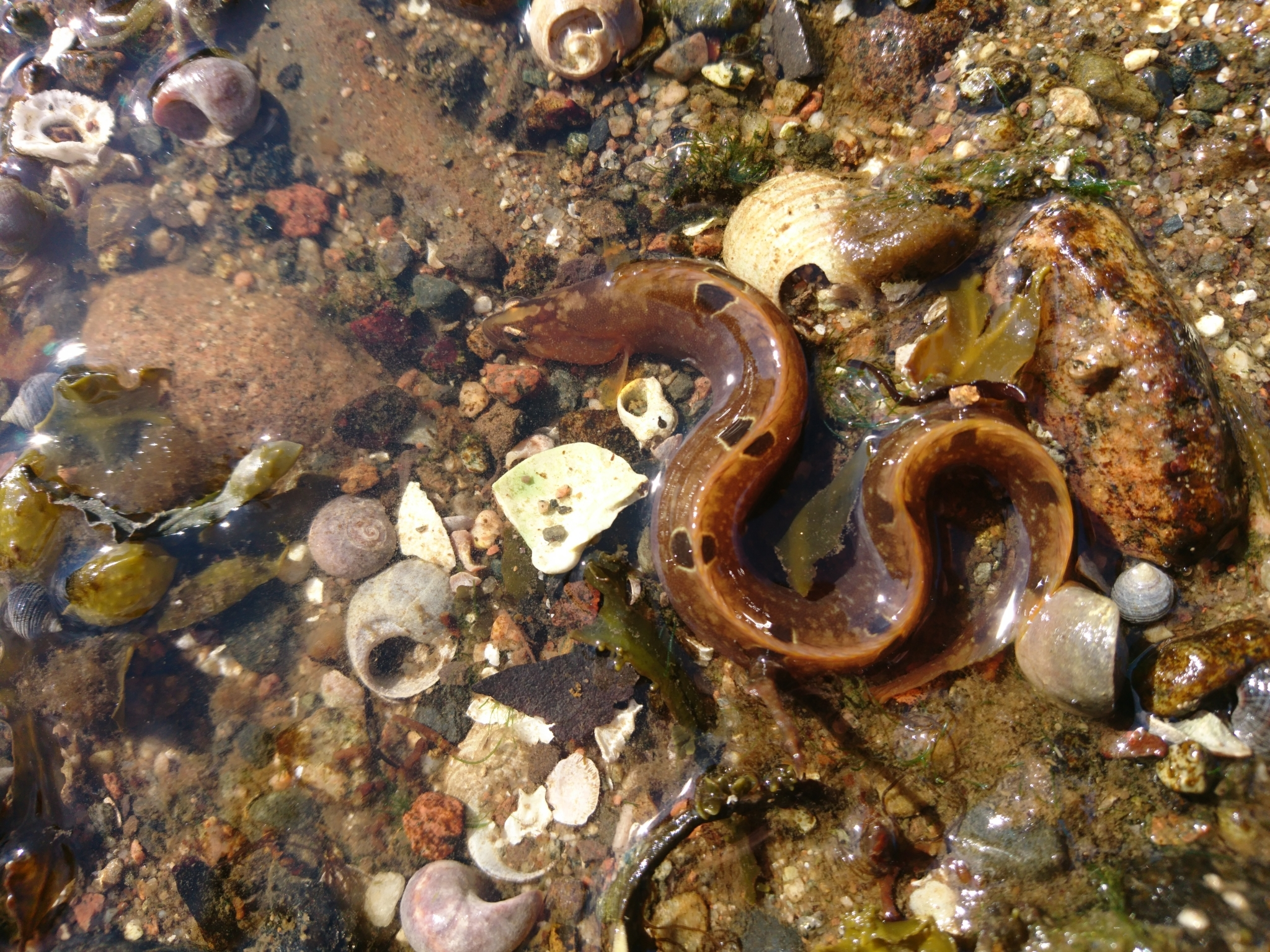

Scientific classification
- Kingdom: Animalia
- Phylum: Chordata
- Class: Actinopterygii
- Division: Teleostei
- Order: Perciformes
- Family: Pholidae
- Genus: Pholis
- Species: P. gunnellus

Binomial name
- Pholis gunnellus (Linnaeus, 1758)

Synonyms
- Blennius gunnellus Linnaeus, 1758; Centronotus gunnellus (Linnaeus, 1758); Ophidion imberbe Linnaeus, 1758; Gunnellus cornubiensium Seba, 1759; Blennius europaeus Olafsen, 1772; Blennius muraenoides Zuiew, 1779; Muraenoides sujef Lacépède, 1800; Ophidium fulvescens Rafinesque, 1810; Ophidium mucronatum Mitchill, 1815; Gunnellus vulgaris Fleming, 1828; Muraenoides guttata Yarrell, 1836; Gunnellus affinis Reinhardt, 1837; Gunnellus macrocephalus Girard, 1850; Gunnellus ingens Storer, 1850

= Rock gunnel =

Species of fish

The rock gunnel (Pholis gunnellus), or butterfish, is a species of marine ray-finned fish belonging to the family Pholidae, the gunnels. This species is found in the coastal waters of the North Atlantic Ocean and in the Atlantic part of the Arctic Ocean.

== Taxonomy ==
The rock gunnel was first formally described in 1758 as Blennius gunnellus in the 10th edition of the Systema Naturae by Carl Linnaeus with the type locality given as the Atlantic. In 1777 by the Italian naturalist Giovanni Antonio Scopoli proposed the genus Pholis and Linnaeus's Blennius gunnellus was later designated to be its type species. The specific name gunnellis is a latinisation of an English, possibly originating in Cornwall, local name for this species, gunnel.

== Description ==
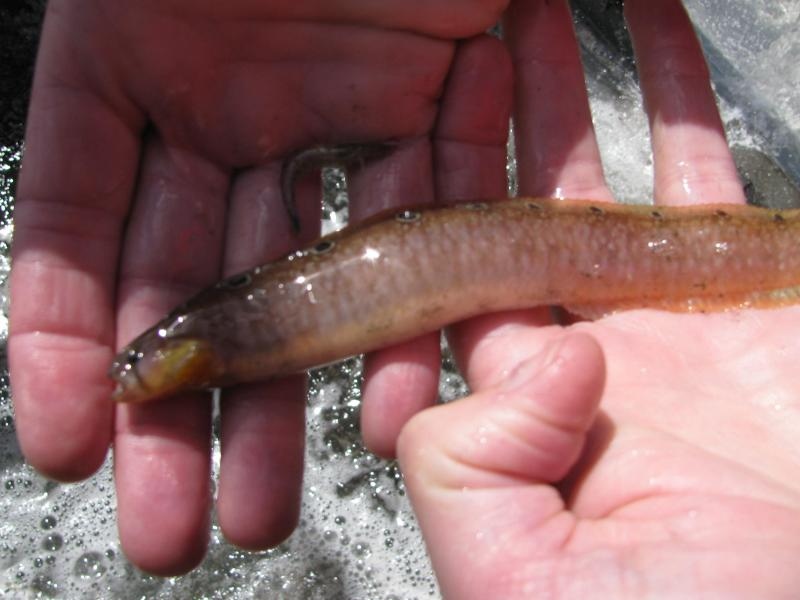

The rock gunnel is often mistaken for an eel due to its flattened, elongated body. Fully grown adults can reach 30 cm in length. A long dorsal fin spans the body from just behind the head, supported by soft spiny rays. Its anal fin begins roughly midway along the body. The head is rather small with its lower jaw protruding and mouth turned upwards. Coloration is highly variable, ranging from hues of yellow-green to brown to crimson. A row of 9–13 dark spots, each surrounded by a pale ring, lines the dorsal fin. The butterfish has a maximum published standard length of 25 cm (9.8 in).

== Distribution and habitat ==
The rock gunnel is found in the coastal waters of North America and Europe. It ranges from Labrador and Greenland to Delaware Bay in the West Atlantic, and from the Kanin Peninsula to the Bay of Biscay in the East Atlantic. Within its range it is found from the intertidal zone to depths of over 100 m. The rock gunnel uses habitat sheltered by rocks and algae both above and below the waterline, likely to protect it from its natural predators, which include seabirds, fish, and marine mammals.

== Behavior ==
The rock gunnel may remain above the waterline at low tide, sheltered beneath rocks and algae, and can breathe air if necessary. They are frequently encountered on rocky shorelines, and splash around noticeably when uncovered. Within its North American range, the rock gunnel disappears from the intertidal during winter, likely to avoid freezing air temperatures. Their diet is made up of small crustaceans, polychaetes, mollusks and the eggs of fish. The female lays the eggs in a large mass on the seabed and this is closely guarded until the larvae hatch. The butterfish spawns from November to January, the female laying between 80 and 200 eggs in a ball-like mass placed beneath a stone or in the empty shell of a bivalve.
