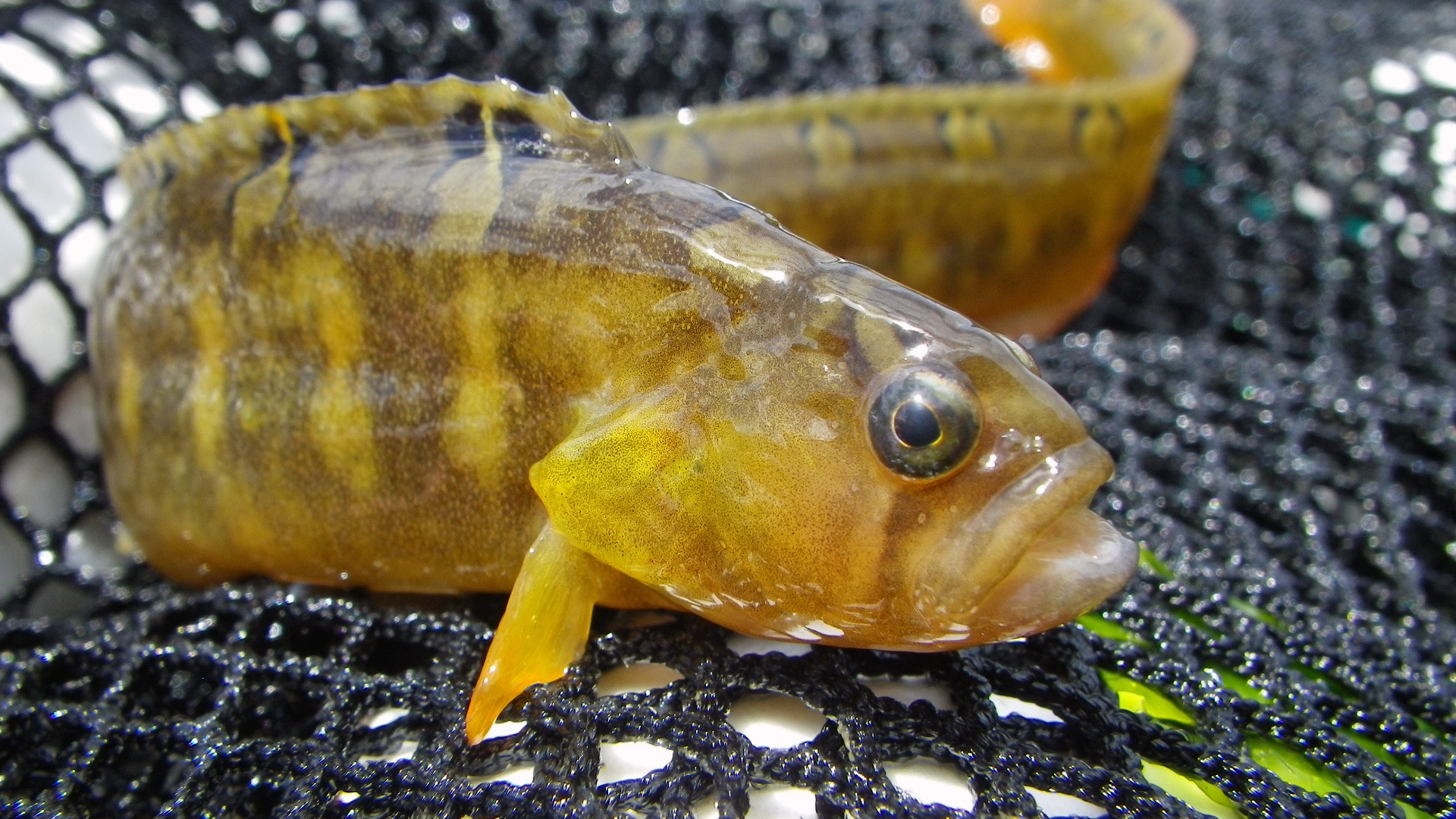

Scientific classification
- Kingdom: Animalia
- Phylum: Chordata
- Class: Actinopterygii
- Order: Perciformes
- Family: Pholidae
- Genus: Pholis
- Species: P. laeta

Binomial name
- Pholis laeta (Cope, 1873)

Synonyms
- Allopholis laeta (Cope, 1873); Centronotus laetus Cope, 1873

= Crescent gunnel =

Species of fish

The crescent gunnel (Pholis laeta), also known as the bracketed blenny, is a species of marine ray-finned fish belonging to the family Pholidae, the gunnels. This fish occurs in the shallow coastal waters of the eastern North Pacific Ocean.

== Taxonomy ==
The crescent gunnel was first formally described in 1873 by the American paleontologist and biologist Edward Drinker Cope with the type locality given as Sitka or Unalaska in Alaska. The specific name laeta means "joyful", "glad" or "pleasant", Cope did not explain his choice of this name but did refer to the types as "rather brilliantly colored" specimens.

== Description ==
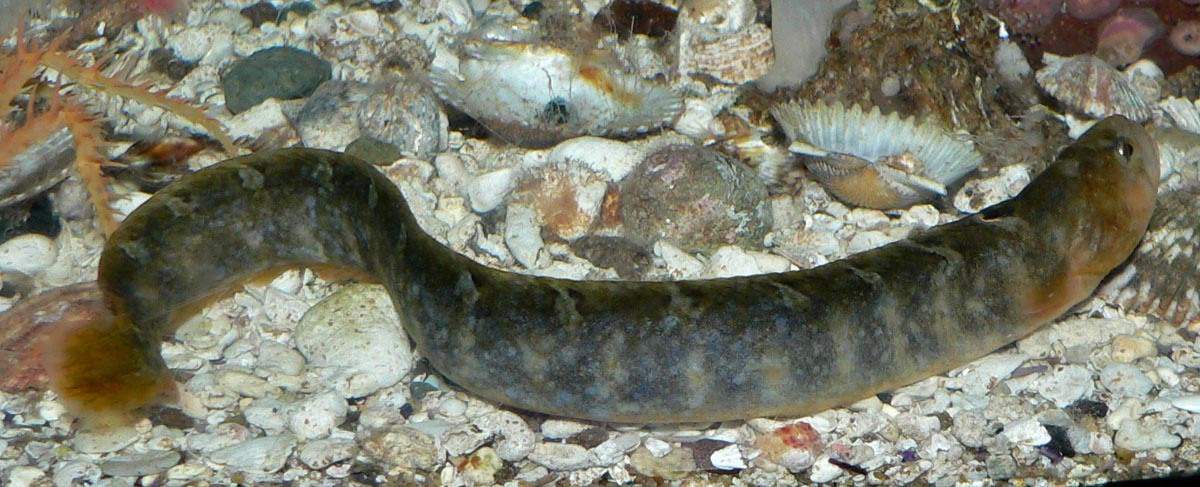
A specimen swimming at Birch Aquarium, San Diego

Pholis laeta, like other gunnels, is somewhat eel-like. It grows to a maximum total length of 25 cm (9.8 in). The dorsal fin contains between 74 and 80 spines and the anal fin contains 35 to 37. soft rays. The caudal fin is rounded and the pelvic fins are tiny. There are two rows of blackish crescent-shaped markings each with a yellow spot in their centers along the back, and these identify this species from other gunnels. The overall color of the body may vary from orange-brown to olive-green, the color being camouflage and color phases vary with habitat.

== Distribution and habitat ==
The crescent gunnel is found in the eastern Pacific along the western coast of North America from the Bering Sea coast of Alaska through the Aleutian Islands south as far as Crescent City in northern California. Pholis laeta lives in shallow, marine areas. It may also be found out of water under seaweed or rocks. It is known to live in the demersal zone at depths of up to 73 metres. This fish is common in such habitats as tide pools and in intertidal environments and may be found under rocks that are protected by seaweed.

== Biology ==
The crescent gunnel reach sexual maturity at approximately 10 cm (3.9 in) in length. The females lay masses of 600 to 1,600 eggs in late winter, January and February. The demersal eggs stick to each other and to the substrate and are sometimes guarded by one of the parents. They hatch into larvae after 2 months and join the plankton. In Alaska colder water temperatures can delay breeding. They can live for up to 6 years.

The crescent gunnels likely eats marine worms as well as small species of crustacean. It is an important prey item for larger vertebrate predators and these include great blue heron (Ardea herodias), pigeon guillemot (Cepphus columba), North American river otter (Lontra canadensis), American mink (Mustela vison), and larger fishes. However, have been found to be a lower quality food for pigeon guillemot chicks and pairs that caught a high number of crescent gunnels do not show high reproductive success. These fishes hide in rockpools or tiny crevices under rocks or in vegetation, they may even emerge fully from water at low tide, and are apparently able to breathe air not submerged.
