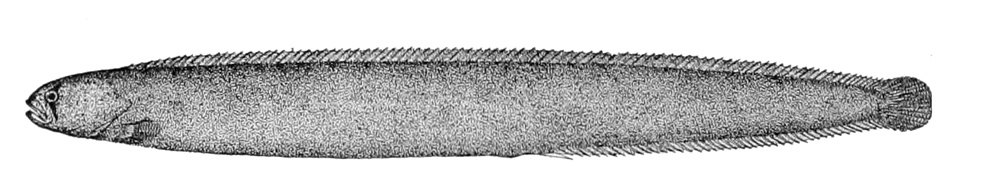

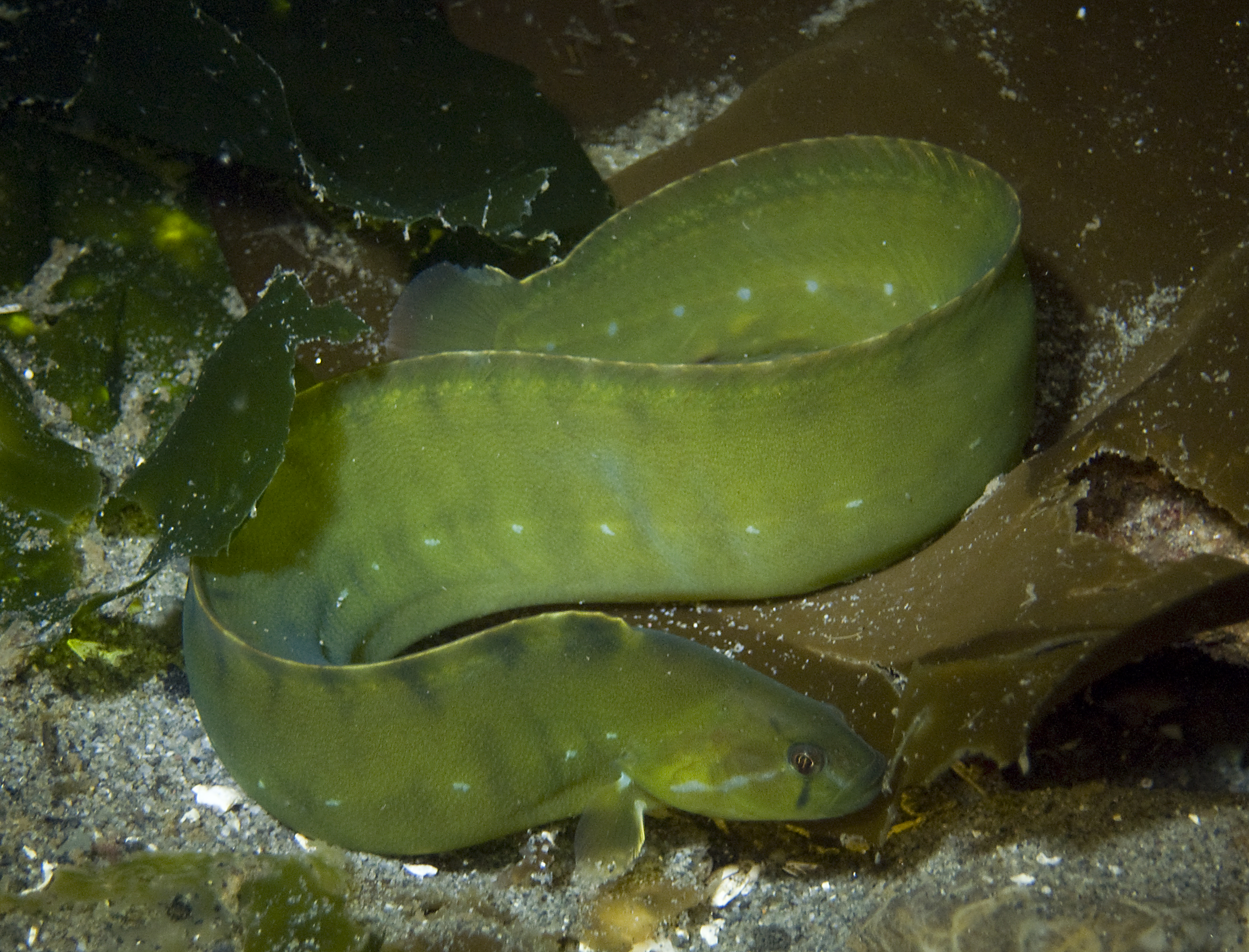
- Penpoint gunnel near Seattle, WA

Scientific classification
- Kingdom: Animalia
- Phylum: Chordata
- Class: Actinopterygii
- Order: Perciformes
- Family: Pholidae
- Genus: Apodichthys
- Species: A. flavidus

Binomial name
- Apodichthys flavidus Girard, 1854

= Penpoint gunnel =

Species of fish

The penpoint gunnel (Apodichthys flavidus) is a species of marine ray-finned fish belonging to the family Pholidae, the gunnels. This fish occurs in the eastern North Pacific Ocean.

== Taxonomy ==
The penpoint gunnel was first formally described in 1854 by the French biologist Charles Frédéric Girard with the type locality given as Presidio, San Francisco, California. In 1898 David Starr Jordan and Barton Warren Evermann designated this species as the type species of the genus Apodichthys. The specific name flavidus means "yellowish", Girard described its body as being uniform yellowish in color with a slight grayish tint.

== Distribution and habitat ==
The penpoint gunnel is mainly found in intertidal areas at depths between 0 and 1.8 m (0.0 and 5.9 ft). Geographically, it occurs from the Pacific coast of North America, ranging from Kodiak Island in the Gulf of Alaska to Santa Barbara Island in southern California. It can sometimes be seen in tide pools, also in eelgrass beds, sea lettuce beds, and in stands of kelp. It commonly takes on the color of the vegetation it inhabits. If there is no vegetation (in winter, for example), it can also inhabit rocky areas, lurking under rocks and in protective crevices. However, it can also remain out of the water under rocks or seaweeds. The penpoint gunnel can breathe air when out of water.

== Description ==
Penpoint gunnels varies in color and can be green, maroon, or brown. This species attains a maximum published total length up to 46 cm (18 in). It most easily distinguished by the dark bar below each eye, as it is commonly found peeking out of a kelp bed or crevice. There is a row of dark and/or pale spots along the midbody and commonly a series of short, pale bar-like marking extending down from the top of the dorsal fin. The first spine of the anal fin is large and grooved like a fountain pen point. It has a continuous dorsal, tail and anal fins, but no ventral fins. The tail is defined by slightly longer rays. The anal fin is about half the length of the dorsal fin. This is an elongated fish which has long based low dorsal and anal fins. The dorsal fin contains between 40 and 44 spines while the anal fin has a single spine and 38 to 42 soft rays. The caudal fin is rounded and the pectoral fins are small and rounded.

== Biology ==
Penpoint gunnels feed on small crustaceans and mollusks. Pairs are found coiled around egg masses.
