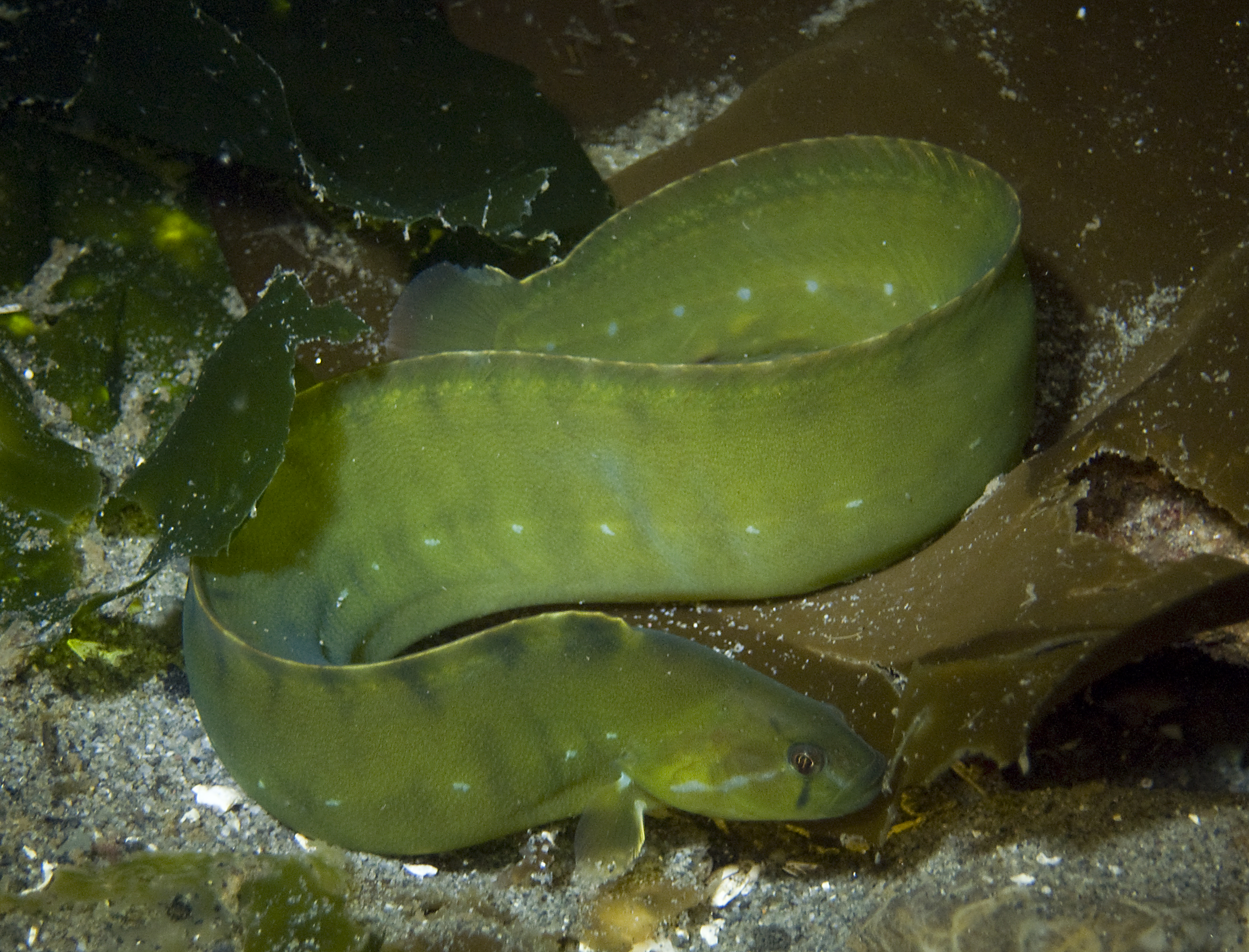
- Penpoint gunnel (Apodichthys flavidus) near Seattle

Scientific classification
- Kingdom: Animalia
- Phylum: Chordata
- Class: Actinopterygii
- Order: Perciformes
- Family: Pholidae
- Subfamily: Apodichthyinae
- Genus: Apodichthys; Girard, 1854

Type species
- Apodichthys flavidus Girard, 1854

Synonyms
- Xererpes Jordan & Gilbert, 1895

= Apodichthys =

Genus of fishes

Apodichthys is a small genus of marine ray-finned fishes belonging to the family Pholidae, the gunnels. These fishes are found in the eastern Pacific Ocean.

== Species ==
Apodichthys contains 2 species:

- Apodichthys flavidus Girard, 1854 (Penpoint gunnel)
- Apodichthys fucorum Jordan & Gilbert, 1895 (Rockweed gunnel)
