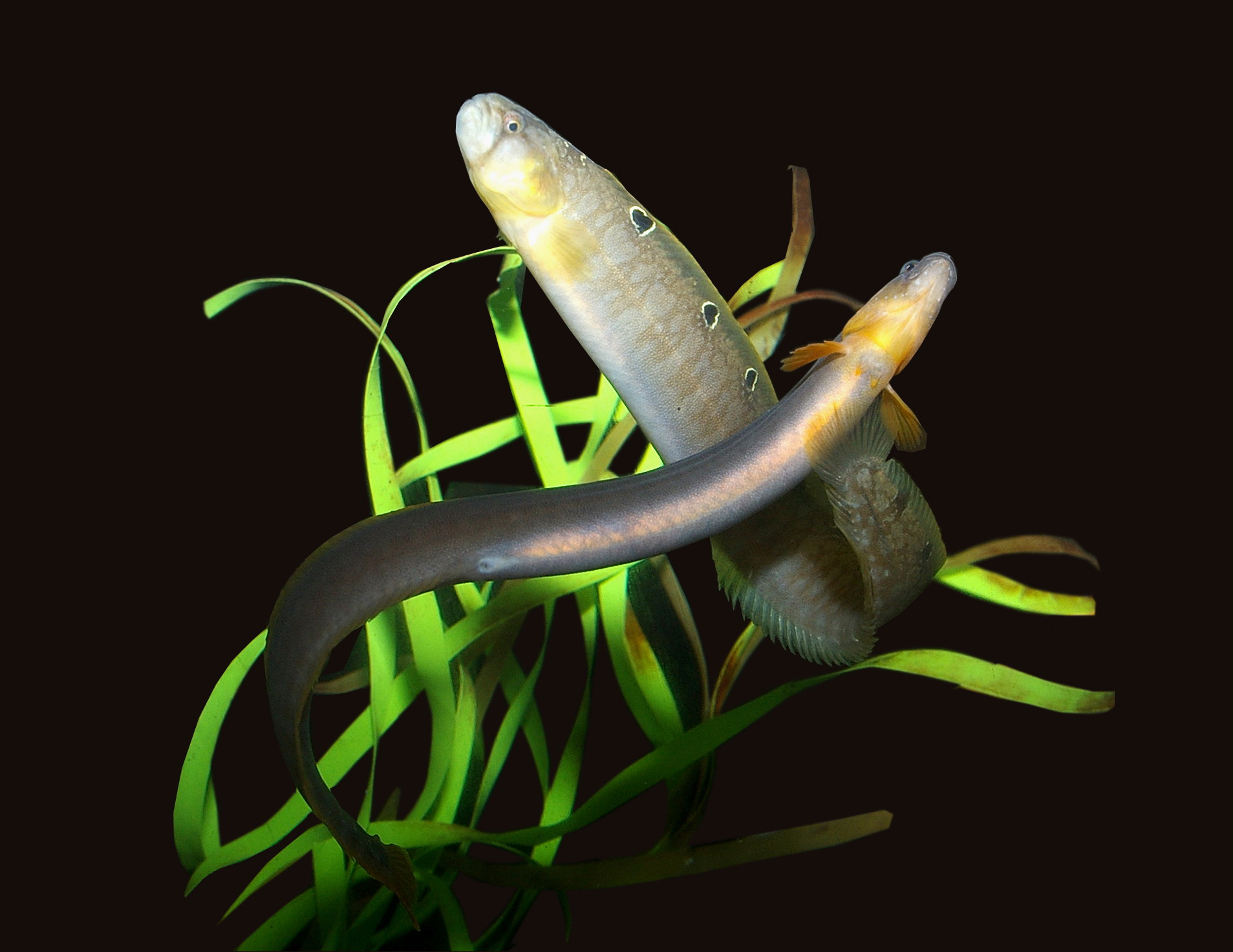
- Rock gunnel (Pholis gunnellus)

Scientific classification
- Kingdom: Animalia
- Phylum: Chordata
- Class: Actinopterygii
- Division: Teleostei
- Order: Perciformes
- Family: Pholidae
- Genus: Pholis; Scopoli, 1777

Type species
- Blennius gunnellus Linnaeus, 1758

Synonyms
- Allopholis Yatsu, 1981; Centronotus Bloch & Schneider, 1801; Dactyleptus Rafinesque,1815; Enedrias Jordan & Gilbert, 1898; Gunnellus Fleming, 1828; Muraenoides Lacépède, 1800; Ophisomus Swainson, 1839; Urocentrus Kner, 1868

= Pholis =

Genus of fish

Pholis is a genus of marine ray-finned fish belonging to the family Pholidae, the gunnels. These fishes are found in shallow coastal waters of the North Pacific, Arctic and North Atlantic Oceans.

== Taxonomy ==
Pholis was first proposed as a genus in 1777 by the Italian naturalist Giovanni Antonio Scopoli. The type species was later designated to be Blennius gunnellus, which Linnaeus had described in 1758 in the 10th edition of the Systema Naturae. The genus is the only genus in the monotypic subfamily Pholinae, one of two subfamilies in the family Pholidae. The genus name Pholis is an Ancient Greek name for a fish that hides in a hole, the name dating at least as far back in history to Aristotle.

== Species ==
Pholis contains 11 species:

- Pholis clemensi Rosenblatt, 1964
- Pholis crassispina (Temminck & Schlegel, 1845)
- Pholis fangi (Wang & Wang, 1935)
- Pholis fasciata Bloch & Schneider, 1801)
- Pholis gunnellus (Linnaeus, 1758)
- Pholis laeta (Cope, 1873)
- Pholis nea Peden & Hughes, 1984
- Pholis nebulosa (Temminck & Schlegel, 1845)
- Pholis ornata (Girard, 1854)
- Pholis picta (Kner, 1868)
- Pholis schultzi Schultz, 1931

== Characteristics ==
Pholis species have the elongate, compressed bodies of other gunnels. They differ on that there is no interorbital pore and that the head lacks scales or has small scales which are only present in larger adults. These fishes vary in maximum published total length varying from 7.9 cm (3.1 in) in P. nea and 31 cm (12 in) in P. picta.

== Distribution, habitat and biology ==
Pholis gunnels are predominantly found in the temperate and boreal wasters of the North Pacific Ocean but P. fasciatus and P. gunnellus are found in the Arctic and North Atlantic Oceans, the only gunnels to occur outside the Pacific Ocean. These fishes are found in rocky areas in the intertidal zone and in the shallow waters below the low tide mark. They feed on invertebrates and fish eggs. They are oviparous, laying eggs in a large mass which is guarded.
