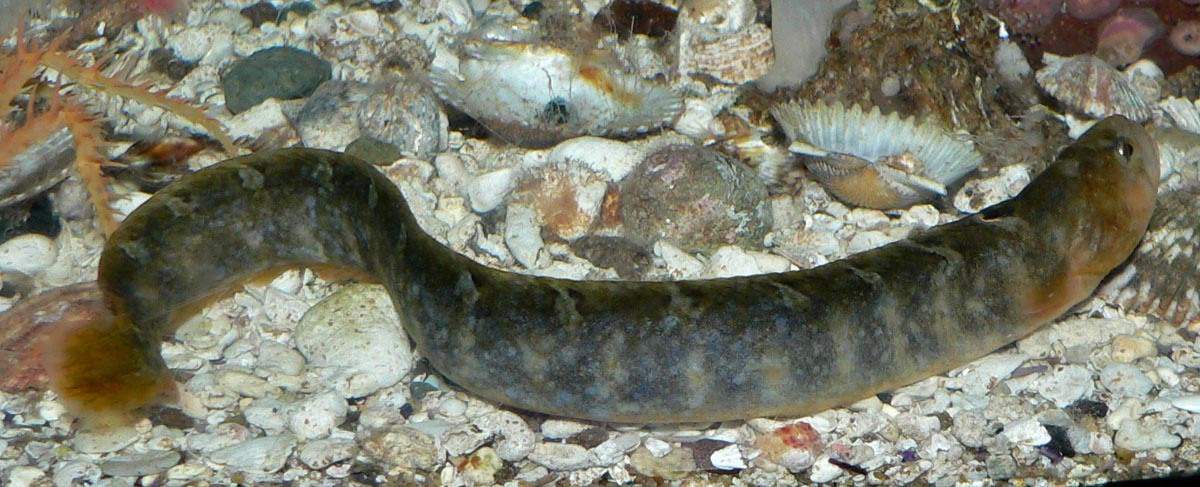
- Crescent gunnel, Pholis laeta

Scientific classification
- Kingdom: Animalia
- Phylum: Chordata
- Class: Actinopterygii
- Order: Perciformes
- Suborder: Zoarcoidei
- Family: Pholidae; Gill, 1893

Subfamilies and genera
- See text

= Pholidae =

Gunnels Temporal range: Middle Miocene to present

Family of fishes

Pholidae is a family of marine ray-finned fishes, known as gunnels, in the scorpaeniform suborder Zoarcoidei. These are fishes of the littoral zone and are mainly found in North Pacific Ocean, with two species found in the North Atlantic Ocean and Arctic Ocean.

== Taxonomy ==
Pholidae was first put forward as a family in 1893 by the American zoologist Theodore Gill. The 5th edition of Fishes of the World classifies this family within the suborder Zoarcoidei, within the order Scorpaeniformes. Other authorities classify this family in the infraorder Zoarcales within the suborder Cottoidei of the Perciformes because removing the Scorpaeniformes from the Perciformes renders that taxon non monophyletic.

=== Etymology and spelling ===
Pholidae is derived from the name of the type genus Pholis which is an Ancient Greek name for a fish that hides in a hole, the name dating at least as far in history as Aristotle.

The family has been spelled as Pholididae, and this is grammatically correct, but Article 29 of the International Code of Zoological Nomenclature permits the use of Pholidae.

=== Subfamilies and genera ===
The family is classified as follows:

- Genus †Agnevichthys Nazarkin, 2002 (Middle Miocene of Sakhalin, Russia)
- Genus †Palaeopholis Nazarkin, 2002 (Middle Miocene of Sakhalin, Russia)
- Subfamily Pholinae Gill, 1893
  - Genus Pholis Scopoli, 1777
- Subfamily Apodichthyinae Hubbs, 1927
  - Genus Apodichthys Girard, 1854
  - Genus Rhodymenichthys Jordan & Evermann, 1896
  - Genus Ulvicola Gilbert & Starks, 1897

== Characteristics ==
Pholidae, the gunnels, have elongate, compressed bodies which resemble that of blennies. There is a single continuous dorsal fin, which has a base that is roughly double the length to that of the anal fin, the dorsal fin extends from the head to the caudal fin. The dorsal fin contains between 73 and 100 stiff spines while the anal fin has between 1 and 3 spines and 32 to 53 soft rays. The anal fin and the dorsal fin are joined to the rounded caudal fin. Some species have no pectoral fins but where they are present they are very small. The pelvic fins are also small, if present, and very simple with a single spine and a single soft ray. There is a single pair of nostrils. The body is covered with very small, difficult to see, cycloid scales which are covered in mucus. the sensory canals on the head have pores which are open to the outside. The lateral line runs along the middle of the flanks and is made up of a row of superficial neuromasts. The teeth are small and conical. The gill membranes have a wide joining and they are separate from the isthmus. There are no ribs. They are camouflaged fishes with coloration which can be yellow and brown to red or green, frequently they are marked with spots, blotches, and bands. The largest species is the penpoint gunnel (Apodichthys flavidus} which attains a maximum published total length of 46 cm (18 in) while the smallest is Pholis nea which has a maximum published total length of 7.9 cm (3.1 in).

== Distribution, habitat and biology ==
Pholidae gunnels are predominantly found in the North Pacific Ocean off the western coasts of North America and the eastern coasts of Asia, except for two species in the genus Pholis which are found in the Arctic and North Atlantic Oceans. They are mostly found in rocky intertidal and nearby shallow waters below the tide line, particularly in areas of kelp and other seaweeds. They frequently hide under rocks and in rock pools in the intertidal zone. Their diet is made up of small crustaceans and molluscs.
