= Bridge duckbill eel =

Conservation status
- Least Concern (IUCN 3.1)

Scientific classification
- Kingdom: Animalia
- Phylum: Chordata
- Class: Actinopterygii
- Order: Anguilliformes
- Family: Nettastomatidae
- Genus: Nettenchelys
- Species: N. gephyra

Binomial name
- Nettenchelys gephyra Castle & Smith, 1981

Species of fish

The bridge duckbill eel (Nettenchelys gephyra) is an eel in the family Nettastomatidae (duckbill/witch eels). It was described by Peter Henry John Castle and David G. Smith in 1981. It is a marine, deep water-dwelling eel which is known from the western Pacific Ocean, including New Caledonia, the Philippines, and Indonesia. It dwells at a depth range of 400–412 metres (1,312–1,352 ft). Females can reach a maximum total length of 43.1 centimetres (17.0 in).

The species epithet "gephyra" means "bridge" in Ancient Greek, and refers to the link the species provides between the species Nettenchelys pygmaeus and Nettenchelys inion.
