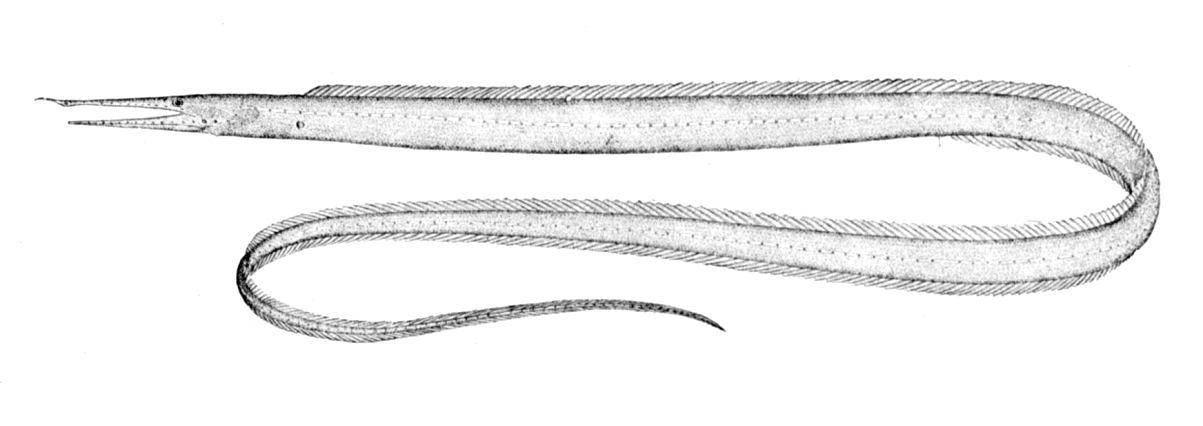

Conservation status
- Least Concern (IUCN 3.1)

Scientific classification
- Kingdom: Animalia
- Phylum: Chordata
- Class: Actinopterygii
- Order: Anguilliformes
- Family: Nettastomatidae
- Genus: Venefica
- Species: V. procera

Binomial name
- Venefica procera (Goode & Bean, 1883)

Synonyms
- Nettastoma procerum Goode & Bean, 1883

= Venefica procera =

Species of fish

Venefica procera is an eel in the family Nettastomatidae (duckbill/witch eels). It was described by George Brown Goode and Tarleton Hoffman Bean in 1883, originally under the genus Nettastoma. It is a marine, deep water-dwelling eel which is known from the western central Atlantic Ocean, including North Carolina, USA, Suriname, the Gulf of Mexico and the Caribbean Sea. It dwells at a depth range of 326 to 2,304 meters (1,070 to 7,559 ft). Males can reach a maximum total length of 109 centimeters (43 in).
