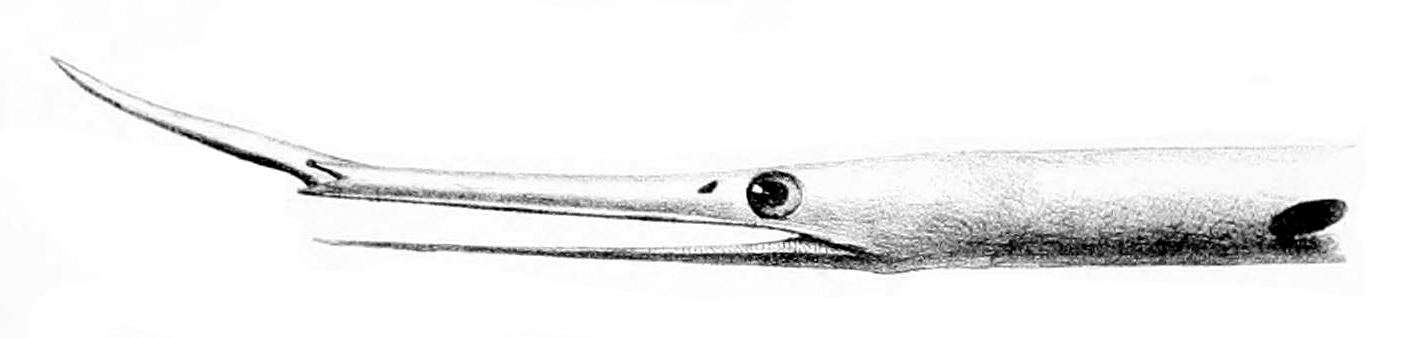

Conservation status
- Least Concern (IUCN 3.1)

Scientific classification
- Kingdom: Animalia
- Phylum: Chordata
- Class: Actinopterygii
- Order: Anguilliformes
- Family: Nettastomatidae
- Genus: Venefica
- Species: V. proboscidea

Binomial name
- Venefica proboscidea (Vaillant, 1888)

Synonyms
- Nettastoma proboscideum Vaillant, 1888

= Whipsnout sorcerer =

Species of fish

The whipsnout sorcerer (Venefica proboscidea) is an eel in the family Nettastomatidae (duckbill/witch eels). It was described by Léon Vaillant in 1888, originally under the genus Nettastoma. It is a marine, deep water-dwelling eel which is known from tropical, subtropical and temperate areas throughout the world. It dwells at a depth range of 385 to 2,200 metres (1,263 to 7,218 ft), and inhabits the lower region of the continental slope. Males can reach a maximum total length of 100 centimetres (39 in).
