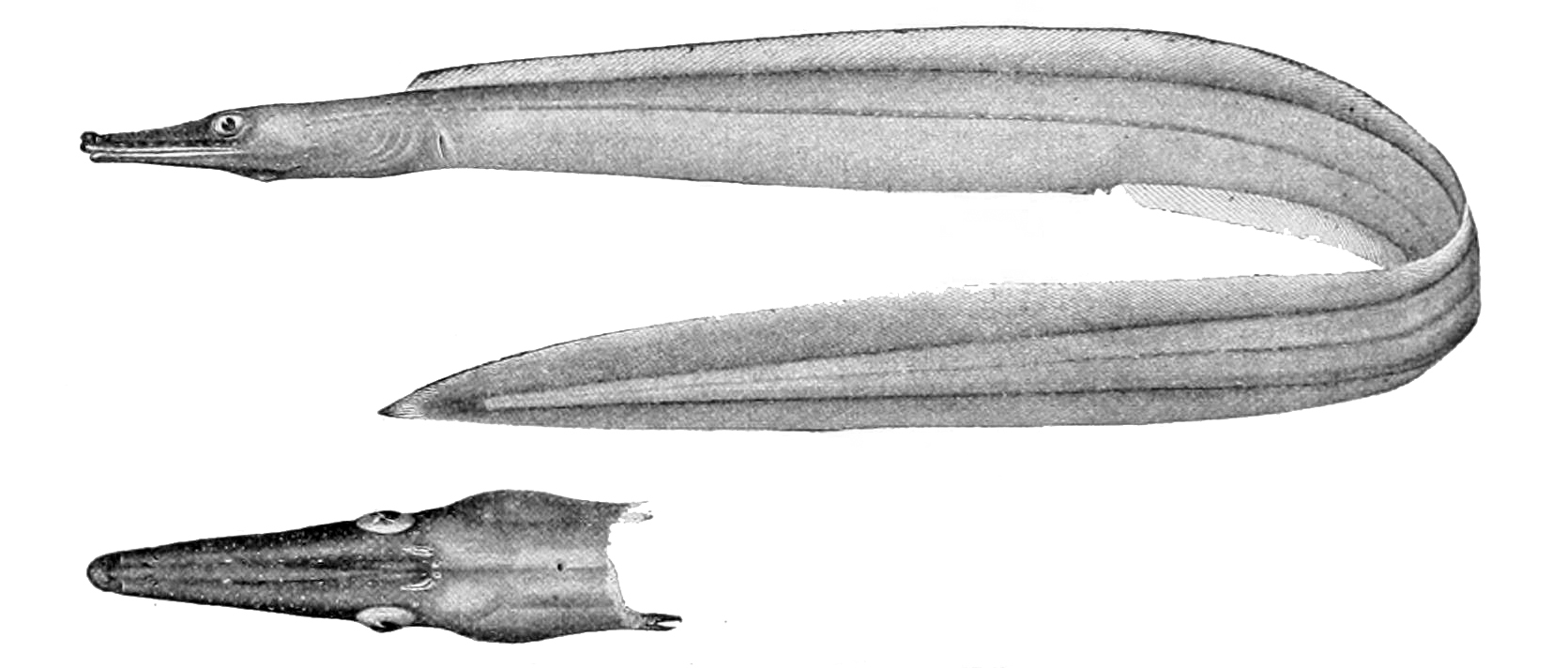

Scientific classification
- Domain: Eukaryota
- Kingdom: Animalia
- Phylum: Chordata
- Class: Actinopterygii
- Order: Anguilliformes
- Family: Nettastomatidae
- Genus: Nettastoma
- Species: N. parviceps

Binomial name
- Nettastoma parviceps Günther, 1877

Synonyms
- Metopomycter parviceps (Günther, 1877); Metopomycter denticulatus Gilbert, 1905; Nettastoma denticulatus (Gilbert, 1905)

= Duck-billed eel =

Species of fish

The duck-billed eel (Nettastoma parviceps), also known as the shortsnouted sorcerer or the smallhead duckbill eel, is an eel in the family Nettastomatidae (duckbill/witch eels). It was described by Albert Günther in 1877. It is a marine, deep water-dwelling eel, which is known from the Indo-Pacific and the southeastern Pacific Ocean, including Japan, Hawaii, eastern Australia, southeastern Africa, and Chile. It dwells at a depth range of 60–1190 metres, and inhabits the continental shelf and slope. Males can reach a maximum total length of 83 centimetres.

The species epithet "parviceps" means "little head" in Latin, and refers to the eel's head being somewhat smaller than that of Nettastoma melanura, which was the only other species in the genus known to the author. The duck-billed eel is of no commercial interest to fisheries.
