= Hoplunnis sicarius =

Scientific classification
- Kingdom: Animalia
- Phylum: Chordata
- Class: Actinopterygii
- Order: Anguilliformes
- Family: Nettastomatidae
- Genus: Hoplunnis
- Species: H. sicarius

Binomial name
- Hoplunnis sicarius (Garman, 1899)

Synonyms
- Atopichthys sicarius Garman, 1899

Species of fish

Hoplunnis sicarius is an eel in the family Nettastomatidae (duckbill/witch eels). It was described by Samuel Garman in 1899, originally under the genus Atopichthys. It is a marine, tropical eel which is known from the eastern central Pacific Ocean, including Mazatlan, Mexico, and Panama. It is known to dwell at a depth of 1,431 metres (4,695 ft), and inhabits substrates. Unlike many eel species, it does not form burrows.
