= Nettenchelys exoria =

Conservation status
- Least Concern (IUCN 3.1)

Scientific classification
- Kingdom: Animalia
- Phylum: Chordata
- Class: Actinopterygii
- Order: Anguilliformes
- Family: Nettastomatidae
- Genus: Nettenchelys
- Species: N. exoria

Binomial name
- Nettenchelys exoria Böhlke & Smith, 1981

Synonyms
- Nettenchelys exorius Böhlke & Smith, 1981

Species of fish

Nettenchelys exoria is an eel in the family Nettastomatidae (duckbill/witch eels). It was described by James Erwin Böhlke and David G. Smith in 1981. It is a marine, deep water-dwelling eel which is known from the western central Atlantic Ocean, including Florida, USA and the Bahamas. It dwells at a depth range of 277 to 494 meters (909 to 1,621 ft). Males can reach a maximum total length of 46.7 centimeters (18.4 in).

The species epithet "exoria" is derived from the Greek word "exorios", meaning "beyond the frontier", and refers to the posterior nostrils being located at the back of the head.
