= Blacktail buckbill eel =

Scientific classification
- Kingdom: Animalia
- Phylum: Chordata
- Class: Actinopterygii
- Division: Teleostei
- Order: Anguilliformes
- Family: Nettastomatidae
- Genus: Saurenchelys
- Species: S. fierasfer

Binomial name
- Saurenchelys fierasfer (Jordan & Snyder, 1901)

Synonyms
- Chlopsis fierasfer Jordan & Snyder, 1901

Species of fish

The blacktail buckbill eel (Saurenchelys fierasfer), also known commonly as the blacktail duckbill, or the duckbill eel in Malaysia, is an eel in the family Nettastomatidae (duckbill/witch eels). It was described by David Starr Jordan and John Otterbein Snyder in 1901, originally under the genus Chlopsis. It is a marine, tropical eel which is known from the western Pacific Ocean, including Japan, China, Malaysia, the Philippines, and Taiwan. It is known to dwell at a depth range of 100 to 500 meters (330 to 1,640 ft). Males can reach a maximum total length of 50 centimeters (20 in).

Due to its wide distribution and tendency to dwell in deep waters, the IUCN redlist currently lists the blacktail buckbill eel as Least Concern. It notes, however, that the eel occurs in a region heavily affected by fisheries, and may be caught as by-catch despite not being of commercial interest.
