= Saurenchelys meteori =

Scientific classification
- Domain: Eukaryota
- Kingdom: Animalia
- Phylum: Chordata
- Class: Actinopterygii
- Order: Anguilliformes
- Family: Nettastomatidae
- Genus: Saurenchelys
- Species: S. meteori

Binomial name
- Saurenchelys meteori Klausewitz & Zajonz, 2000

Species of fish

Saurenchelys meteori is an eel in the family Nettastomatidae (duckbill/witch eels). It was described by Wolfgang Klausewitz and Uwe Zajonz in 2000. It is a marine, deep water-dwelling eel which is known from the western Indian Ocean, including Djibouti, Eritrea, Egypt, Saudi Arabia, Sudan, Yemen and Somalia. It is known to dwell at a depth range of 696 to 705 metres (2,283 to 2,313 ft). Males can reach a maximum total length of 44.2 centimetres (17.4 in).

== Etymology ==
The species epithet "meteori" refers to the German research vessel Meteor.

== Extinction ==
The IUCN redlist currently lists S. meteori as Least Concern, due to its deep water habitat and the presumed lack of major threats thereof.
