= Silver pikeconger =

Scientific classification
- Kingdom: Animalia
- Phylum: Chordata
- Class: Actinopterygii
- Division: Teleostei
- Order: Anguilliformes
- Family: Nettastomatidae
- Genus: Hoplunnis
- Species: H. pacifica

Binomial name
- Hoplunnis pacifica Lane & Stewart, 1968

Species of fish

The silver pikeconger (Hoplunnis pacifica) is an eel in the family Nettastomatidae (duckbill/witch eels). It was described by E. David Lane and Kenneth W. Stewart in 1968. It is a marine, tropical eel with habitats in the Gulf of California and northern Peru. They can reach a maximum total length of 35 centimetres (14 in) and live in water with depths between 40 and 275 meters.
