= Hoplunnis similis =

Scientific classification
- Domain: Eukaryota
- Kingdom: Animalia
- Phylum: Chordata
- Class: Actinopterygii
- Order: Anguilliformes
- Family: Nettastomatidae
- Genus: Hoplunnis
- Species: H. similis

Binomial name
- Hoplunnis similis Smith, 1989

Species of fish

Hoplunnis similis is an eel in the family Nettastomatidae (duckbill/witch eels). It was described by David G. Smith in 1989. It is a marine, deep water-dwelling eel which is known from the western central Atlantic Ocean, including Florida, USA, Honduras and Nicaragua. It is known to dwell at a depth range of 146 to 329 meters (479 to 1,079 ft). Males can reach a maximum total length of 49.3 centimeters (19.4 in).
