= Hoplunnis schmidti =

Scientific classification
- Kingdom: Animalia
- Phylum: Chordata
- Class: Actinopterygii
- Order: Anguilliformes
- Family: Nettastomatidae
- Genus: Hoplunnis
- Species: H. schmidti

Binomial name
- Hoplunnis schmidti Kaup, 1860

Synonyms
- Hoplunnis schmidtii Kaup, 1859

Species of fish

Hoplunnis schmidti is an eel in the family Nettastomatidae (duckbill/witch eels). It was described by Johann Jakob Kaup in 1860. It is a marine, tropical eel which is known from Venezuela, in the western central Atlantic Ocean.

Due to a lack of known major threats to H. schmidti, the IUCN redlist currently lists it as Least Concern.
