= Whitsunday (disambiguation) =

Whitsunday, also known as Whitsun, is the celebration in England of the Christian feast of Pentecost, observed 7 weeks after Easter.

Whitsunday, Whitsundays and Whit Sunday may also refer to:

- One of the Scottish term days, always falling in modern times on 15 May

== Australia ==
- Whitsunday Islands, an island group in Queensland
- Whitsunday Islands National Park in Queensland
- Whitsunday Island, the largest of the Whitsunday Islands
- Whitsunday Region, a local government area located in North Queensland, Australia
- Whitsundays, Queensland, a locality in the Whitsunday Region which includes the Whitsunday Islands
- Electoral district of Whitsunday, an electoral division in the Legislative Assembly of Queensland, Australia
- Shire of Whitsunday, a former local government area located in North Queensland

== See also ==
- Whitsunday wire eel, found in Australia
