= Pillar wire eel =

Scientific classification
- Domain: Eukaryota
- Kingdom: Animalia
- Phylum: Chordata
- Class: Actinopterygii
- Order: Anguilliformes
- Family: Nettastomatidae
- Genus: Saurenchelys
- Species: S. stylura

Binomial name
- Saurenchelys stylura (Lea, 1913)

Synonyms
- Leptocephalus stylurus Lea, 1913; Saurenchelys stylurus (Lea, 1913)

Species of fish

The pillar wire eel (Saurenchelys stylura) is an eel in the family Nettastomatidae (duckbill/witch eels). It was described by Einar Hagbart Martin Lea in 1913, originally under the genus Leptocephalus. It is a marine, tropical eel which is known from the western Pacific Ocean. It is oceanodromous, and is known to dwell at a depth range of 27 to 460 metres (89 to 1,509 ft).
