= Saurenchelys taiwanensis =

Scientific classification
- Kingdom: Animalia
- Phylum: Chordata
- Class: Actinopterygii
- Order: Anguilliformes
- Family: Nettastomatidae
- Genus: Saurenchelys
- Species: S. taiwanensis

Binomial name
- Saurenchelys taiwanensis Karmovskaya, 2004

Species of fish

Saurenchelys taiwanensis is an eel in the family Nettastomatidae (duckbill/witch eels). It was described by Emma Stanislavovna Karmovskaya in 2004. It is a marine, deep water-dwelling eel which is known from the Philippines, in the western Pacific Ocean. It is known to dwell at a depth range of 1,043 to 1,102 metres (3,422 to 3,615 ft). Males can reach a maximum total length of 34.2 centimetres (13.5 in).

The species epithet "taiwanensis", after Taiwan, was meant to refer to the type locality of the species, despite the holotype specimen being derived from the Philippines.
