= Nettastoma syntresis =

Scientific classification
- Kingdom: Animalia
- Phylum: Chordata
- Class: Actinopterygii
- Division: Teleostei
- Order: Anguilliformes
- Family: Nettastomatidae
- Genus: Nettastoma
- Species: N. syntresis

Binomial name
- Nettastoma syntresis Smith & Böhlke, 1981

Species of fish

Nettastoma syntresis is an eel in the family Nettastomatidae (duckbill/witch eels). It was described by David G. Smith and James Erwin Böhlke in 1981. It is a marine, deep water-dwelling eel which is known from the western central Atlantic Ocean, including the Bahamas, Cuba, and the northeastern Gulf of Mexico. It dwells at a depth range of 0 to 641 metres (0 to 2,103 ft). Males can reach a maximum standard length of 55 centimeters (22 in).

The species epithet "syntresis" means "channel" in Greek, and is treated as a noun in apposition. It refers to several channels in which the species has been found, including the Santaren, Nicholas and Northwest Providence Channels.
