= Nettastoma falcinaris =

Scientific classification
- Kingdom: Animalia
- Phylum: Chordata
- Class: Actinopterygii
- Order: Anguilliformes
- Family: Nettastomatidae
- Genus: Nettastoma
- Species: N. falcinaris

Binomial name
- Nettastoma falcinaris Parin & Karmovskaya, 1985

Species of fish

Nettastoma falcinaris is an eel in the family Nettastomatidae (duckbill/witch eels). It was described by Nikolai Vasilyevich Parin and Emma Stanislavovna Karmovskaya in 1985. It is a marine, deep water-dwelling eel which is known from Chile, in the southeastern Pacific Ocean. It is known to dwell at a depth range of 1,070 to 1,100 metres (3,510 to 3,610 ft). It is deemed harmless to humans.
