= Nettenchelys paxtoni =

Conservation status
- Data Deficient (IUCN 3.1)

Scientific classification
- Kingdom: Animalia
- Phylum: Chordata
- Class: Actinopterygii
- Order: Anguilliformes
- Family: Nettastomatidae
- Genus: Nettenchelys
- Species: N. paxtoni

Binomial name
- Nettenchelys paxtoni Karmovskaya, 1999

Species of fish

Nettenchelys paxtoni is an eel in the family Nettastomatidae (duckbill/witch eels). It was described by Emma Stanislavovna Karmovskaya in 1999. It is a marine, tropical eel which is known from Vanuatu, in the western Pacific Ocean. The only known specimen had a total length of 24.8 centimetres (9.8 in), and was recovered from the stomach contents of a sea snake.

== Etymology ==
The species epithet "paxtoni" was given in honour of John Paxton.
