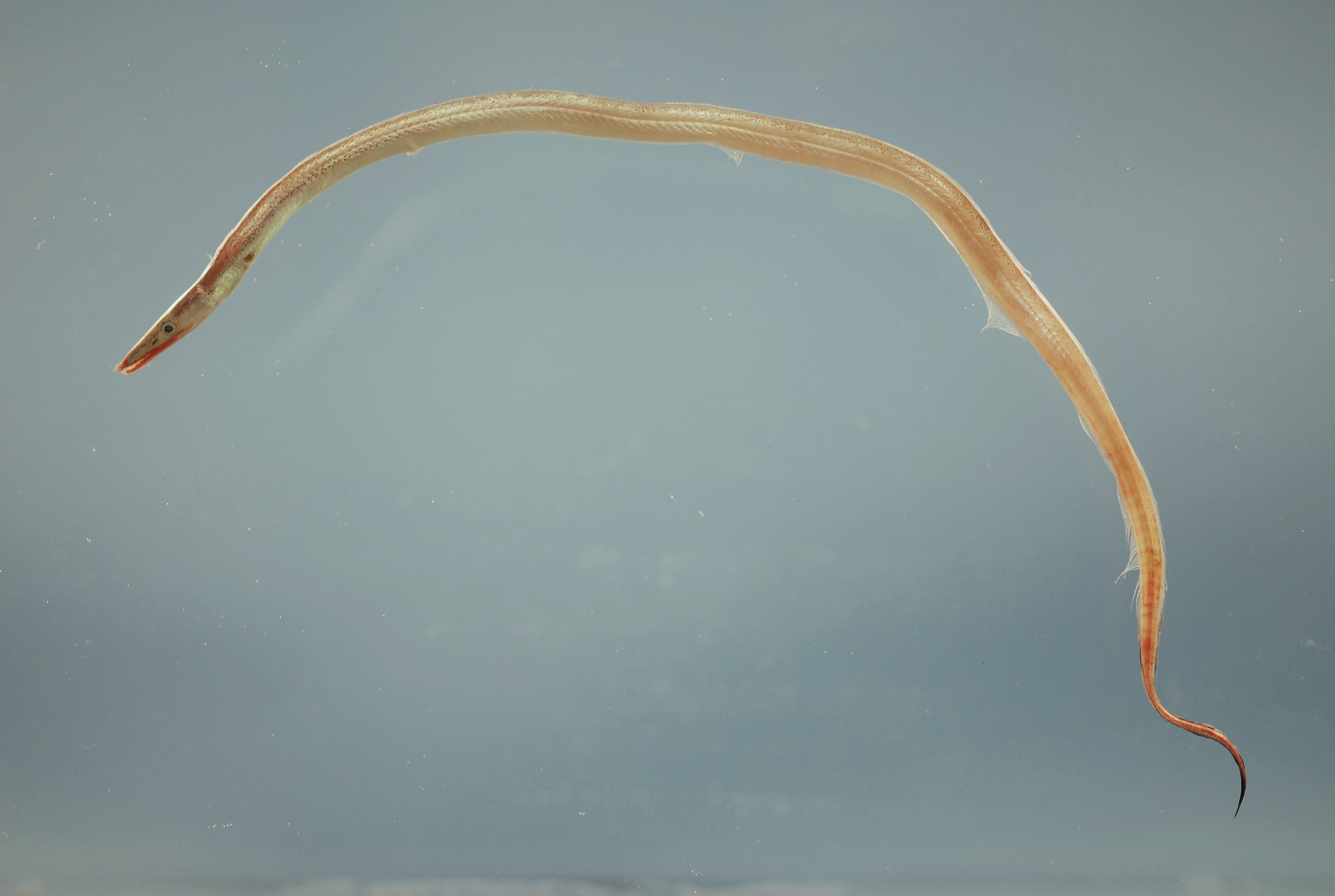

Scientific classification
- Kingdom: Animalia
- Phylum: Chordata
- Class: Actinopterygii
- Order: Anguilliformes
- Family: Nettastomatidae
- Genus: Hoplunnis
- Species: H. macrura

Binomial name
- Hoplunnis macrura Ginsburg, 1951

Synonyms
- Hoplunnis macrurus Ginsburg, 1951

= Freckled pike-conger =

Species of fish

The freckled pike-conger (Hoplunnis macrura), also known as the silver conger, is an eel in the family Nettastomatidae (duckbill/witch eels). It was described by Isaac Ginsburg in 1951. It is a marine, subtropical eel which is known from the western central Atlantic Ocean, including the Gulf of Mexico, Colombia, and towards the mouth of the Amazon River. It dwells at a depth range of 55–310 meters. Males can reach a maximum total length of 54.2 centimeters.

== Diet ==
Silver congers eat small marine fish and benthic invertebrates, such as shrimp and crabs.

== Habitat and Distribution ==
Hoplunnis macrura tends to live in deeper waters in subtropical environments. These congers are non-burrowing organisms, nor do they live in wholes or cracks on sea floors or walls. They live in areas where the sea floor is soft. They are often found here the sea floor is soft. Adult silver congers are known to inhabit the Gulf of Mexico, western Atlantic, along the South American coast, and the Caribbean Sea.

Distribution among previously stated regions:

Western Atlantic – along the east coast of the United States

Gulf of Mexico - from Florida Keys to Campeche, Mexico

Caribbean Sea - the Honduran/Nicaraguan border

South America - From Columbia to the mouth of the Amazon River off of Brazil

Silver Conger larvae have been collected off the coast of Barbados, North Carolina, and the Scotian Shelf.

== Reproduction and Life Cycle ==
Silver conger eggs are pelagic. They float in the water column in order to be fertilized and develop.

== Morphology ==
Silver congers are slender-bodied and have a light yellowish- brown appearance with tiny spots on their dorsal side and black accents on their vertical fins. They have overhanging jaws with which teeth of different sizes are visible when the mouth is closed. There is an inner and outer row of teeth in their mouths. The teeth of the bottom row tend to be larger than those on top. They have a lateral line with 32-37 lateral line pores before the anus.

== Importance to Humans ==
There is no known importance of silver congers to humans. They are harmless, not traded, and not used by humans.
