= Nettenchelys bellottii =

Conservation status
- Data Deficient (IUCN 3.1)

Scientific classification
- Kingdom: Animalia
- Phylum: Chordata
- Class: Actinopterygii
- Order: Anguilliformes
- Family: Nettastomatidae
- Genus: Nettenchelys
- Species: N. bellottii

Binomial name
- Nettenchelys bellottii (D'Ancona, 1928)

Synonyms
- Leptocephalus bellottii D'Ancona, 1928

Species of fish

Nettenchelys bellottii is a species of duckbill eel in the family Nettastomatidae. It is found in the western Indian Ocean and the Red Sea. This species is only known from larvae.
