= Slender duckbill eel =

Scientific classification
- Kingdom: Animalia
- Phylum: Chordata
- Class: Actinopterygii
- Order: Anguilliformes
- Family: Nettastomatidae
- Genus: Hoplunnis
- Species: H. punctata

Binomial name
- Hoplunnis punctata Regan, 1915

Synonyms
- Hoplunnis punctatus Regan, 1915

Species of fish

The slender duckbill eel (Hoplunnis punctata) is an eel in the family Nettastomatidae (duckbill/witch eels). It was described by Charles Tate Regan in 1915. It is a marine, deep water-dwelling eel which is known from the Gulf of Guinea, in the eastern Atlantic Ocean. It inhabits the continental shelf and slope. Males can reach a maximum total length of 55.5 centimetres (21.9 in).
