= Venefica multiporosa =

Conservation status
- Least Concern (IUCN 3.1)

Scientific classification
- Kingdom: Animalia
- Phylum: Chordata
- Class: Actinopterygii
- Order: Anguilliformes
- Family: Nettastomatidae
- Genus: Venefica
- Species: V. multiporosa

Binomial name
- Venefica multiporosa Karrer, 1983

Species of fish

Venefica multiporosa is a species of eel in the family Nettastomatidae (duckbill/witch eels). It was described by Christine Karrer in 1983. It is a marine, deep water-dwelling eel which is known from the Indo-western Pacific, including Madagascar, Australia and the Philippines. It dwells at a depth range of 416 to 1,300 metres (1,365 to 4,265 ft). Males can reach a maximum total length of 70 centimetres (28 in).
