= Hoplunnis megista =

Scientific classification
- Domain: Eukaryota
- Kingdom: Animalia
- Phylum: Chordata
- Class: Actinopterygii
- Order: Anguilliformes
- Family: Nettastomatidae
- Genus: Hoplunnis
- Species: H. megista

Binomial name
- Hoplunnis megista D. G. Smith & Kanazawa, 1989

Species of fish

Hoplunnis megista is an eel in the family Nettastomatidae (duckbill/witch eels). It was described by David G. Smith and Robert H. Kanazawa in 1989. It is a marine, deep water-dwelling eel which is known from the western central Atlantic Ocean, including Nicaragua and Panama. It is known to dwell at a depth range of 366 to 421 meters (1,201 to 1,381 ft). Males can reach a maximum total length of 91.7 centimeters (36.1 in).
