= Spotted pike-conger =

Scientific classification
- Kingdom: Animalia
- Phylum: Chordata
- Class: Actinopterygii
- Order: Anguilliformes
- Family: Nettastomatidae
- Genus: Hoplunnis
- Species: H. tenuis

Binomial name
- Hoplunnis tenuis Ginsburg, 1951

Species of fish

The spotted pike-conger (Hoplunnis tenuis), also known as the conger eel in Cuba, is an eel in the family Nettastomatidae (duckbill/witch eels). It was described by Isaac Ginsburg in 1951. It is a marine, deep water-dwelling eel which is known from the western Atlantic Ocean, including the Gulf of Mexico and the Straits of Florida, USA. It dwells at a depth range of 130 to 420 meters (430 to 1,380 ft), and inhabits benthic sediments of mud. Males can reach a maximum total length of 46 centimeters (18 in).
