= Venefica ocella =

Conservation status
- Least Concern (IUCN 3.1)

Scientific classification
- Kingdom: Animalia
- Phylum: Chordata
- Class: Actinopterygii
- Order: Anguilliformes
- Family: Nettastomatidae
- Genus: Venefica
- Species: V. ocella

Binomial name
- Venefica ocella Garman, 1899

Species of fish

Venefica ocella is an eel in the family Nettastomatidae (duckbill/witch eels). It was described by Samuel Garman in 1899. It is a marine, deep water-dwelling eel which is known from the eastern Pacific Ocean. It is known to dwell at a depth of 1,953 metres (6,407 ft).
