= Solitary duckbill eel =

Scientific classification
- Kingdom: Animalia
- Phylum: Chordata
- Class: Actinopterygii
- Order: Anguilliformes
- Family: Nettastomatidae
- Genus: Nettastoma
- Species: N. solitarium

Binomial name
- Nettastoma solitarium Castle & Smith, 1981

Species of fish

The solitary duckbill eel (Nettastoma solitarium) is an eel in the family Nettastomatidae (duckbill/witch eels). It was described by Peter H. J. Castle and David G. Smith in 1981. It is a marine, deep-water-dwelling eel which is known from the Indo-Western Pacific, including Kyushu–Palau Ridge, the Philippines, Australia, and the Hawaiian Islands. It is known to dwell at a depth range of 415 to 610 metres (1,362 to 2,001 ft). Males can reach a maximum total length of 46.5 centimetres (18.3 in).

The species epithet "solitarium", meaning "solitary" in Latin, refers to the species' wide and isolated distribution in the Pacific.
