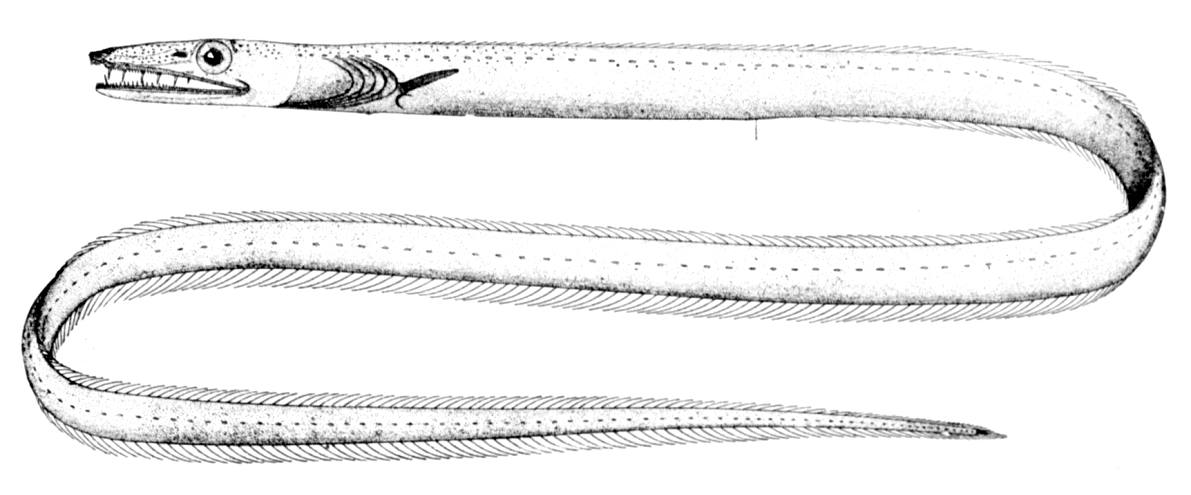

Scientific classification
- Kingdom: Animalia
- Phylum: Chordata
- Class: Actinopterygii
- Order: Anguilliformes
- Family: Nettastomatidae
- Genus: Hoplunnis
- Species: H. diomediana

Binomial name
- Hoplunnis diomediana Goode & Bean, 1896

Synonyms
- Hoplunnis diomedianus Goode & Bean, 1896

= Blacktail pike-conger =

Species of fish

The blacktail pike-conger (Hoplunnis diomediana) is an eel in the family Nettastomatidae (duckbill/witch eels). It was described by George Brown Goode and Tarleton Hoffman Bean in 1896. It is a subtropical, marine eel which is known from the western Atlantic Ocean. It is known to dwell at a maximum depth of 203 meters. Males can reach a maximum total length of 36.6 centimeters.
