= Nettenchelys dionisi =

Conservation status
- Data Deficient (IUCN 3.1)

Scientific classification
- Kingdom: Animalia
- Phylum: Chordata
- Class: Actinopterygii
- Order: Anguilliformes
- Family: Nettastomatidae
- Genus: Nettenchelys
- Species: N. dionisi

Binomial name
- Nettenchelys dionisi Brito, 1989

Species of fish

Nettenchelys dionisi is an eel in the family Nettastomatidae (duckbill/witch eels). It was described by Alberto Brito in 1989. It is a marine, deep water-dwelling eel which is known from the Canary Islands, in the eastern central Atlantic Ocean. It dwells at a depth range of 350 to 400 metres (1,150 to 1,310 ft), and leads a benthic lifestyle. Males can reach a maximum total length of 62 centimetres (24 in).

The species epithet, "dionisi" refers to Gustavo Perez-Dionis, and was given as a tribute for his contributions to the study of marine life in the Canary Islands.
