= Longface eel =

Scientific classification
- Domain: Eukaryota
- Kingdom: Animalia
- Phylum: Chordata
- Class: Actinopterygii
- Order: Anguilliformes
- Family: Nettastomatidae
- Genus: Saurenchelys
- Species: S. cognita

Binomial name
- Saurenchelys cognita Smith, 1989

Species of fish

The longface eel (Saurenchelys cognita) is an eel in the family Nettastomatidae (duckbill/witch eels). It was described by David G. Smith in 1989. It is a marine, tropical eel which is known from the western central Atlantic Ocean, including North Carolina and Florida, USA, the northwestern Gulf of Mexico, and Mobile Bay. It dwells at a depth range of 59 to 158 meters (194 to 518 ft). Males can reach a maximum total length of 36 centimeters (14 in).
