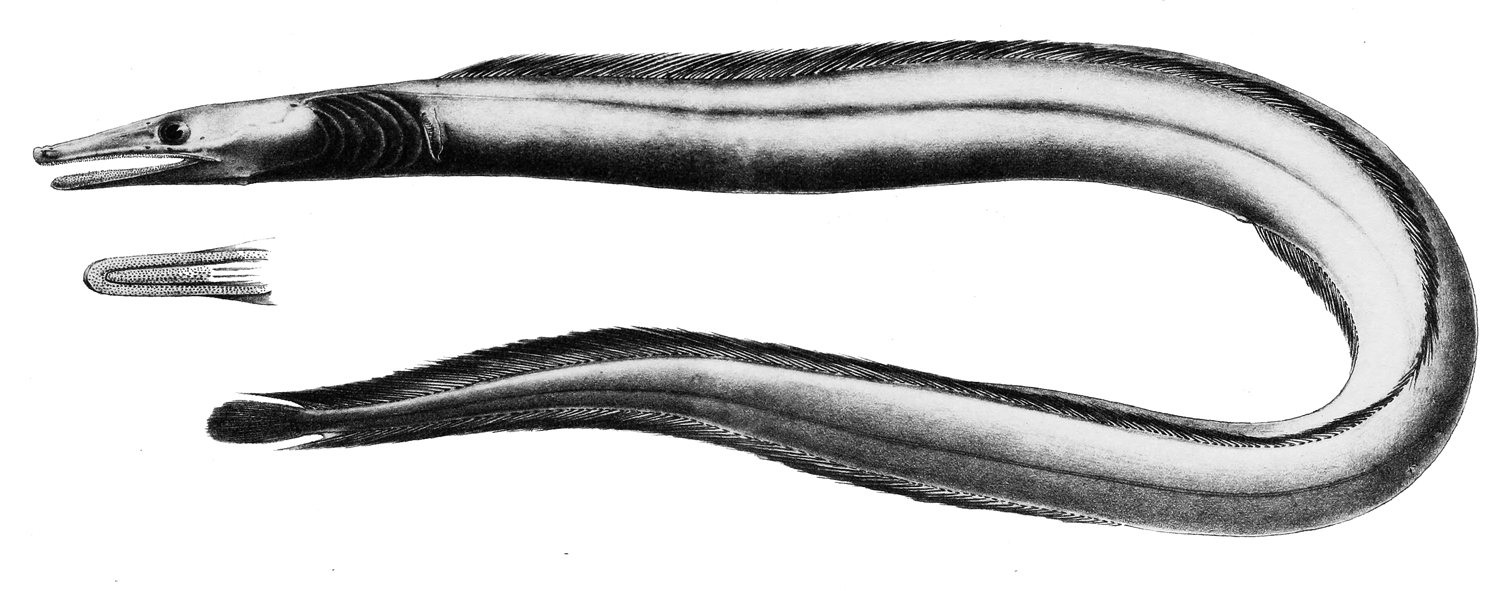

Conservation status
- Data Deficient (IUCN 3.1)

Scientific classification
- Kingdom: Animalia
- Phylum: Chordata
- Class: Actinopterygii
- Division: Teleostei
- Order: Anguilliformes
- Family: Nettastomatidae
- Genus: Nettenchelys
- Species: N. taylori

Binomial name
- Nettenchelys taylori Alcock, 1898

= Nettenchelys taylori =

Species of fish

Nettenchelys taylori is an eel in the family Nettastomatidae (duckbill/witch eels). It was described by Alfred William Alcock in 1898. It is a marine, deep-water dwelling eel which is known from a single specimen from India, in the western Indian Ocean. From the specimen it is known to dwell at a depth of 786 metres (2,579 ft), and to reach a total length of 53.3 centimetres (21.0 in).

== Etymology ==
The species epithet "taylori" refers to Commander A. Dundas Taylor of the Indian Navy, credited by the author as playing a notable role in the revival of the Marine Survey of India in 1874.
