= Nettenchelys erroriensis =

Conservation status
- Data Deficient (IUCN 3.1)

Scientific classification
- Kingdom: Animalia
- Phylum: Chordata
- Class: Actinopterygii
- Order: Anguilliformes
- Family: Nettastomatidae
- Genus: Nettenchelys
- Species: N. erroriensis

Binomial name
- Nettenchelys erroriensis Karmovskaya, 1994

Species of fish

Nettenchelys erroriensis is an eel in the family Nettastomatidae (duckbill/witch eels). It was described by Emma Stanislavovna Karmovskaya in 1994. It is a marine, deep water-dwelling eel which is known from Error Seamount (from which its species epithet is derived), in the western Indian Ocean. It dwells at a depth range of 395 to 420 metres (1,296 to 1,378 ft). Females can reach a maximum total length of 33.5 centimetres (13.2 in).
