= Whitsunday wire eel =

Scientific classification
- Kingdom: Animalia
- Phylum: Chordata
- Class: Actinopterygii
- Division: Teleostei
- Order: Anguilliformes
- Family: Nettastomatidae
- Genus: Saurenchelys
- Species: S. finitima

Binomial name
- Saurenchelys finitima (Whitley, 1935)

Synonyms
- Chlopsis finitimus Whitley, 1935

Species of fish

Saurenchelys finitima, also known as the Whitsunday wire eel, is a species of eel in the family Nettastomatidae. It was described by Gilbert Percy Whitley in 1935, originally under the genus Chlopsis. It is a marine, tropical eel which is endemic to Australia, in the western Pacific Ocean.
