= Nettenchelys inion =

Conservation status
- Least Concern (IUCN 3.1)

Scientific classification
- Kingdom: Animalia
- Phylum: Chordata
- Class: Actinopterygii
- Order: Anguilliformes
- Family: Nettastomatidae
- Genus: Nettenchelys
- Species: N. inion

Binomial name
- Nettenchelys inion Smith & Böhlke, 1981

Species of fish

Nettenchelys inion is an eel in the family Nettastomatidae (duckbill/witch eels). It was described by David G. Smith and James Erwin Böhlke in 1981. It is a marine, deep water-dwelling eel which is known from a single specimen discovered near North Bimini Marine Protected Area in 1964. It is known to dwell at a depth range of 458 to 531 meters (1,503 to 1,742 ft). Males can reach a total length of 42.3 centimeters (16.7 in).

The species epithet "inion" means "back of head" in Greek, and is treated as a noun in apposition. It refers to the location of the posterior nostril.
