= Pygmy pikeconger =

Conservation status
- Least Concern (IUCN 3.1)

Scientific classification
- Kingdom: Animalia
- Phylum: Chordata
- Class: Actinopterygii
- Order: Anguilliformes
- Family: Nettastomatidae
- Genus: Nettenchelys
- Species: N. pygmaea

Binomial name
- Nettenchelys pygmaea Smith & Böhlke, 1981

Synonyms
- Nettenchelys pygmaeus Smith & Böhlke, 1981

Species of fish

The pygmy pikeconger or pygmy duckbill eel, (Nettenchelys pygmaea) is an eel in the family Nettastomatidae (duckbill/witch eels). It was described by David G. Smith and James Erwin Böhlke in 1981. It is a marine, tropical eel which is known from the western central Atlantic Ocean, including Venezuela and the Gulf of Mexico, and possibly more locations. It is known to dwell at a depth range of 128 to 280 meters (420 to 919 ft). Males can reach a maximum total length of 20.1 centimeters (7.9 in).

The species epithet "pygmaea", meaning "small" in Greek, refers to the small size of mature specimens.
