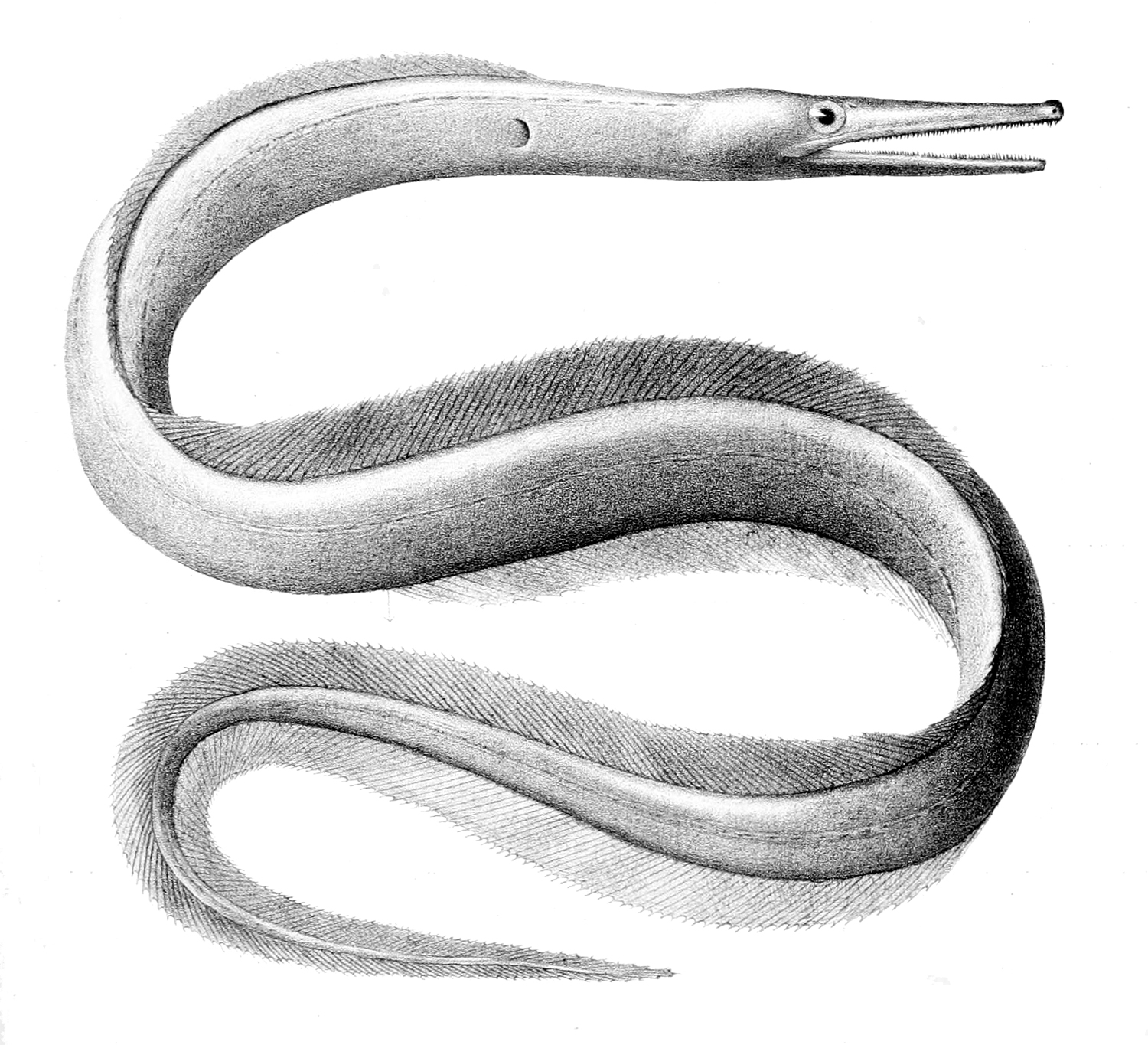

Scientific classification
- Kingdom: Animalia
- Phylum: Chordata
- Class: Actinopterygii
- Order: Anguilliformes
- Family: Nettastomatidae
- Genus: Nettastoma
- Species: N. melanurum

Binomial name
- Nettastoma melanurum Rafinesque, 1810
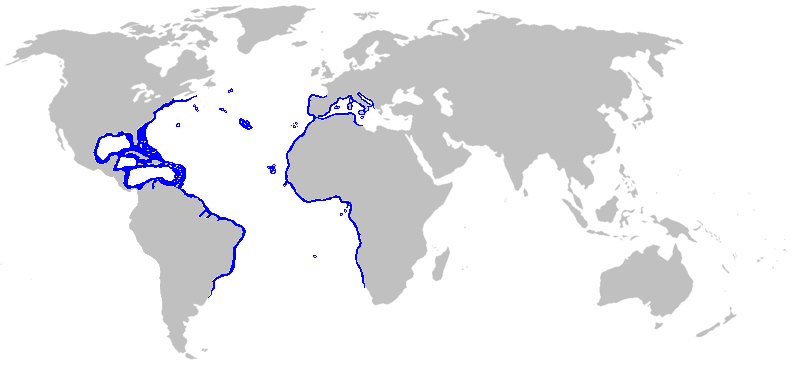
- Range (in blue)

Synonyms
- Leptocephalus longirostris Leptocephalus urosema

= Blackfin sorcerer =

Species of fish

The blackfin sorcerer (Nettastoma melanurum) is a species of saltwater eel in the family Nettastomatidae of the order Anguilliformes. It is found only in the Atlantic Ocean and the Mediterranean Sea.

== Distribution ==
Blackfin sorcerer eels live in the coastal waters of the Atlantic Ocean and also in the western Mediterranean Sea. They are more concentrated in the waters surrounding the Caribbean, the Azores, the Canary Islands and the northern Mediterranean Sea. It is found from depths of 37 m down to 1647 m.

== Appearance ==
The blackfin sorcerer are usually 50–60 centimetres (1.6–2.0 ft) in length when fully grown though the largest specimen was a male who was 73 centimetres (2.40 ft) in length. They are similar in appearance to other members of the family Nettastomatidae, with the trademark duck-bill-shaped mouth. They are brown in color, and as the name suggests, a black dorsal fin runs from just behind the head all the way to the tail, also adults lack a pectoral fin. The mouth is black in color and is considered large relative to the body size.

== Habitat and ecology ==
The blackfin sorcerer is known to live in holes on the bottoms of continental slopes. Its natural predators include cod-like fish such as the European Hake, whilst its prey include small crustaceans and small fish. Its small size and location at the bottom of continental slopes make it of no danger to humans and is also of no use to fisheries due to the abundance of other eels which are easier to locate and catch.
