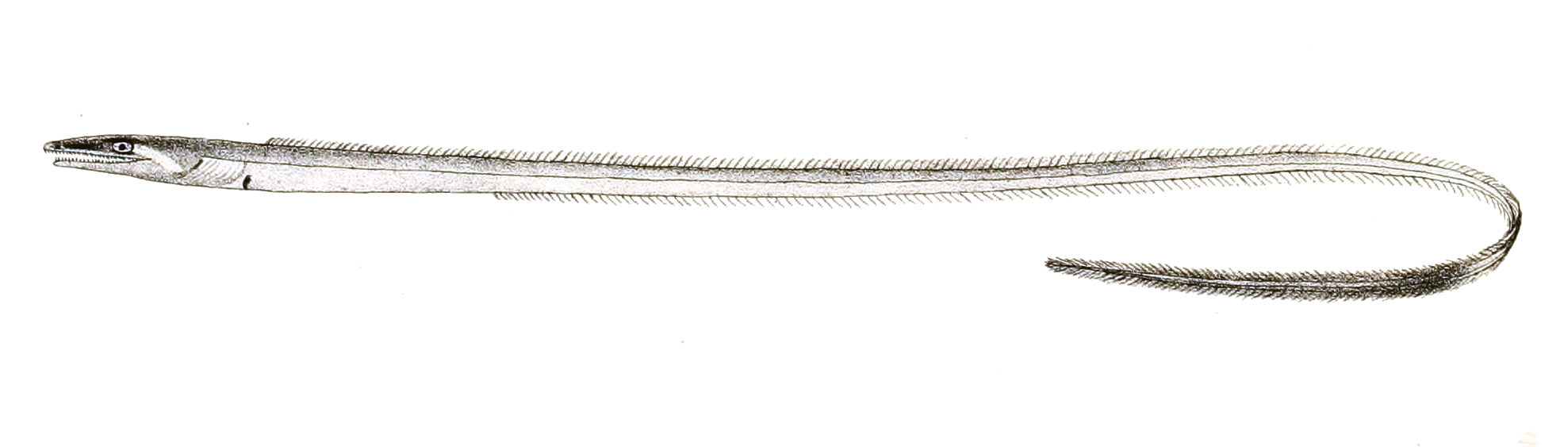
- Saurenchelys petersi

Scientific classification
- Kingdom: Animalia
- Phylum: Chordata
- Class: Actinopterygii
- Order: Anguilliformes
- Family: Nettastomatidae
- Genus: Saurenchelys; W. K. H. Peters, 1864

Type species
- Saurenchelys cancrivora W. K. H. Peters, 1864

= Saurenchelys =

Genus of fishes

Saurenchelys is a genus of eels in the duckbill eel family Nettastomatidae.

== Species ==
There are currently 11 recognized species in this genus:

- Saurenchelys cancrivora W. K. H. Peters, 1864 (slender sorcerer)
- Saurenchelys cognita D. G. Smith, 1989 (long-face wire eel)
- Saurenchelys elongata (Kotthaus, 1968)
- Saurenchelys fierasfer (D. S. Jordan & Snyder, 1901) (black-tail duckbill eel)
- Saurenchelys finitima (Whitley, 1935) (Whitsunday wire eel)
- Saurenchelys gigas J. Lin, D. G. Smith & K. T. Shao, 2015 (giant duckbill eel)
- Saurenchelys lateromaculata (D'Ancona, 1928)
- Saurenchelys meteori Klausewitz & Zajonz, 2000
- Saurenchelys petersi F. Day, 1878
- Saurenchelys stylura (E. H. M. Lea, 1913) (pillar wire eel)
- Saurenchelys taiwanensis Karmovskaya, 2004
