= Slender sorcerer =

Scientific classification
- Domain: Eukaryota
- Kingdom: Animalia
- Phylum: Chordata
- Class: Actinopterygii
- Order: Anguilliformes
- Family: Nettastomatidae
- Genus: Saurenchelys
- Species: S. cancrivora

Binomial name
- Saurenchelys cancrivora Peters, 1864

Synonyms
- Nettastoma elongatum Kotthaus, 1968

Species of fish

The slender sorcerer (Saurenchelys cancrivora) is an eel in the family Nettastomatidae (duckbill/witch eels). It was described by Wilhelm Peters in 1864. It is a marine, tropical eel which is known from the eastern Atlantic and Indian Ocean, including the River Congo and the Mediterranean. It dwells at a depth range of 185 to 700 metres (607 to 2,297 ft). Males can reach a maximum total length of 65 centimetres (26 in).
