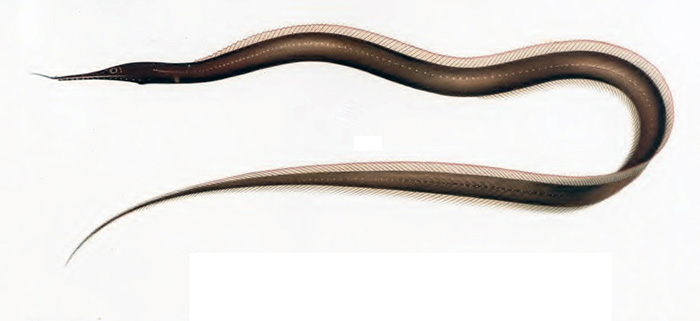

Conservation status
- Least Concern (IUCN 3.1)

Scientific classification
- Kingdom: Animalia
- Phylum: Chordata
- Class: Actinopterygii
- Order: Anguilliformes
- Family: Nettastomatidae
- Genus: Venefica
- Species: V. tentaculata

Binomial name
- Venefica tentaculata Garman, 1899

= Venefica tentaculata =

Species of fish

Venefica tentaculata is an eel in the family Nettastomatidae (duckbill/witch eels). It was described by Samuel Garman in 1899. It is a marine, subtropical eel which is known from the eastern central and northwestern Pacific Ocean, including Mexico, Nicaragua, Japan, and the United States. It dwells at a depth range of 100 to 500 metres (330 to 1,640 ft; 3,900 to 19,700 in), but may dive even deeper. Males can reach a maximum total length of 90 centimetres (35 in).

Due to the relatively wide distribution of this species, and the estimated unlikelihood of major threats, due to its deep water habitat, the IUCN redlist currently lists V. tentaculata as Least Concern.
