= Hoplunnis =

Scientific classification
- Domain: Eukaryota
- Kingdom: Animalia
- Phylum: Chordata
- Class: Actinopterygii
- Order: Anguilliformes
- Family: Nettastomatidae
- Genus: Hoplunnis; Kaup, 1860

Type species
- Hoplunnis schmidti Kaup, 1859

Species
- See text.

Genus of fishes

Hoplunnis is a genus of eels in the duckbill eel family Nettastomatidae. It currently contains the following species:

- Hoplunnis diomediana Goode & T. H. Bean, 1896 (Blacktail pike-conger)
- Hoplunnis macrura Ginsburg, 1951 (Freckled pike-conger)
- Hoplunnis megista D. G. Smith & Kanazawa, 1989
- Hoplunnis pacifica Lane & K. W. Stewart, 1968 (Silver pikeconger)
- Hoplunnis punctata Regan, 1915 (Slender duckbill eel)
- Hoplunnis schmidti Kaup, 1860
- Hoplunnis sicarius (Garman, 1899)
- Hoplunnis similis D. G. Smith, 1989
- Hoplunnis tenuis Ginsburg, 1951 (Spotted pike-conger)
