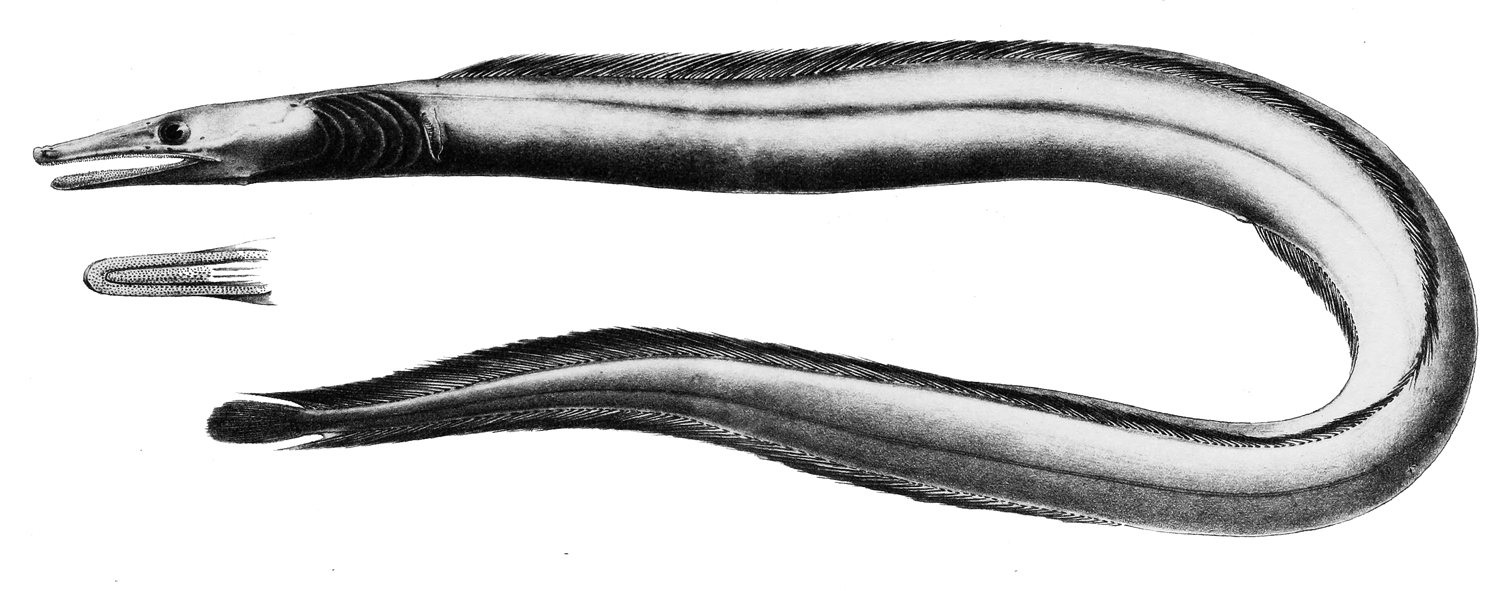
- Nettenchelys taylori

Scientific classification
- Kingdom: Animalia
- Phylum: Chordata
- Class: Actinopterygii
- Order: Anguilliformes
- Family: Nettastomatidae
- Genus: Nettenchelys; Alcock, 1898

Type species
- Nettenchelys taylori Alcock, 1898

= Nettenchelys =

Genus of fishes

Nettenchelys is a genus of eels in the duckbill eel family Nettastomatidae.

== Species ==
There are currently 10 recognized species in this genus:

- Nettenchelys bellottii (D'Ancona, 1928)
- Nettenchelys dionisi Brito, 1989
- Nettenchelys erroriensis Karmovskaya, 1994
- Nettenchelys exoria J. E. Böhlke & D. G. Smith, 1981
- Nettenchelys gephyra Castle & D. G. Smith, 1981 (Bridge duckbill eel)
- Nettenchelys inion D. G. Smith & J. E. Böhlke, 1981
- Nettenchelys paxtoni Karmovskaya, 1999
- Nettenchelys proxima D. G. Smith, J. Lin & H. M. Chen, 2015
- Nettenchelys pygmaea D. G. Smith & J. E. Böhlke, 1981 (Pygmy duckbill eel)
- Nettenchelys taylori Alcock, 1898
