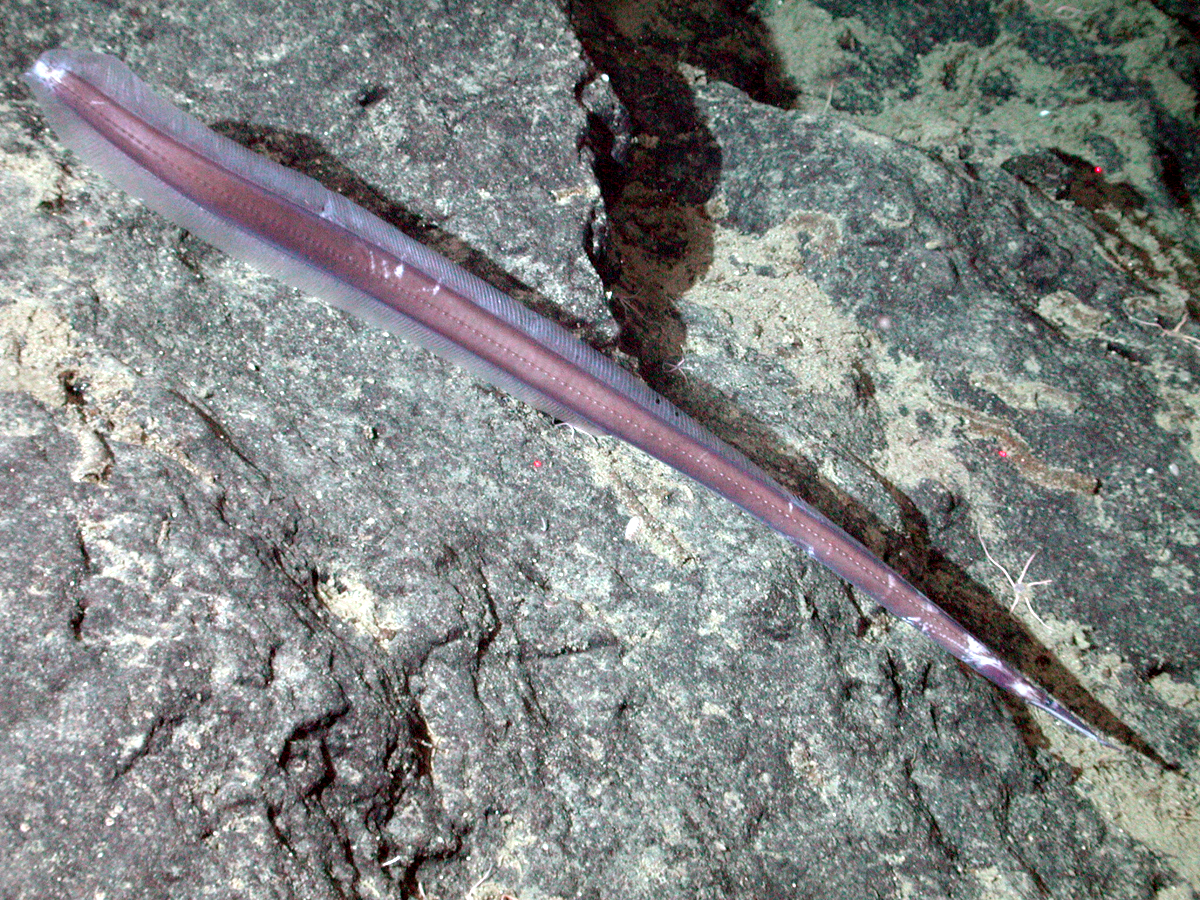
- Venefica tentaculata

Scientific classification
- Domain: Eukaryota
- Kingdom: Animalia
- Phylum: Chordata
- Class: Actinopterygii
- Order: Anguilliformes
- Family: Nettastomatidae
- Genus: Venefica; D. S. Jordan & B. M. Davis, 1891

Type species
- Nettastoma procerum Goode & T. H. Bean, 1883

Species
- See text.

= Venefica =

Genus of fishes

Venefica is a genus of eels in the duckbill eel family Nettastomatidae. It currently contains the following species:

- Venefica multiporosa Karrer, 1982
- Venefica ocella Garman, 1899
- Venefica proboscidea (Vaillant, 1888) (Whipsnout sorcerer)
- Venefica procera (Goode & T. H. Bean, 1883)
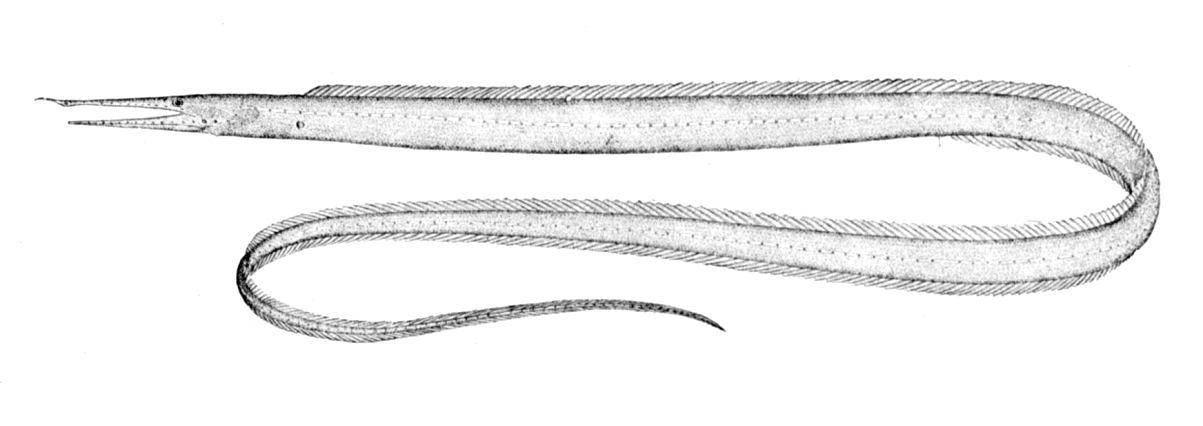
  Venefica procera
- Venefica tentaculata Garman, 1899
