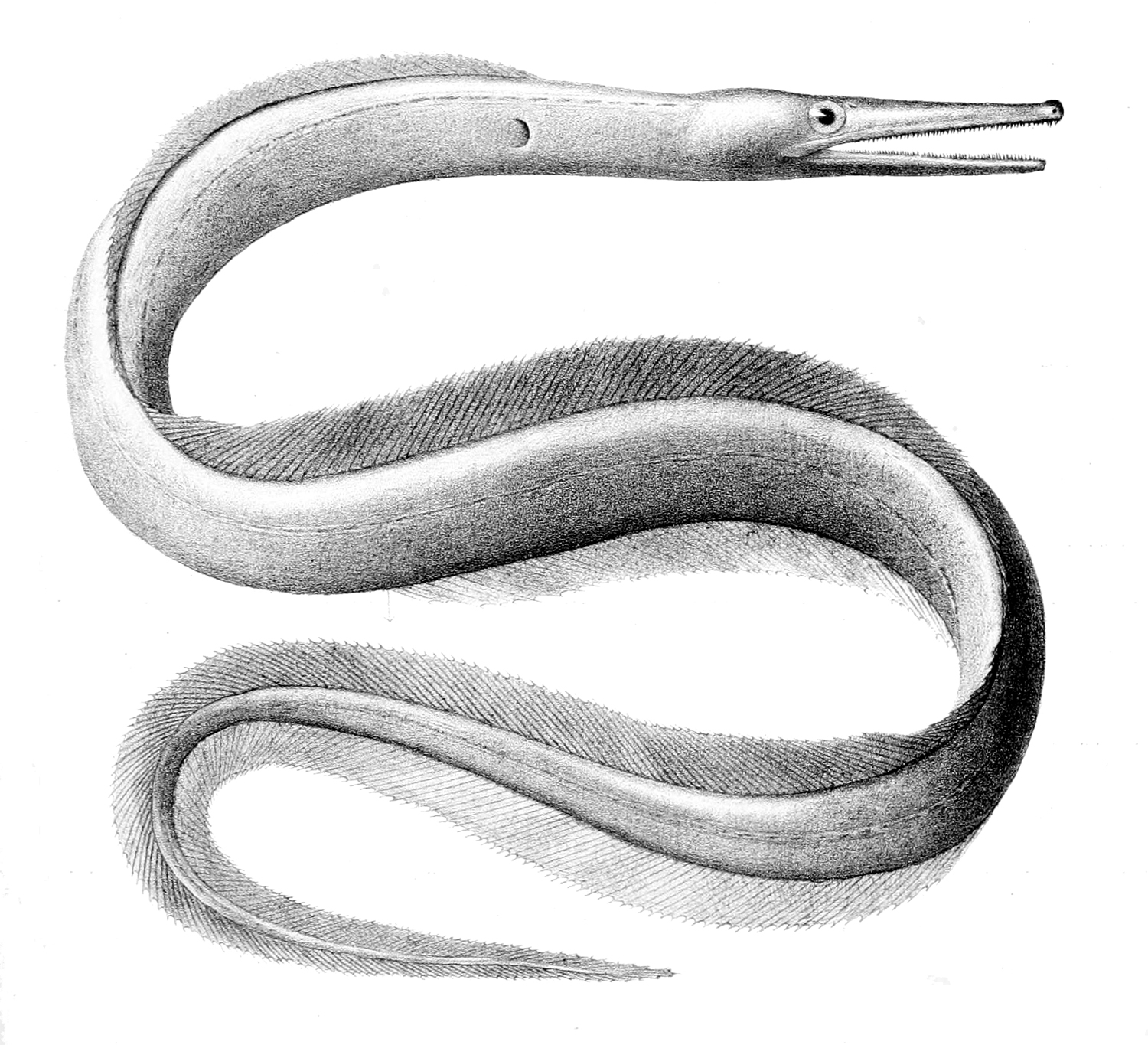

Scientific classification
- Kingdom: Animalia
- Phylum: Chordata
- Class: Actinopterygii
- Order: Anguilliformes
- Family: Nettastomatidae
- Genus: Nettastoma; Rafinesque, 1810

Type species
- Nettastoma melanura Rafinesque, 1810

Species
- See text.

= Nettastoma =

Genus of fishes

Nettastoma, from Ancient Greek νῆττα (nêtta), meaning "duck", and στόμα (stóma), meaning "mouth", is a genus of eels in the duckbill eel family Nettastomatidae.

== Species ==
There are currently five recognized species in this genus:

- Nettastoma falcinaris Parin & Karmovskaya, 1985
- Nettastoma melanurum Rafinesque, 1810 (Blackfin sorcerer)
- Nettastoma parviceps Günther, 1877 (Duck-billed eel) (syn. N. denticulatus)
- Nettastoma solitarium Castle & D. G. Smith, 1981 (Solitary duck-billed eel)
- Nettastoma syntresis D. G. Smith & J. E. Böhlke, 1981

=== Formerly Included Species ===
- Nettastoma elongatum Kotthaus, 1968 (slender sorcerer) - valid as Saurenchelys cancrivora
