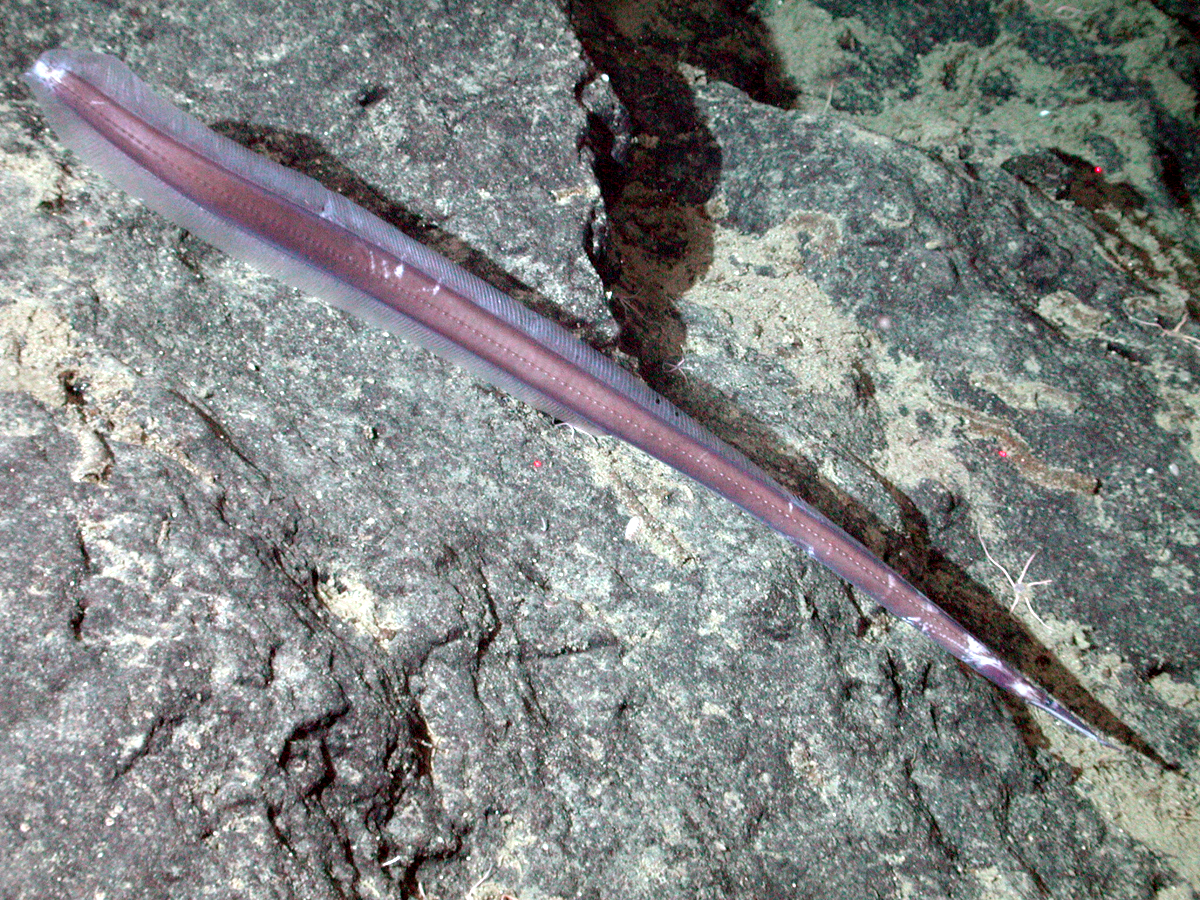
- Venefica tentaculata

Scientific classification
- Kingdom: Animalia
- Phylum: Chordata
- Class: Actinopterygii
- Order: Anguilliformes
- Suborder: Congroidei
- Family: Nettastomatidae; Kaup, 1859

Genera
- see text

= Nettastomatidae =

Family of fishes

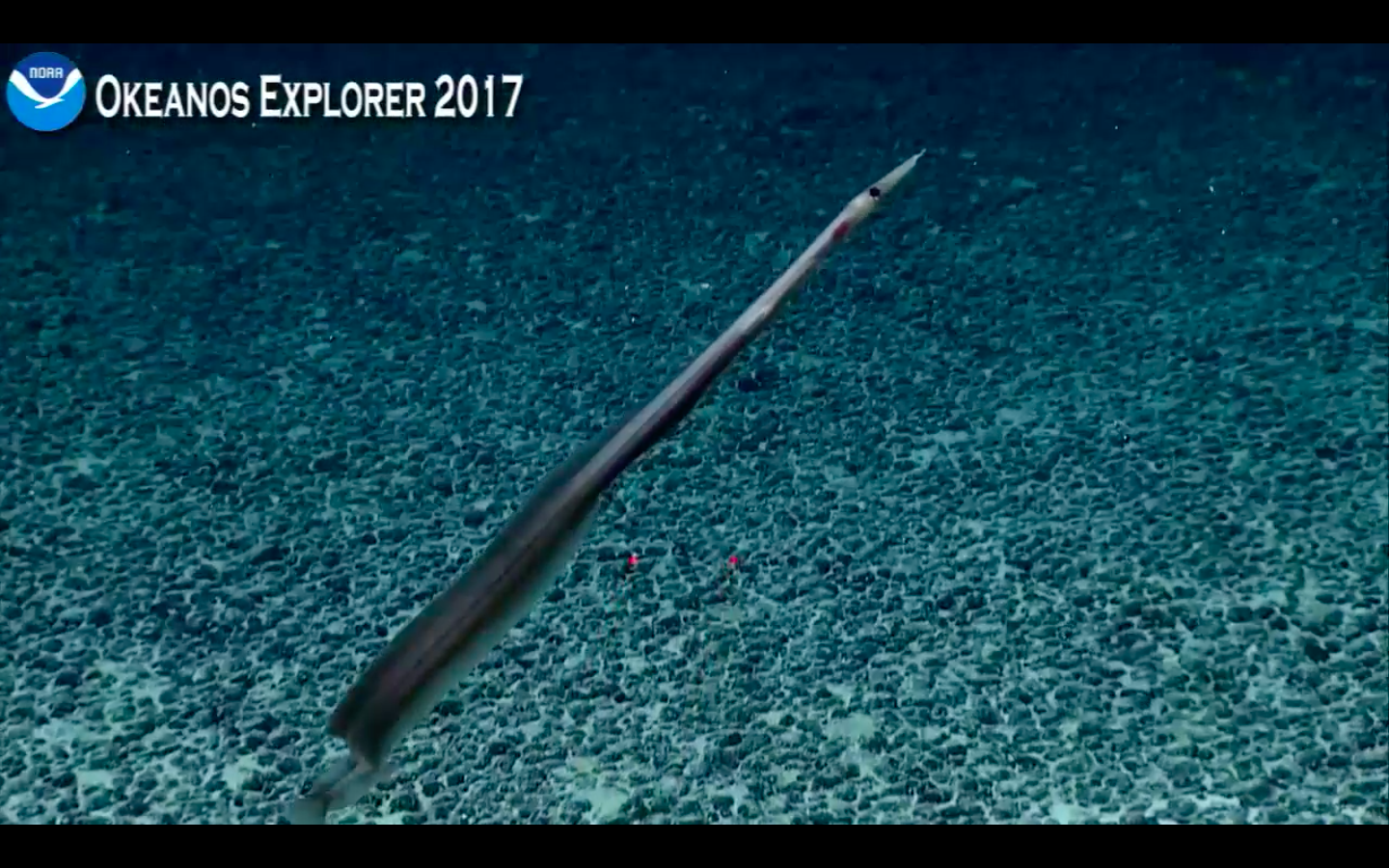
Duckbill eel from 2017 NOAA Okeanos expedition at a depth of 2,600m (8530ft)

Nettastomatidae, from Ancient Greek νῆττα (nêtta), meaning "duck", and στόμα (stóma), meaning "mouth", are a family of eels known as the duckbill eels or witch eels.

Duckbill eels are found along the continental slopes of tropical and temperate oceans worldwide. They are bottom-dwelling fish, feeding on invertebrates and smaller fish. They are slender eels, up to 125 centimetres (4.10 ft) in length, with narrow heads and large, toothy, mouths. Most species lack pectoral fins.

== Genera ==
Nettastomatidae contains the following genera:

- Facciolella Whitley, 1938
- Hoplunnis Kaup, 1859
- Nettastoma Rafinesque, 1810
- Nettenchelys Alcock, 1898
- Saurenchelys Peters, 1864
- Venefica D. S. Jordan & Davis, 1891
