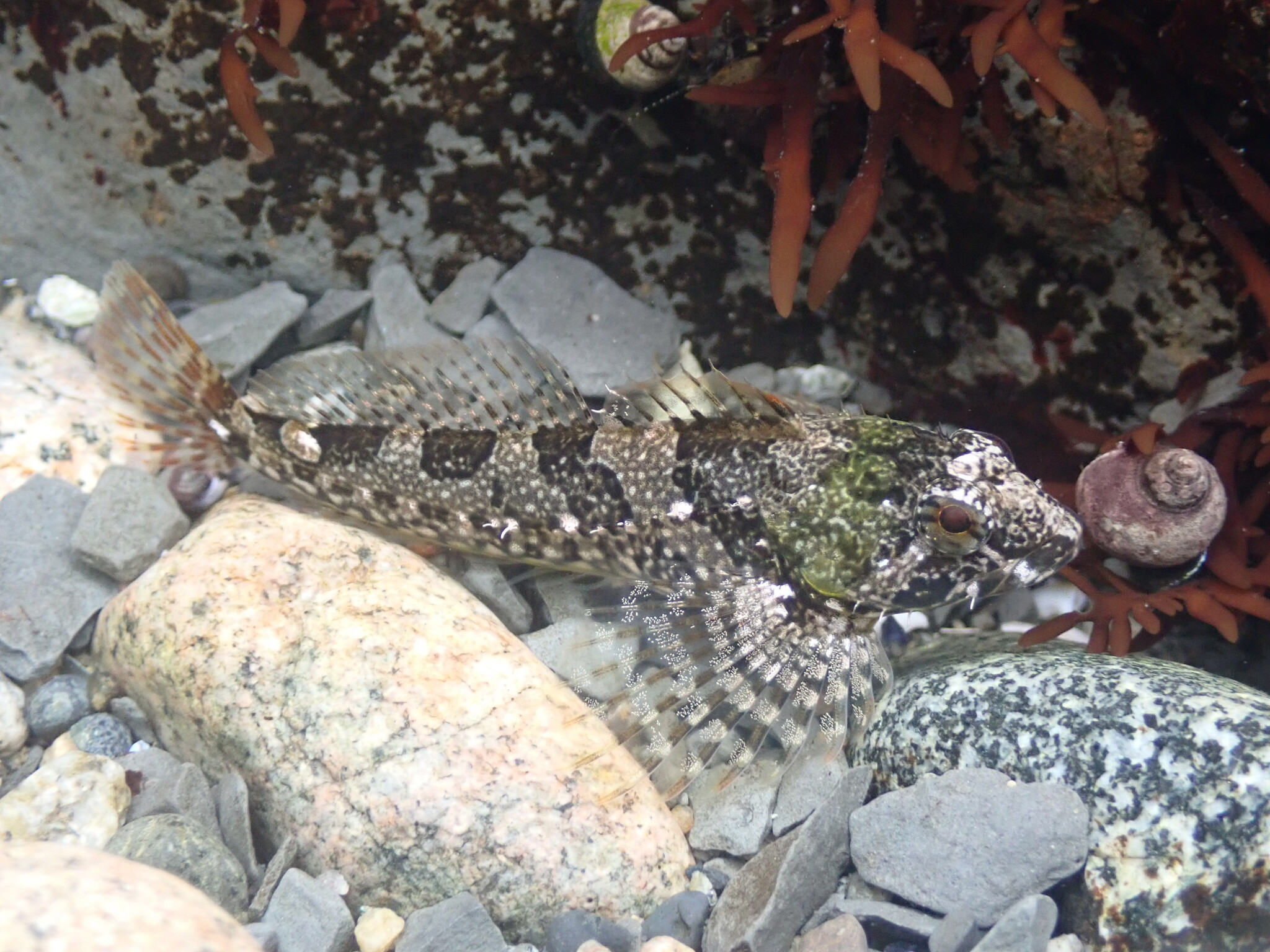
- Tidepool sculpin (Oligocottus maculosus), a typical member of the family
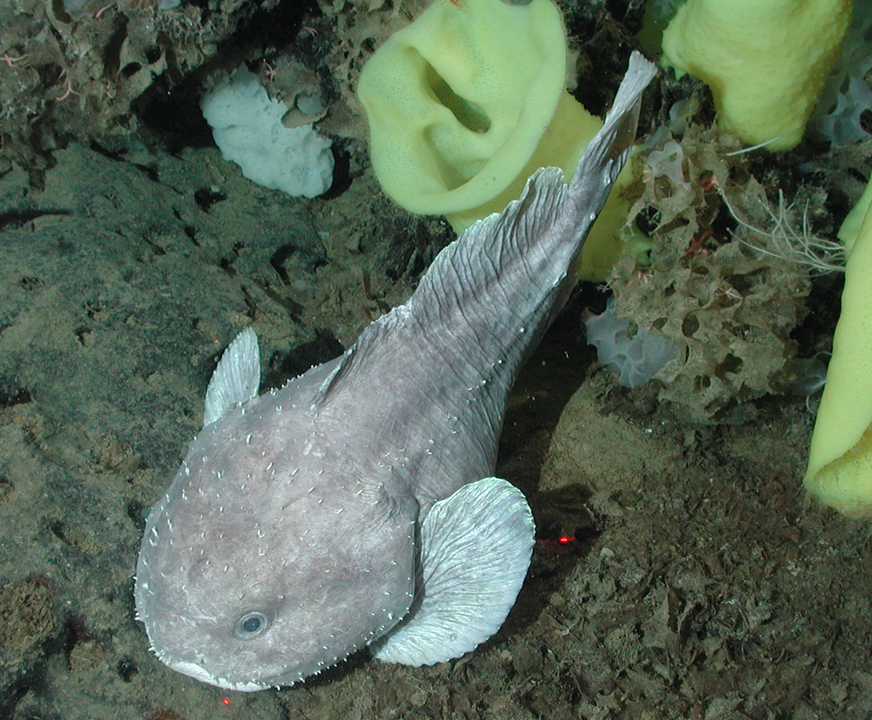
- Blob sculpin (Psychrolutes phrictus), a deep-sea member of the family in its natural state

Scientific classification
- Kingdom: Animalia
- Phylum: Chordata
- Class: Actinopterygii
- Division: Teleostei
- Order: Perciformes
- Suborder: Cottoidei
- Superfamily: Cottoidea
- Family: Psychrolutidae; T. N. Gill, 1861

Genera
- see text

Synonyms
- Bathylutichthyidae Balushkin & Voskoboynikova, 1990

= Psychrolutidae =

Psychrolutidae Temporal range: Early Eocene–present

Family of fishes

Psychrolutidae (commonly known as marine sculpins, flathead sculpins, blobfishes, or tadpole sculpins) is a family of sculpins found in cool temperate waters throughout the Northern Hemisphere, with a few species ranging into cold and deep waters of the Southern Hemisphere. The vast majority are found in marine habitats, but a few range into freshwater habitats. The family reaches its greatest diversity in the North Pacific Ocean, but a few species are found as far south as Antarctica. The family contains over 216 recognized species in 63 genera. Their name is derived from the Greek psychrolouteo, meaning "to have a cold bath".

== Taxonomy ==
In the past, this family was restricted to just a few genera (most famously the blobfish of Psychrolutes) restricted to deep or cool temperate habitats, with a tadpole-like body plan with large heads and bodies that taper back into small, flat tails. Other, more typical-looking marine sculpins were placed in the family Cottidae, which also contains freshwater sculpins like Cottus. However, phylogenetic evidence has found this classification to be paraphyletic: almost all marine sculpins are more closely related to the blobfish than they are to freshwater sculpins. This necessitated the restriction of Cottidae to only genera closely related to Cottus, while almost all other marine sculpins were moved into Psychrolutidae.

Fossil otoliths reminiscent of Enophrys are known from the Early Eocene of England, although skeletal fossil remains definitively assignable to this family only appear during the Miocene.

=== Genera ===
The Catalog of Fishes classifies the family as follows:

- Family Psychrolutidae Günther, 1861
  - Alcichthys Jordan & Starks, 1904
  - Ambophthalmos Jackson & Nelson, 1998
  - Andriashevicottus Fedorov, 1990
  - Antipodocottus Bolin, 1952
  - Archistes Jordan & Gilbert, 1898
  - Argyrocottus Herzenstein, 1892
  - Artediellichthys Fedorov, 1973
  - Artediellina Taranetz 1941
  - Artedielloides Soldatov, 1922
  - Artediellus Jordan, 1885
  - Artedius Girard, 1856
  - Ascelichthys Jordan & Gilbert, 1880
  - Asemichthys Gilbert, 1912
  - Astrocottus Bolin, 1936
  - Atopocottus Bolin, 1936
  - Bathylutichthys Balushkin & Voskoboinikova, 1990
  - Bero Jordan & Starks, 1904
  - Bolinia Yabe, 1991
  - Chitonotus Lockington, 1879
  - Clinocottus Gill, 1861
  - Cottiusculus Jordan & Starks, 1904
  - Cottunculus Collett, 1875
  - Daruma Jordan & Starks, 1904
  - Dasycottus T.H. Bean, 1890
  - Ebinania Sakamoto, 1932
  - Enophrys Swainson, 1839
  - Eurymen Gilbert & Burke, 1912
  - Furcina Jordan & Starks, 1904
  - Gymnocanthus Swainson, 1839
  - Icelinus Jordan, 1885
  - Icelus Krøyer, 1845
  - Leiocottus Girard, 1856
  - Lepidobero K. J. Qin & X. B. Jin, 1992
  - Malacocottus T.H. Bean, 1890
  - Megalocottus Gill, 1861
  - Micrenophrys Andriashev, 1954
  - Microcottus Schmidt, 1940
  - Myoxocephalus Tilesius, 1811
  - Neophrynichthys Günther, 1876
  - Ocynectes Jordan & Starks, 1904
  - Oligocottus Girard 1856
  - Orthonopias Starks & Mann, 1911
  - Phallocottus Schultz, 1938
  - Phasmatocottus Bolin, 1936
  - Porocottus Gill, 1859
  - Pseudoblennius Temminck & Schlegel, 1850
  - Psychrolutes Günther, 1861 (=Gilbertidia Berg, 1898)
  - Radulinopsis Soldatov & Lindberg, 1930
  - Radulinus Gilbert, 1890
  - Rastrinus Jordan & Evermann, 1896
  - Ricuzenius Jordan & Starks, 1904
  - Ruscarius Jordan & Starks, 1895
  - Sigmistes Rutter, 1898
  - Stelgistrum Jordan & Gilbert, 1898
  - Stlengis Jordan & Starks, 1904
  - Synchirus T.H. Bean, 1890
  - Taurocottus Soldatov & Pavlenko, 1915
  - Taurulus Gratzianov, 1907
  - Thyriscus Gilbert & Burke, 1912
  - Trichocottus Soldatov & Pavlenko, 1915
  - Triglops Reinhardt, 1830
  - Vellitor Jordan & Starks, 1904
  - Zesticelus Jordan & Evermann, 1896

== Description ==
Among "tadpole-shaped" members of this family, the skin is loosely attached and movable, and the layer underneath it is gelatinous. The eyes are placed high on the head, focused forward closer to the tip of the snout. Members of the family generally have large, leaf-like pectoral fins and lack scales, although some species are covered with soft spines. This is important to deep-dwelling members of the family, as the depths in which they live are highly pressurized and they are ambush/opportunistic/foraging predators that do not expend energy unless they are forced to.

The blobfish has a short, broad tongue and conical teeth that are slightly recurved and are arranged in bands in irregular rows along the premaxillaries; canines are completely absent. Teeth are nonexistent on the palatines and vomer; which make up the hard palate. The blobfish also has a set of specialized pharyngeal teeth that are well developed and paired evenly along the upper and lower portions of the pharyngeal arch. These specialized teeth may aid in the breakdown of food due to the very strategic dependency on whatever food falls from above.

The blobfish above water has a dark pink/black look to it, and it expands into a almost spherical shape due to the low pressure above water.

== Life history ==
They are found in the Atlantic and Pacific Ocean. Psychrolutes phrictus have been reported near the Mexican Pacific coast, which extends the southern range by 1,733 km (1,077 mi). Myoxocephalus thompsonii, deepwater sculpin, have even been reported in Lake Ontario which were once thought to be extirpated. Psychrolutidae species tend to habituate the northern most region of the Pacific ocean due to lower temperatures, and Indian Oceans. They are found in depths ranging from 300–1,700 meters (980–5,580 ft). The adults live on the sea floor, between 100 and 2,800 m (330 and 9,190 ft) deep. The intense biological pressure to conserve energy within deep sea fish seems to be true across many species; most of them are long lived, have a slow rate of reproduction, growth, and aging. Furthermore, studies have shown that the Psychrolutidae species displays a wide range of reproductive patterns, which include group synchronous maturation and extended batch spawning, which highlights their adjustment to deep sea habitats. In this case the blobfish can live to be roughly 130 years old. Categorized as the predator of the deep sea they have no real predatory issues; a big help to aid in their energy saving. Their diet also helps in their energy saving abilities. They feed on small crustaceans, sea pens, sea worms, and any other small organisms that swim right in front of them. They tend to live in colder waters, although some range into warm-temperate seas.

The blob sculpin, Psychrolutes phrictus, exhibits complex nesting behaviors complete with egg guarding. Reproductively the blobfish have been seen gathering in large numbers to lay their pinkish eggs in a single surrounding nesting area. The number of eggs laid within one nest can range from 9,000 to 108,000. Another observation of the parental care of the blobfish is that their eggs resemble being cleaned. It is believed that as the female blobfish hover around the nests they also clean them and remove any sand or dirt.
