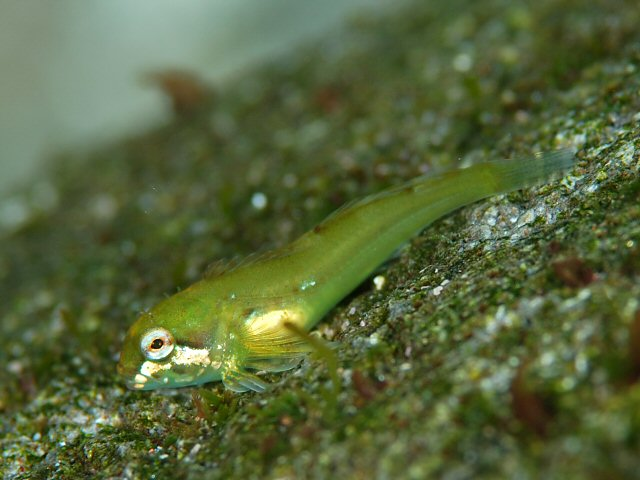
- O. maschalis

Scientific classification
- Kingdom: Animalia
- Phylum: Chordata
- Class: Actinopterygii
- Order: Perciformes
- Suborder: Cottoidei
- Family: Psychrolutidae
- Genus: Ocynectes; D. S. Jordan & Starks, 1904

Type species
- Ocynectes maschalis Jordan & Starks, 1904

= Ocynectes =

Genus of fishes

Ocynectes is a genus of marine ray-finned fishes belonging to the family Cottidae, the typical sculpins. This species is found in tidepools in the northwestern Pacific Ocean.

== Taxonomy ==
Ocynectes was first proposed as a monospecific genus in 1904 by the American ichthyologists David Starr Jordan and Edwin Chapin Starks with Ocynectes maschalis, which they described from Wakanoura in Wakayama Prefecture in Japan, designated as its type species. The 5th edition of Fishes of the World classifies this genus within the subfamily Cottinae of the family Cottidae, however, other authors classify the genus within the subfamily Psychrolutinae of the family Psychrolutidae.

== Etymology ==
Ocynectes is a combination of ocy, which means "swift", and nectes, meaning "swimmer", an allusion to the large pectoral fins of O. maschalis.

== Species ==
Ocynectes currently contains two recognized species:

- Ocynectes maschalis D. S. Jordan & Starks, 1904
- Ocynectes modestus Snyder, 1911

== Characteristics ==
Ocynectes was described by Jordan and Starks as being similar to Bero but they highlighted a difference in the lateral line which is not protected by concealed plates, has a tentacle at each pore and is not undulating towards the head. They also note the very large head which was greater than the length of the head or around half the length of the body. Both species are small fishes, O. maschalis attains a maximum published standard length of 10 cm (3.9 in) while O. modestus it is 7 cm (2.8 in).

== Distribution and habitat ==
Ocynectes sculpins are found in the northwestern Pacific Ocean around Japan and Sakhalin with O. maschalis being reported from South Korea. Both species are found in tidal pools.
