= Stlengis =

Scientific classification
- Kingdom: Animalia
- Phylum: Chordata
- Class: Actinopterygii
- Order: Perciformes
- Suborder: Cottoidei
- Family: Psychrolutidae
- Genus: Stlengis; Jordan & Starks, 1904

Type species
- Stlengis osensis Jordan & Starks, 1904

Synonyms
- Schmidtia Jordan & Starks, 1904; Schmidtina Jordan & Starks, 1904

Genus of fishes

Stlengis is a genus of marine ray-finned fishes belonging to the family Cottidae, the typical sculpins. These fishes are found in the northwestern Pacific Ocean where they are only known from the waters around Japan.

== Taxonomy ==
Stlengis was first proposed as a monospecific genus in 1904, by the American ichthyologists David Starr Jordan and Edwin Chapin Starks when they described Stlengis osensis off Ose Point in Suruga Bay, Japan. The 5th edition of Fishes of the World classifies the genus Stlengis within the subfamily Cottinae of the family Cottidae, however, other authors classify the genus within the subfamily Oligocottinae of the family Psychrolutidae.

== Species ==
There are currently three recognized species in this genus:

- Stlengis distoechus Bolin, 1936
- Stlengis misakia (Jordan & Starks, 1904)
- Stlengis osensis Jordan & Starks, 1904
