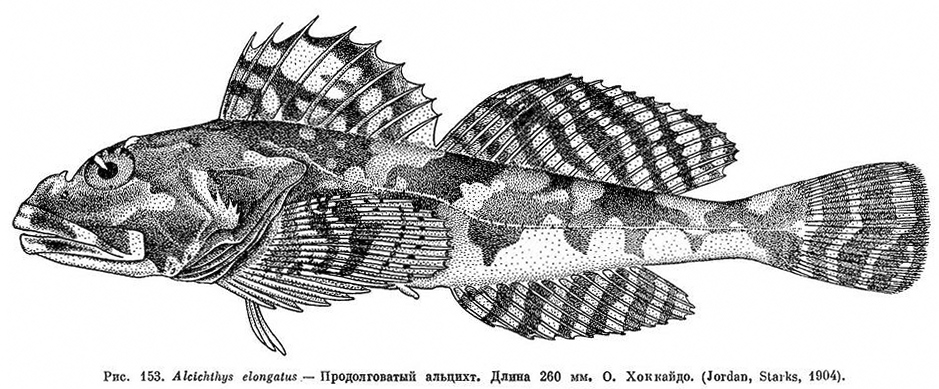

Conservation status
- Least Concern (IUCN 3.1)

Scientific classification
- Kingdom: Animalia
- Phylum: Chordata
- Class: Actinopterygii
- Order: Perciformes
- Suborder: Cottoidei
- Superfamily: Cottoidea
- Family: Psychrolutidae
- Genus: Alcichthys; Jordan & Starks, 1904
- Species: A. elongatus

Binomial name
- Alcichthys elongatus (Steindachner, 1881)

Synonyms
- Genus: Elaphichthys Jordan & Starks, 1904; Species: Centridermichthys elongatus Steindachner, 1881; Centridermichthys alcicornis Herzenstein, 1890; Alcichthys alcicornis (Herzenstein, 1890); Bero zanclus Snyder, 1911; Alcichthys okiensis Mori, 1956

= Alcichthys =

Genus of fish

Alcichthys is a monospecific genus of marine ray-finned fish belonging to the family Cottidae, the "typical" sculpins. The only species in the genus is Alcichthys elongatus, which occurs in the northwestern Pacific Ocean.

== Taxonomy ==
Alcichthys was first proposed as a genus in 1904 by the American ichthyologists David Starr Jordan and Edwin Chapin Starks with its only species being Centridermichthys alcicornis designated as its type species. C. alcicornis had been described in 1890 by the Russian zoologist Solomon Herzenstein with its type locality given as Tokyo, but is now considered to be a junior synonym of Centridermichthys elongatus which had been described by the Austrian ichthyologist Franz Steindachner in 1881 from the Sea of Japan. The 5th edition of Fishes of the World classifies the genus Alcichthys within the subfamily Cottinae of the family Cottidae, however, other authors classify the genus within the subfamily Psychrolutinae of the family Psychrolutidae.

== Etymology ==
Alcichthys is a combination of alce, from alcicornis which was the specific name of the type species and which means "elk horn", assumed to be for the wide, flat and multipointed spine of the preoperculum, similar to the antlers of an elk, with ichthys, Greek for "fish". The specific name "elongatus" was give because Steindachner described the body as "strongly stretched", in contrast to Bero elegans which he described in same paper.

== Distribution and habitat ==
Alcichthys is a marine, boreal fish which is known from the northwestern Pacific Ocean, including the Sea of Okhotsk and Japan. It dwells at a depth range of 15 to 269 m (49 to 883 ft), and inhabits rocky reefs.

== Biology ==
Alcichthys males can reach a maximum total length of 44 cm (17 in), but more commonly reach a TL of 31.5 cm (12.4 in). The maximum recorded weight is 1 kg (2.2 lb).

A. elongatus aggregates during the winter. In the Russian Federation, its spawning season has been reported to occur from April to June. It is preyed on by Gadus macrocephalus (the Pacific cod), Hemitripterus villosus, and Hexagrammos otakii. Its own diet consists of bony fish such as Engraulis japonicus and Sardinops sagax, crabs such as Erimacrus isenbeckii, Oregonia gracilis and spider crabs, euphausiids such as Euphausia pacifica, as well as cephalopods, polychaetes, and debris.

== Conservation status ==
Alcichthys has a wide distribution in its region, as well as a lack of known threats, save for rare occasions in which it is caught in gill nets, the IUCN redlist currently lists A. elongatus as least concern.
