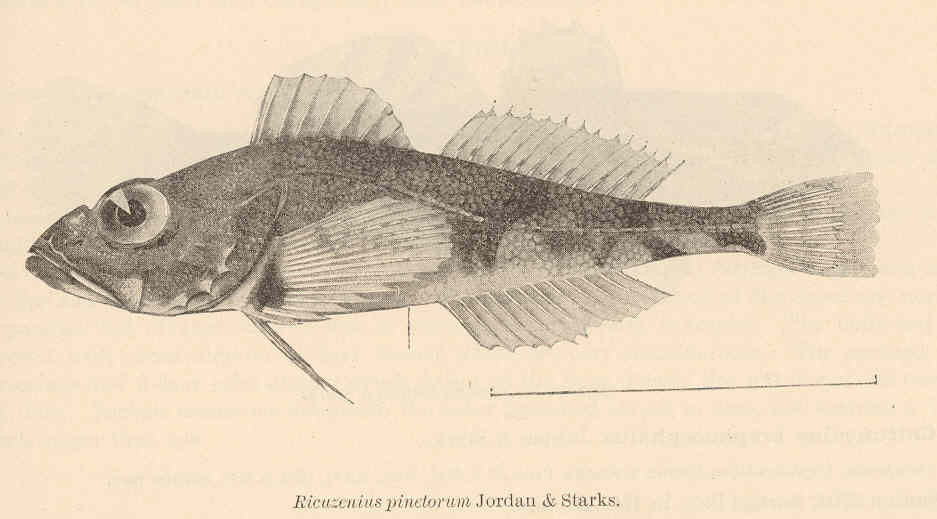
- Ricuzenius pinetorum

Scientific classification
- Domain: Eukaryota
- Kingdom: Animalia
- Phylum: Chordata
- Class: Actinopterygii
- Order: Perciformes
- Suborder: Cottoidei
- Family: Cottidae
- Subfamily: Cottinae
- Genus: Ricuzenius; Jordan & Starks, 1904

Type species
- Ricuzenius pinetorum Jordan & Starks, 1904

= Ricuzenius =

Genus of fishes

Ricuzenius is a genus of sculpins native to the northwestern Pacific Ocean.

== Species ==
There are currently two recognized species in this genus:

- Ricuzenius nudithorax Bolin, 1936
- Ricuzenius pinetorum Jordan & Starks, 1904
