= Astrocottus =

Scientific classification
- Kingdom: Animalia
- Phylum: Chordata
- Class: Actinopterygii
- Order: Perciformes
- Suborder: Cottoidei
- Family: Psychrolutidae
- Genus: Astrocottus; Bolin, 1936

Type species
- Astrocottus leprops Bolin, 1936

Genus of fishes

Astrocottus is a genus of marine ray-finned fishes belonging to the family Cottidae, the typical sculpins. These fishes are found in the northwestern Pacific Ocean.

== Taxonomy ==
Astrocottus was first proposed as a monospecific genus in 1936 by the American ichthyologist Rolf Ling Bolin when he described Astrocottus leprops from the Tsugaru Strait in Japan. The 5th edition of Fishes of the World classifies the genus Astrocottus within the subfamily Cottinae of the family Cottidae, however, other authors classify the genus within the subfamily Psychrolutinae of the family Psychrolutidae.

== Species ==
There are currently four recognized species in this genus:

- Astrocottus leprops Bolin, 1936
- Astrocottus matsubarae Katayama, 1942
- Astrocottus oyamai M. Watanabe, 1958
- Astrocottus regulus Tsuruoka, Maruyama & Yabe, 2008
