= Furcina =

Scientific classification
- Kingdom: Animalia
- Phylum: Chordata
- Class: Actinopterygii
- Order: Perciformes
- Suborder: Cottoidei
- Family: Psychrolutidae
- Genus: Furcina; D. S. Jordan & Starks, 1904

Type species
- Furcina ishikawae D. S. Jordan & Starks, 1904

Genus of fishes

Furcina is a small genus of marine ray-finned fishes belonging to the family Cottidae, the typical sculpins. This species is found in the northwestern Pacific Ocean from around Japan and the Republic of Korea.

== Taxonomy ==
Furcina was first proposed as a genus in 1904 by the American ichthyologists David Starr Jordan and Edwin Chapin Starks with Furcina ishikawae, which was a new species described by Jordan and Starks from Japan, designated as the type species. The 5th edition of Fishes of the World classifies this genus within the subfamily Cottinae of the family Cottidae, However, other authors classify the genus within the subfamily Oligocottinae of the family Psychrolutidae.

== Species ==
There are currently two recognized species in this genus:

- Furcina ishikawae D. S. Jordan & Starks, 1904 (Ishikawa's sculpin)
- Furcina osimae D. S. Jordan & Starks, 1904
