= Hairhead sculpin =

Scientific classification
- Kingdom: Animalia
- Phylum: Chordata
- Class: Actinopterygii
- Division: Teleostei
- Order: Perciformes
- Suborder: Cottoidei
- Superfamily: Cottoidea
- Family: Psychrolutidae
- Genus: Trichocottus; Soldatov & Pavlenko, 1915
- Species: T. brashnikovi

Binomial name
- Trichocottus brashnikovi Soldatov & Pavlenko, 1915

Species of fish

The hairhead sculpin (Trichocottus brashnikovi) is a species of marine ray-finned fish belonging to the family Cottidae, the typical sculpins. It is the only species in the monospecific genus Trichocottus.

== Taxonomy ==
The hairhead sculpin was first formally described in 1915 by the Russian zoologists Vladimir Soldatov and Mikhail Nikolaevich Pavlenko with its type locality given as the Strait of Tartary in the Sea of Japan. Soldatov and Pavlenko classified this species in the monospecific genus Trichocottus. The 5th edition of Fishes of the World classifies this genus in the subfamily Cottinae of the family Cottidae but other authorities classify it in the subfamily Psychrolutinae of the family Psychrolutidae.

== Etymology ==
The hairhead sculpin's genus name, Trichocottus prefixes Cottus with tricho which means "hair" or "ray", presumed to be an allusion to the many cirri on the head. The specific name honours the Russian ichthyologist Vladimir Konstantinovich Bražnikov.

== Description ==
The hairhead sculpin has a dark reddish brown head with a white spotted brown body, a white band around the caudal peduncle and a blackish base to the pectoral fin. In some adults this pattern is obscured by the development of whitish blotches and spots. There are no spines or bony knobs on the crown. The highest spine on the preoperculum is long and straight. The head, snout, jaws and the lateral line bear many cirri. Scales are mostly absent, other than a few short, rows of prickly bony plates on the flanks which are partially obscured by the pectoral fin, these first appear in fishes with a total length of around 95 mm (3.7 in). There are numerous small pores on the head, and these make it look granular. The lateral line on the trunk is straight, and is made up of three rows of pores. There are between 9 and 13 spines supporting the first dorsal fin, the second dorsal fin contains 15 or 16 soft rays and the anal fin has between 12 and 14 soft rays. The maximum published total length is 22.5 cm (8.9 in).

== Distribution and habitat ==
The hairhead sculpin occurs in the northern Pacific Ocean, including the Bering Sea, the Sea of Okhotsk, and the northern Sea of Japan. It is a demersal fish living along the sandy substrates of the seafloor at depths of up to 87 m (285 ft).
