= Artedielloides =

Scientific classification
- Kingdom: Animalia
- Phylum: Chordata
- Class: Actinopterygii
- Order: Perciformes
- Suborder: Cottoidei
- Superfamily: Cottoidea
- Family: Psychrolutidae
- Genus: Artedielloides; Soldatov, 1922
- Species: A. auriculatus

Binomial name
- Artedielloides auriculatus Soldatov, 1922

Genus of fishes

Artedielloides is a monospecific genus of marine ray-finned fish belonging to the family Cottidae, the typical sculpins. Its only species is Artedielloides auriculatus which is found in from Peter the Great Bay where it occurs at depths of from 29 to 70 m (95 to 230 ft). This species grows to a total length of 6 cm (2.4 in).
