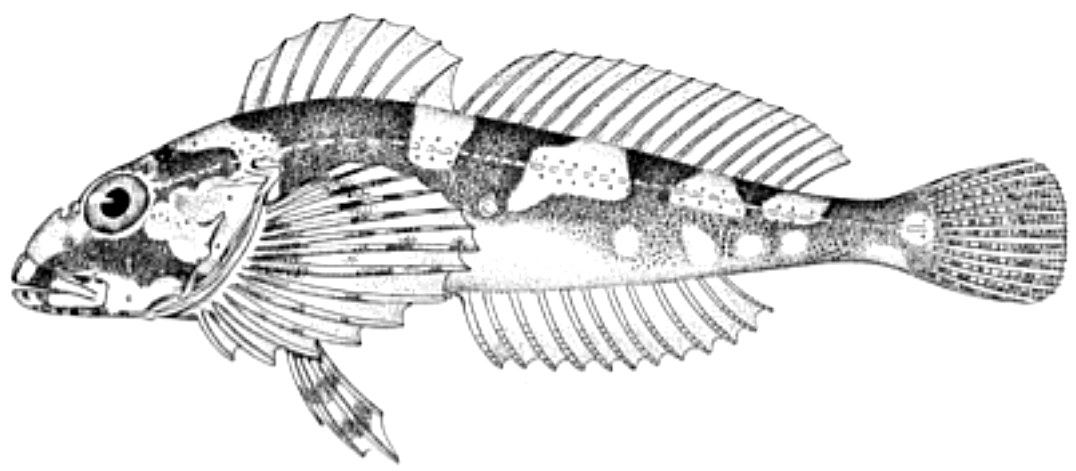

Scientific classification
- Kingdom: Animalia
- Phylum: Chordata
- Class: Actinopterygii
- Order: Perciformes
- Suborder: Cottoidei
- Family: Psychrolutidae
- Genus: Porocottus; Gill, 1859

Type species
- Porocottus quadrifilis Gill, 1859

Synonyms
- Crossias D. S. Jordan & Starks, 1904

= Porocottus =

Genus of fishes

Porocottus is a genus of marine ray-finned fishes belonging to the family Cottidae, the typical sculpins. These fishes are found in the northern and northwestern Pacific Ocean.

== Taxonomy ==
Porocottus was first proposed as a monospecific genus in 1859 by the American biologist Theodore Gill when he described Porocottus quadrifilis from the Bering Strait. The 5th edition of Fishes of the World classifies the genus Artediellus within the subfamily Cottinae of the family Cottidae, however, other authors classify the genus within the subfamily Myoxocephalinae of the family Psychrolutidae.

== Species ==
There are currently nine recognized species in this genus:

- Porocottus allisi (D. S. Jordan & Starks, 1904)
- Porocottus camtschaticus (Schmidt, 1916)
- Porocottus coronatus Yabe, 1992
- Porocottus japonicus Schmidt, 1935
- Porocottus leptosomus Muto, Y. Choi & Yabe, 2002
- Porocottus mednius (T. H. Bean, 1898) (Pored sculpin)
- Porocottus minutus (Pallas, 1814)
- Porocottus quadrifilis Gill, 1859
- Porocottus tentaculatus (Kner, 1868)
