= Atopocottus =

Scientific classification
- Kingdom: Animalia
- Phylum: Chordata
- Class: Actinopterygii
- Order: Perciformes
- Suborder: Cottoidei
- Superfamily: Cottoidea
- Family: Psychrolutidae
- Genus: Atopocottus; Bolin, 1936
- Species: A. tribranchius

Binomial name
- Atopocottus tribranchius Bolin, 1936

Genus of fishes

Atopocottus is a monospecific genus of marine ray-finned fish belonging to the family Cottidae, the typical sculpins. Its only species is Atopocottus tribranchius, found in the Sea of Japan where it is only known from the waters off of Niigata Prefecture. This species grows to 3 cm (1.2 in) SL.
