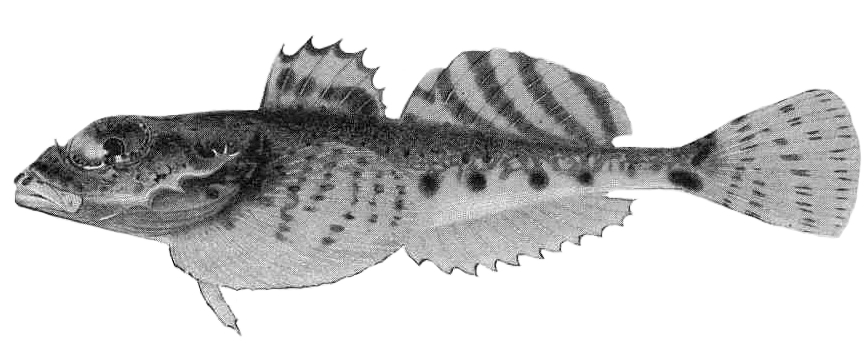
- Drawing of Cottiusculus schmidti

Scientific classification
- Kingdom: Animalia
- Phylum: Chordata
- Class: Actinopterygii
- Division: Teleostei
- Order: Perciformes
- Suborder: Cottoidei
- Family: Psychrolutidae
- Genus: Cottiusculus; Jordan & Starks, 1904

Type species
- Cottiusculus gonez Jordan & Starks 1904

= Cottiusculus =

Genus of fishes

Cottiusculus is a genus of marine ray-finned fishes belonging to the family Cottidae, the typical sculpins. The fishes in this genus are found in the northwestern Pacific Ocean.

== Species ==
There are currently four recognized species in this genus:

- Cottiusculus gonez Jordan & Starks, 1904
- Cottiusculus nihonkaiensis Kai & Nakabo, 2009
- Cottiusculus primoricus Prokofiev, 2020
- Cottiusculus schmidti Jordan & Starks, 1904
