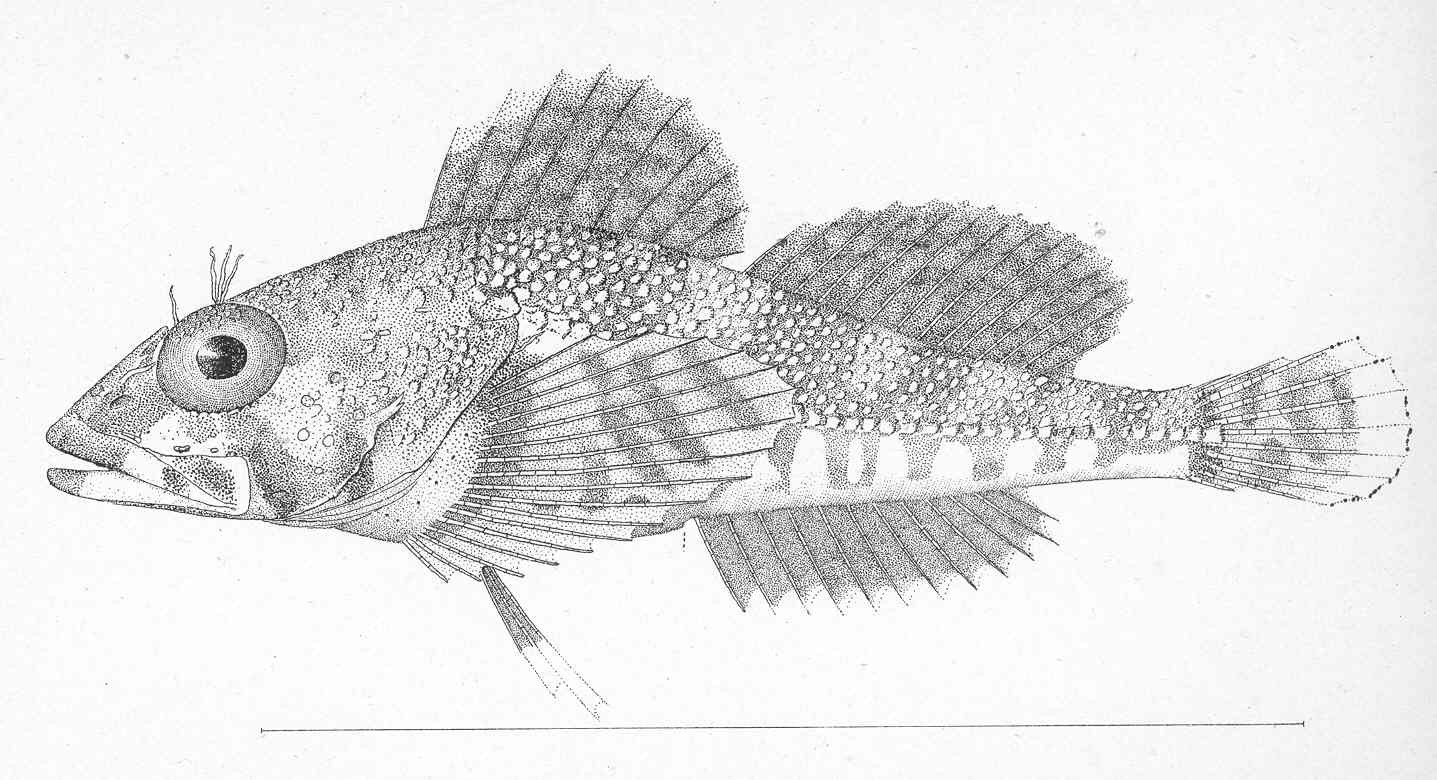
- Ruscarius meanyi

Scientific classification
- Kingdom: Animalia
- Phylum: Chordata
- Class: Actinopterygii
- Order: Perciformes
- Suborder: Cottoidei
- Family: Psychrolutidae
- Genus: Ruscarius; D. S. Jordan & Starks, 1895

Type species
- Ruscarius meanyi D. S. Jordan & Starks, 1895

= Ruscarius =

Genus of fishes

Ruscarius is a genus of ray-finned fishes belonging to the family Cottidae, the typical sculpins. These fishes are found in the eastern Pacific Ocean.

== Species ==
There are currently two recognized species in this genus:

- Ruscarius creaseri (C. L. Hubbs, 1926) (Roughcheek sculpin)
- Ruscarius meanyi (D. S. Jordan & Starks, 1895) (Puget Sound sculpin)
