= Phasmatocottus =

Scientific classification
- Kingdom: Animalia
- Phylum: Chordata
- Class: Actinopterygii
- Order: Perciformes
- Suborder: Cottoidei
- Superfamily: Cottoidea
- Family: Psychrolutidae
- Genus: Phasmatocottus; Bolin, 1936
- Species: P. ctenopterygius

Binomial name
- Phasmatocottus ctenopterygius Bolin, 1936

Monotypic genus of fish

Phasmatocottus is a monospecific genus of marine ray-finned fish belonging to the family Cottidae, the "typical" sculpins. The only species in the genus is Phasmatocottus ctenopterygius from the northwestern Pacific.

== Taxonomy ==
Phasmatocottus was first proposed as a monospecific genus in 1936 by the American ichthyologist Rolf Ling Bolin when he described Phasmatocottus ctenopterygius from Sendai Bay in Japan. The 5th edition of Fishes of the World classifies this genus within the subfamily Cottinae of the family Cottidae, however, other authors classify the genus within the subfamily Psychrolutinae of the family Psychrolutidae.

== Etymology ==
Phasmatocottus prefixes the name of the type genus of the Cottidae, Cottus with phasma, which means "ghost" or "spectre", Bolin did not explain what this alluded to. The specific name ctenopterygius means "comb-finned" and is a reference to the anterior dorsal fin having rays apparently unconnected to the fin membrane.

== Description ==
Phasmatocottus has a rather compressed body with a largely ovoid cross section. The skin is smooth and lacks scales, other than enlarged scales under the skin of the lateral line. The preoperculum has 4 spines, the uppermost is enlarged and has branches. There are vomerine teeth but no palatine teeth. The gill membranes have a wide join and this forms a fold across the throat. The membranes between the spines of the first dorsal fin are deeply notched down almost as far as the base of the spines. There are 6 or 7 spines in the first dorsal fin →while the second is supported by between 11 and 13 soft rays. The anal fin has 9 or 10 soft rays. There are no free spines on the snout and no spines on the head. The caudal fin is marginally rounded. In alcohol the colour of the body is darkish brown with darker fins. This is a small sculpin with a maximum standard length of 56.3 mm (2.22 in).

== Distribution and habitat ==
Phasmatocottus Is found in the northwestern Pacific Ocean where it has been recorded on two occasions, the first was the collection of the holotype in Sendai Bay and the second was in 2001 off Iturup Island in the Kurils. It has been recorded from depths in excess of 500 m (1,640 ft).
