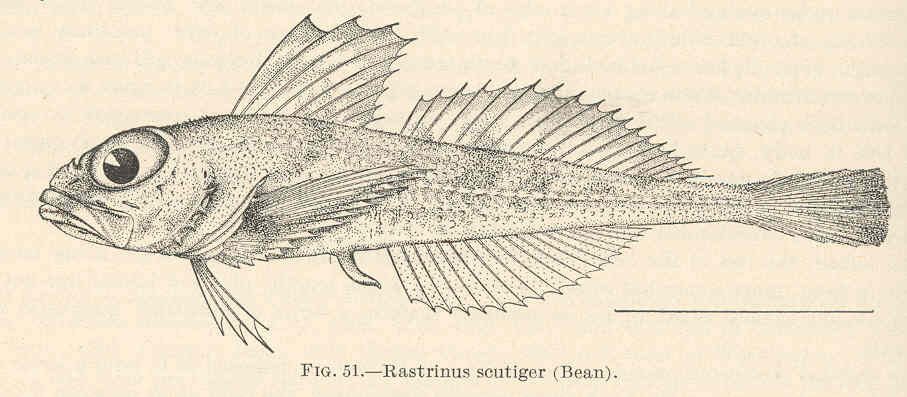

Scientific classification
- Kingdom: Animalia
- Phylum: Chordata
- Class: Actinopterygii
- Order: Perciformes
- Suborder: Cottoidei
- Superfamily: Cottoidea
- Family: Psychrolutidae
- Genus: Rastrinus; D. S. Jordan & Evermann, 1896
- Species: R. scutiger

Binomial name
- Rastrinus scutiger (T. H. Bean, 1890)

Synonyms
- Icelus scutiger Bean, 1890; Stlegicottus xenogrammus Bolin, 1936

= Rastrinus =

Species of fish

Rastrinus is a monospecific genus of marine ray-finned fish belonging to the family Cottidae, the "typical" sculpins. The only species in the genus is Rastrinus scutiger which is found from the Gulf of Alaska to the Bering Sea in the northeastern Pacific Ocean. It is a deep water species, occurring at depths of from 100 to 740 metres (330 to 2,430 ft), most commonly found at 200 to 300 metres (660 to 980 ft). This species grows to a length of 16 centimetres (6.3 in) total length.

Rastrinus was first proposed as a genus in 1896 by the American ichthyologists David Starr Jordan and Barton Warren Evermann with its only species being Icelus scutiger also designated as its type species. I. scutiger had been described in 1890 by the American ichthyologist Tarleton Hoffman Bean with its type locality given as Trinity Island, in the Bering Sea. The 5th edition of Fishes of the World classifies the genus Rastrinus within the subfamily Cottinae of the family Cottidae, however, other authors classify the genus within the subfamily Icelinae of the family Psychrolutidae.

The genus name, Rastrinus, means like as scraper, while the specific name scutiger means shield bearer, Both are presumed to be a reference to the rough scales of this sculpin.
