= Taurocottus =

Scientific classification
- Kingdom: Animalia
- Phylum: Chordata
- Class: Actinopterygii
- Order: Perciformes
- Suborder: Cottoidei
- Superfamily: Cottoidea
- Family: Psychrolutidae
- Genus: Taurocottus; Soldatov & Pavlenko, 1915
- Species: T. bergii

Binomial name
- Taurocottus bergii Soldatov & Pavlenko, 1915

Species of fish

Taurocottus is a monospecific genus of marine ray-finned fish belonging to the family Cottidae, the typical sculpins. Its only species is Taurocottus bergii which is found in the northwestern Pacific Ocean. It occurs at depths of 40 to 120 m (130 to 390 ft). This species grows to a maximum published standard length of 20 cm (7.9 in).
