= Vellitor =

Scientific classification
- Kingdom: Animalia
- Phylum: Chordata
- Class: Actinopterygii
- Division: Teleostei
- Order: Perciformes
- Suborder: Cottoidei
- Family: Psychrolutidae
- Genus: Vellitor; Jordan & Starks, 1904

Type species
- Podabrus centropomus Richardson, 1848

Synonyms
- Podabrus Richardson, 1848

Genus of fishes

Vellitor is a genus of marine ray-finned fishes belonging to the family Cottidae, the typical sculpins. These fishes are found in seawedd beds in the northwestern Pacific Ocean.

== Taxonomy ==
Vellitor was first proposed as a genus in 1904 by the American ichthyologists David Starr Jordan and Edwin Chapin Starks with Podabrus centropomus, which had been described by Sir John Richardson in 1848 from Quelpart in the Korea Strait, as its type species. Richardson's name, Podabrus was an unavailable as a name under the ICZN as it was preoccupied by a mammal genus, the Sminthopsis proposed by John Gould in 1845 and by a beetle genus proposed by John O. Westwood in 1838, so Jordan and Starks' name is a replacement. In 1983 a second species was described, differing in the number of pectoral fin rays. The 5th edition of Fishes of the World classifies the genus Triglops within the subfamily Cottinae of the family Cottidae, however, other authors classify the genus within the subfamily Psychrolutinae of the family Psychrolutidae.

== Species ==
There are currently two recognized species in this genus:

- Vellitor centropomus (J. Richardson, 1848)
- Vellitor minutus Iwata, 1983

== Characteristics ==
Vellitor sculpins have no spines or cirri on the upper part of the head and they have a deep, laterally compressed body. They also have a narrow caudal peduncle. These fishes range in maximum published standard lengths from 9 cm (3.5 in) in V. minutus to 12 cm (4.7 in) in V. centropomus.

== Distribution and habitat ==
Vellitor sculpins are found in the northwestern Pacific Ocean around Japan and South Korea where they are demersal fishes occurring in beds of seaweed.
