= Radulinopsis =

Scientific classification
- Kingdom: Animalia
- Phylum: Chordata
- Class: Actinopterygii
- Order: Perciformes
- Suborder: Cottoidei
- Family: Psychrolutidae
- Genus: Radulinopsis; Soldatov & Lindberg, 1930

Type species
- Radulinopsis derjavini Soldatov & Lindberg 1930

Genus of fishes

Radulinopsis is a genus of marine ray-finned fishes belonging to the family Cottidae, the typical sculpins. These fishes are found in the northwestern Pacific Ocean.

== Species ==
There are currently two recognized species in this genus:

- Radulinopsis derjavini Soldatov & Lindberg, 1930
- Radulinopsis taranetzi Yabe & Maruyama, 2001
