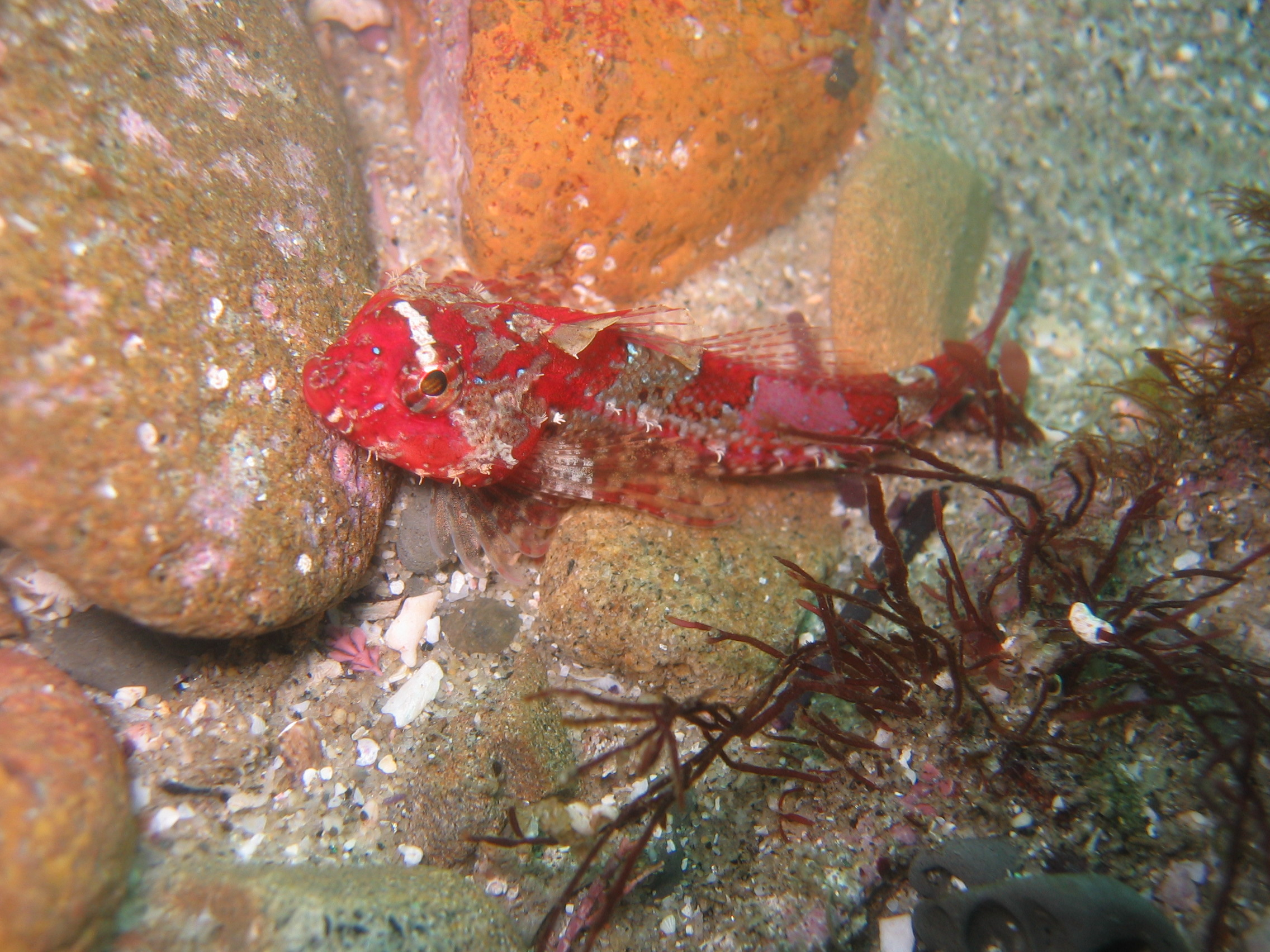
- In La Jolla, California

Scientific classification
- Kingdom: Animalia
- Phylum: Chordata
- Class: Actinopterygii
- Division: Teleostei
- Order: Perciformes
- Suborder: Cottoidei
- Superfamily: Cottoidea
- Family: Psychrolutidae
- Genus: Orthonopias; Starks & Mann, 1911
- Species: O. triacis

Binomial name
- Orthonopias triacis Starks & Mann, 1911

= Snubnose sculpin =

Species of fish

The snubnose sculpin (Orthonopias triacis) is a species of marine ray-finned fish belonging to the family Cottidae, the typical sculpins. This fish is found in the eastern Pacific Ocean.

== Taxonomy ==
The snubnose sculpin was first formally described in 1911 by the American ichthyologists Edwin Chapin Starks and William M. Mann with its type locality given as the Cortes Bank off California. Starks and Mann classified the new species in the monospecific genus Orthonopias. The 5th edition of Fishes of the World classifies this genus within the subfamily Cottinae of the family Cottidae, however, other authors classify the genus within the subfamily Oligocottinae of the family Psychrolutidae.

== Etymology ==
The snubnose sculpin's genus name Orthonopias was not explained by its authors but it is thought to probably be a combination of ortho meaning "straight" or "upright", and ops, meaning "eye", which may allude to the eyes being set high, above the dorsal profile of the head. Similarly Starks and Mann did not explain the specific name triacis which may mean "three points", a reference to the three points on the uppermost spine of preoperculum.

== Description ==
The snubnose sculpin has a large head and large eyes, the snout is very short and the body is tapering towards the caudal peduncle. The anus is positioned quite far well back on the body and is nearer to the pelvic fins than it is to the anal fin. There is a single slender sharp spine on the preoperculam and above this is another spine with 2 or more points. The color varies and they have the ability tochange color to camouflage them against their background. Typically they are mottled with brown, lavender, orange, reds, and white. The lower body is overall orange color with white on the underside. The head is maroon and there are four clear dark brown saddle-like blotches, The third saddle blotch has a brick-red center, there is pink between the first and second saddle blotches and brown-orange between the second and third saddle blotches. There are orange bars on the caudal and dorsal fins, with a dusky spot at the front of the first dorsal fin. The caudal fin is rounded, the dorsal fin is supported by 9 spines and between 16 and 18 soft rays and the anal fin has between 13 and 15 soft rays. The scales are large and obvious on the crown and the scales along the lateral line have cirri. This species has a maximum published total length of 10 cm (3.9 in).

== Biology ==
The snubnose sculpin occurs in intertidal rocky areas in depths less than 30 meters. It reproduces moderately fast, with a doubling time between 1.4 and 4.4 years. Its range is from Monterey Bay, California to northern Baja California, Mexico.
