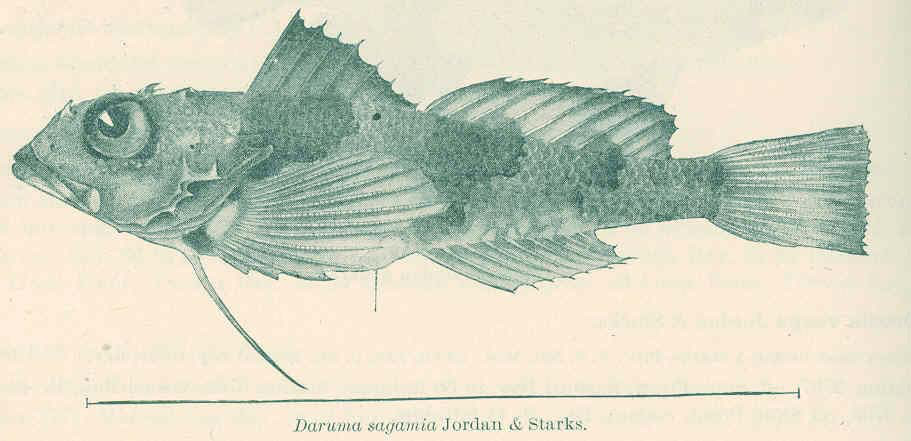

Scientific classification
- Kingdom: Animalia
- Phylum: Chordata
- Class: Actinopterygii
- Order: Perciformes
- Suborder: Cottoidei
- Superfamily: Cottoidea
- Family: Psychrolutidae
- Genus: Daruma; Jordan & Starks, 1904
- Species: D. sagamia

Binomial name
- Daruma sagamia Jordan & Starks, 1904

= Daruma sagamia =

Species of fish

Daruma sagamia is a species of marine ray-finned fish belonging to the family Cottidae, the typical sculpins. This species is found in the Pacific Ocean waters around Japan. It is found at depths of from 50 to 80 metres (160 to 260 ft). This species grows to a length of 3 centimetres (1.2 in) SL. This species is the only known member of its genus.
