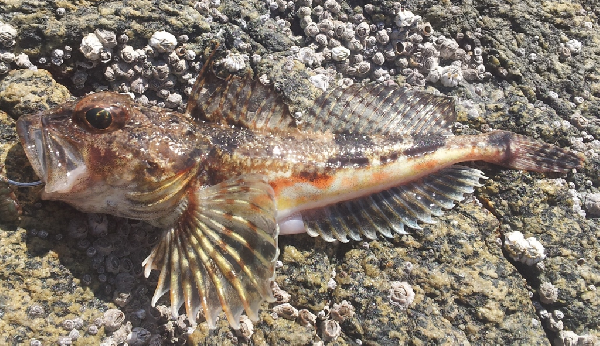

Scientific classification
- Kingdom: Animalia
- Phylum: Chordata
- Class: Actinopterygii
- Order: Perciformes
- Suborder: Cottoidei
- Superfamily: Cottoidea
- Family: Psychrolutidae
- Genus: Chitonotus; Lockington, 1879
- Species: C. pugetensis

Binomial name
- Chitonotus pugetensis (Steindachner, 1876)

Synonyms
- Artedius pugetensis Steindachner, 1876

= Roughback sculpin =

Species of fish

The roughback sculpin (Chitonotus pugetensis) is a species of marine ray-finned fish belonging to the family Cottidae, the typical sculpins. This species is found in the eastern Pacific Ocean. The roughback sculpin is the only known member of the genus Chitonotus.

== Taxonomy ==
The roughback sculpin was first formally described as Artedius pugetensis in 1876 by the Austrian ichthyologist Franz Steindachner with its type locality given as Fox Island near Steilacom, northern Puget Sound and San Francisco. In 1879 the English zoologist, and curator of the California Academy of Sciences, William Neale Lockington proposed the monospecific genus Chitonotus for the roughback sculpin. The 5th edition of Fishes of the World classifies the genus Alcichthys within the subfamily Cottinae of the family Cottidae, however, other authors classify the genus within the subfamily Icelinae of the family Psychrolutidae.

== Etymology ==
The roughback sculpin's genus name, Chitonotus, is a combuination of chiton, meaning an "outer coat" or a "coat of mail", and notos, meaning back, referring to the ctenoid scales on its upper body which give it a rough feeling. The specific name refers to its type locality in Puget Sound.

== Distribution and habitat ==
The roughback sculpin is found in the eastern Pacific Ocean where it occurs along the western coast of North America from Bahia Santa Maria in Baja California Sur, Mexico, north to Trail Island in the Wark Channel of British Columbia and, probably, also in southeastern Alaska.

It is a demersal fish occurring on substrates of sand, gravel, small rocks, and rock in the intertidal zone down to depths of 144 m (472 ft).

== Description ==
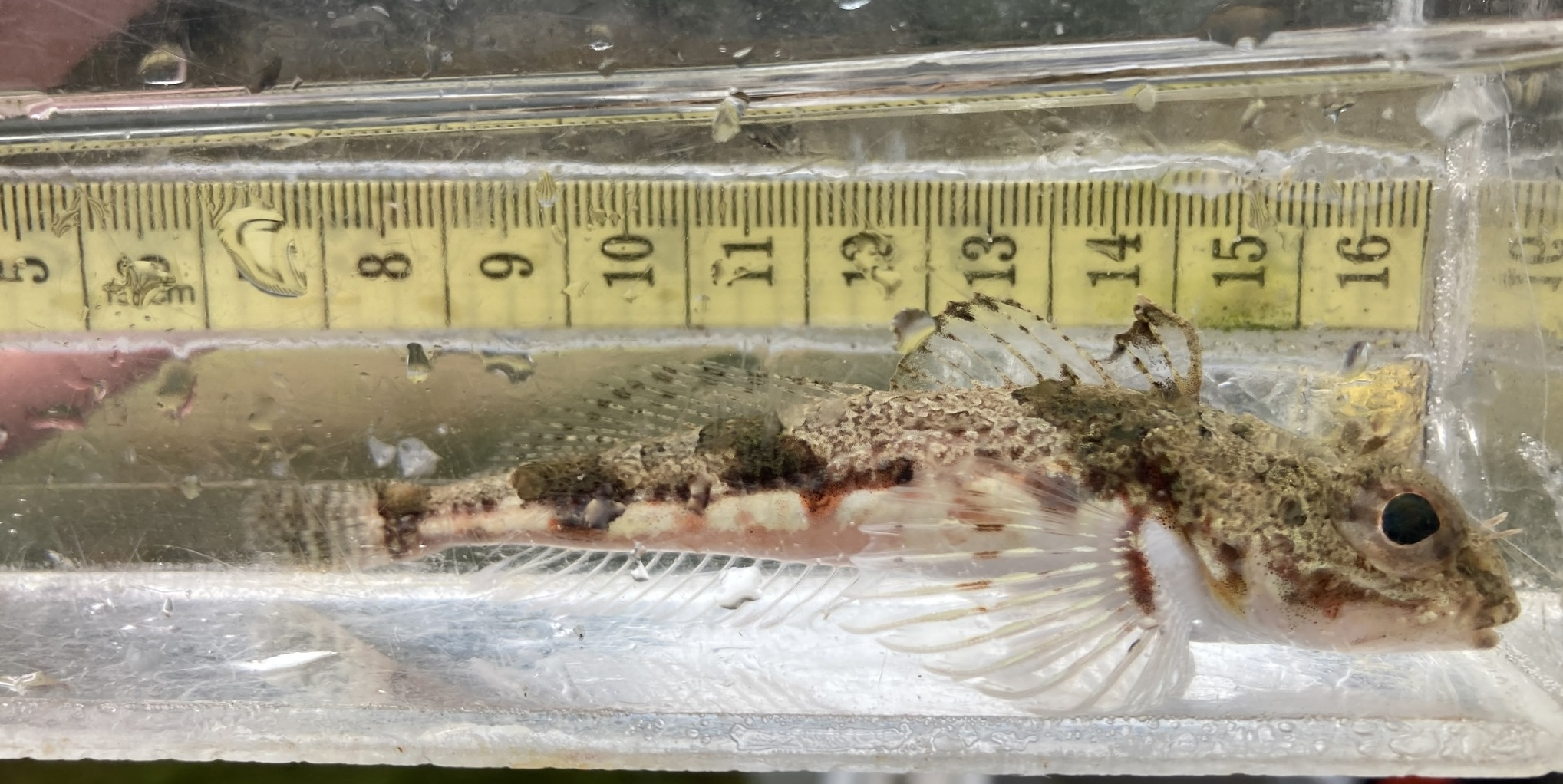
In British Columbia

The roughback sculpin has body which is elongated and tapers towards the tail, with a near complete covering of large scales. The large head is flattened and wide. The overall color is brown and gray on the upper body fading to white towards the belly. There are dark saddles and blotches along the upper flanks and back. The first dorsal fin has a black margin and a red blotch develops in the breeding season. There are large branched spines on the cheeks, resembling antlers. The first spine in the dorsal fin is elongated and there is a deep incision between its third and fourth spines. The dorsal fins are supported by 10 or 11 spines and 14 to 17 soft rays, the anal fin contains 14 to 17 soft rays, the pectoral fins have16 to 18 rays and there is a single spine and 3 soft rays in the pelvic fins. The large caudal fin is rounded. The maximum published total length is 23 cm (9.1 in)>

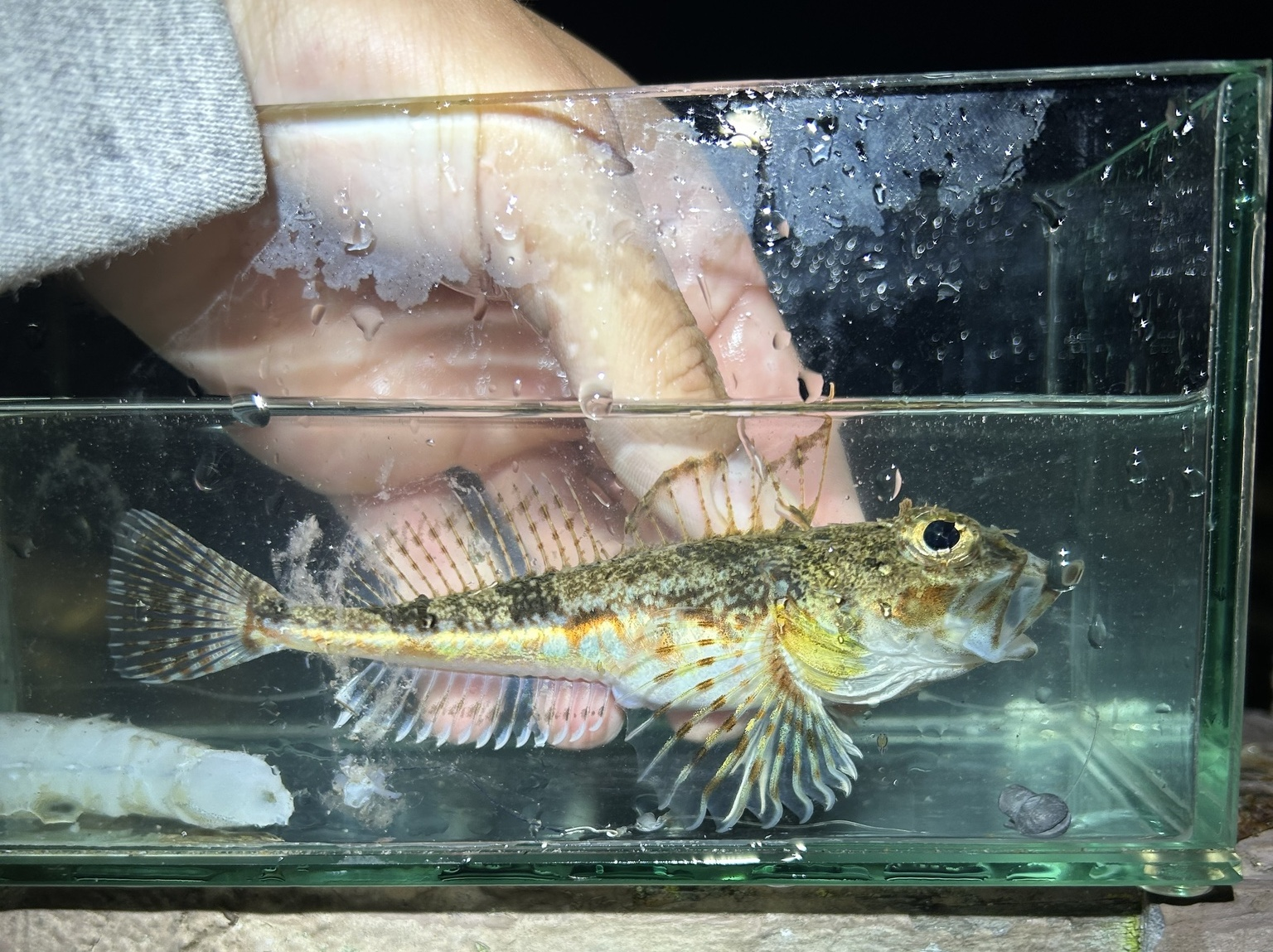
In Washington

== Biology ==
The roughback sculpin is a nocturnal, ambush predator, lying in wait to capture prey. Their prey is made up of crustaceans, small fishes, polychaetes and larvaceans. In southern California has a lengthy spawning season which peaks in the Spring, although populations further north may have a more restricted spawning season. Gravid females held a mean of 1043 eggs, larger females being more fecund than smaller individuals.

== Utilization ==
The roughback sculpin is displayed in public aquaria.
