= Artediellina =

Scientific classification
- Kingdom: Animalia
- Phylum: Chordata
- Class: Actinopterygii
- Order: Perciformes
- Suborder: Cottoidei
- Superfamily: Cottoidea
- Family: Psychrolutidae
- Genus: Artediellina; Taranetz, 1937
- Species: A. antilope

Binomial name
- Artediellina antilope (P. J. Schmidt, 1937)

Synonyms
- Artediellus antilope Schmidt, 1937

Genus of fishes

Artediellina is a monospecific genus of marine ray-finned fish belonging to the family Cottidae, the typical sculpins. Its only species is Artediellina antilope which is found in the Sea of Okhotsk where it occurs at depths of from 300 to 615 m (984 to 2,018 ft).
