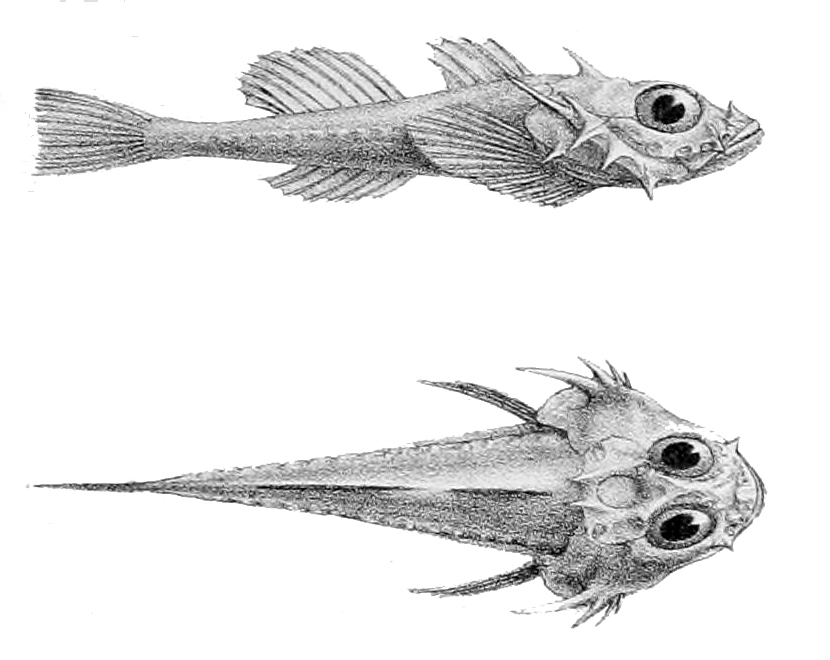
- Z. bathybius
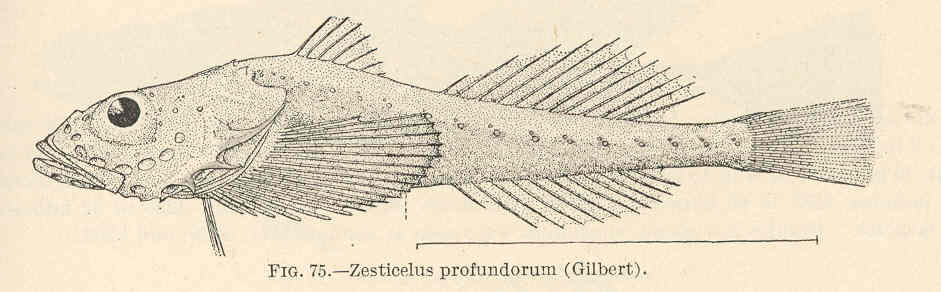
- Z. profundorum

Scientific classification
- Kingdom: Animalia
- Phylum: Chordata
- Class: Actinopterygii
- Division: Teleostei
- Order: Perciformes
- Suborder: Cottoidei
- Family: Psychrolutidae
- Genus: Zesticelus; Jordan & Evermann, 1896

Type species
- Acanthocottus profundorum Gilbert, 1896

= Zesticelus =

Genus of fishes

Zesticelus is a genus of marine ray-finned fishes belonging to the family Cottidae, the typical sculpins. These fishes are found in the North Pacific Ocean.

== Taxonomy ==
Zesticelus was first proposed as a monospecific genus in 1896 by the American ichthyologists David Starr Jordan and Barton Warren Evermann with Acanthocottus profundorum designated as its type species. A. profundorum was originally described in 1896 by Charles Henry Gilbert who gave its type locality as the Bering Sea north of Unalaska Island. The 5th edition of Fishes of the World classifies the genus Zesticelus within the subfamily Cottinae of the family Cottidae, however, other authors classify the genus within the subfamily Psychrolutinae of the family Psychrolutidae.

== Species ==
There are currently three recognized species in this genus:

- Zesticelus bathybius (Günther, 1878)
- Zesticelus ochotensis Yabe, 1995
- Zesticelus profundorum (C. H. Gilbert, 1896) (Flabby sculpin)

There is a fourth species which has an uncertain taxonomic status, Zesticelus japonicus which was described from Niigata in Japan in 1957 but the type has been lost.

== Characteristics ==
Zesticelus sculpins have naked bodies which do not have scales or cirri. The branchiostegal membranes that are united and old over the isthmus, There are large pores in the sensory canals on the head, The highest spine on the preoperculum is long and slightly curved. There are teeth on the prevomer but not on the palatine. These are small fishes with the largest species, Z. profundorum, having a maximum published total length of 6.4 cm (2.5 in).

== Distribution ==
Zesticelus sculpins are found in the North Pacific Ocean from Japan to California. They are deep sea species.
