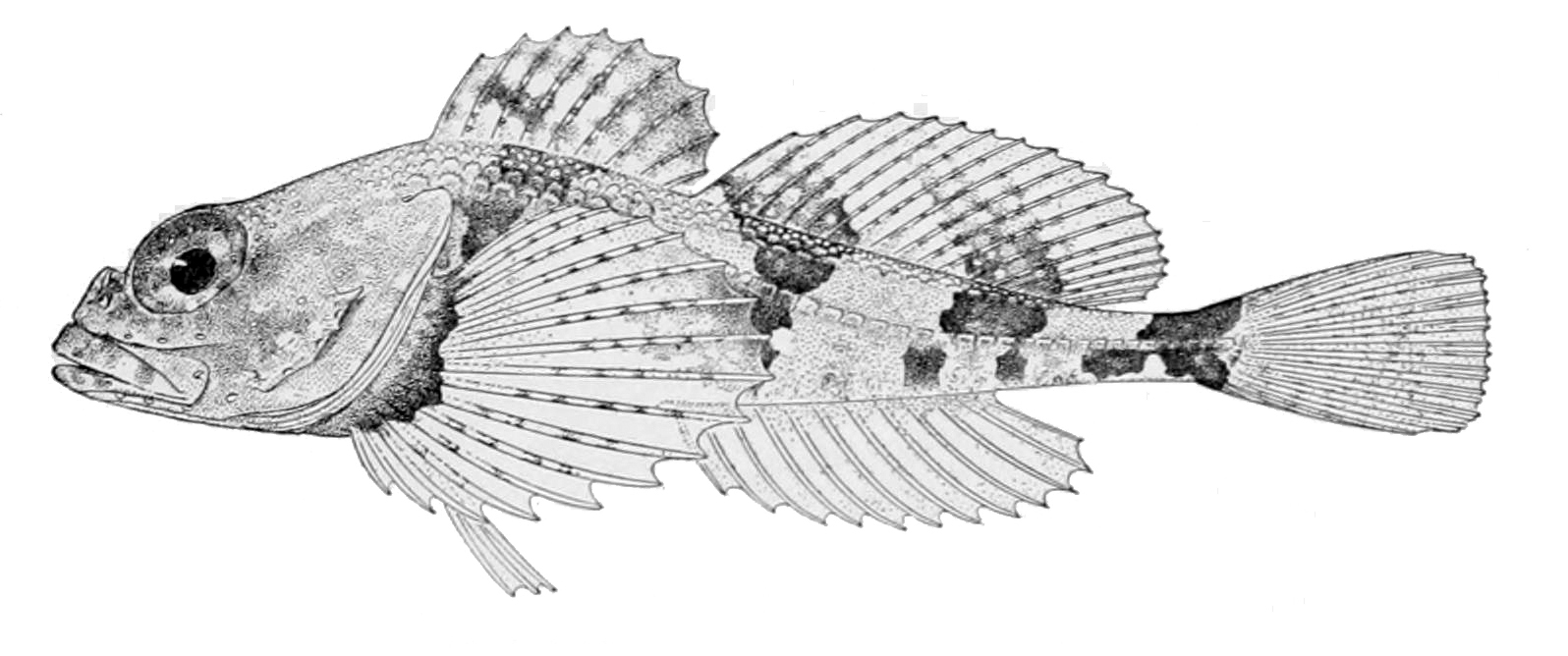
- S. beringianum

Scientific classification
- Kingdom: Animalia
- Phylum: Chordata
- Class: Actinopterygii
- Order: Perciformes
- Suborder: Cottoidei
- Family: Psychrolutidae
- Genus: Stelgistrum; Jordan & Gilbert, 1898

Type species
- Stelgistrum stejnegeri Jordan & Gilbert, 1898

Synonyms
- Stelgistrops Hubbs, 1926

= Stelgistrum =

Genus of fishes

Stelgistrum is a genus of marine ray-finned fishes belonging to the family Cottidae, the typical sculpins. These fishes are found in the northern Pacific Ocean.

== Taxonomy ==
Stelgistrum was first proposed as a monospecific genus in 1898 by the American ichthyologists David Starr Jordan and Charles Henry Gilbert when they described Stelgistrum stejnegeri from Robben Island in the Sea of Okhotsk. The 5th edition of Fishes of the World classifies the genus Stelgistrum within the subfamily Cottinae of the family Cottidae, however, other authors classify the genus within the subfamily Psychrolutinae of the family Psychrolutidae.

== Species ==
There are currently three recognized species in this genus:

- Stelgistrum beringianum Gilbert & Burke, 1912
- Stelgistrum concinnum Andriashev, 1935 (Largeplate sculpin)
- Stelgistrum stejnegeri Jordan & Gilbert, 1898
