= Argyrocottus =

Scientific classification
- Kingdom: Animalia
- Phylum: Chordata
- Class: Actinopterygii
- Division: Teleostei
- Order: Perciformes
- Suborder: Cottoidei
- Superfamily: Cottoidea
- Family: Psychrolutidae
- Genus: Argyrocottus; Herzenstein, 1892
- Species: A. zanderi

Binomial name
- Argyrocottus zanderi Herzenstein, 1892

Genus of fishes

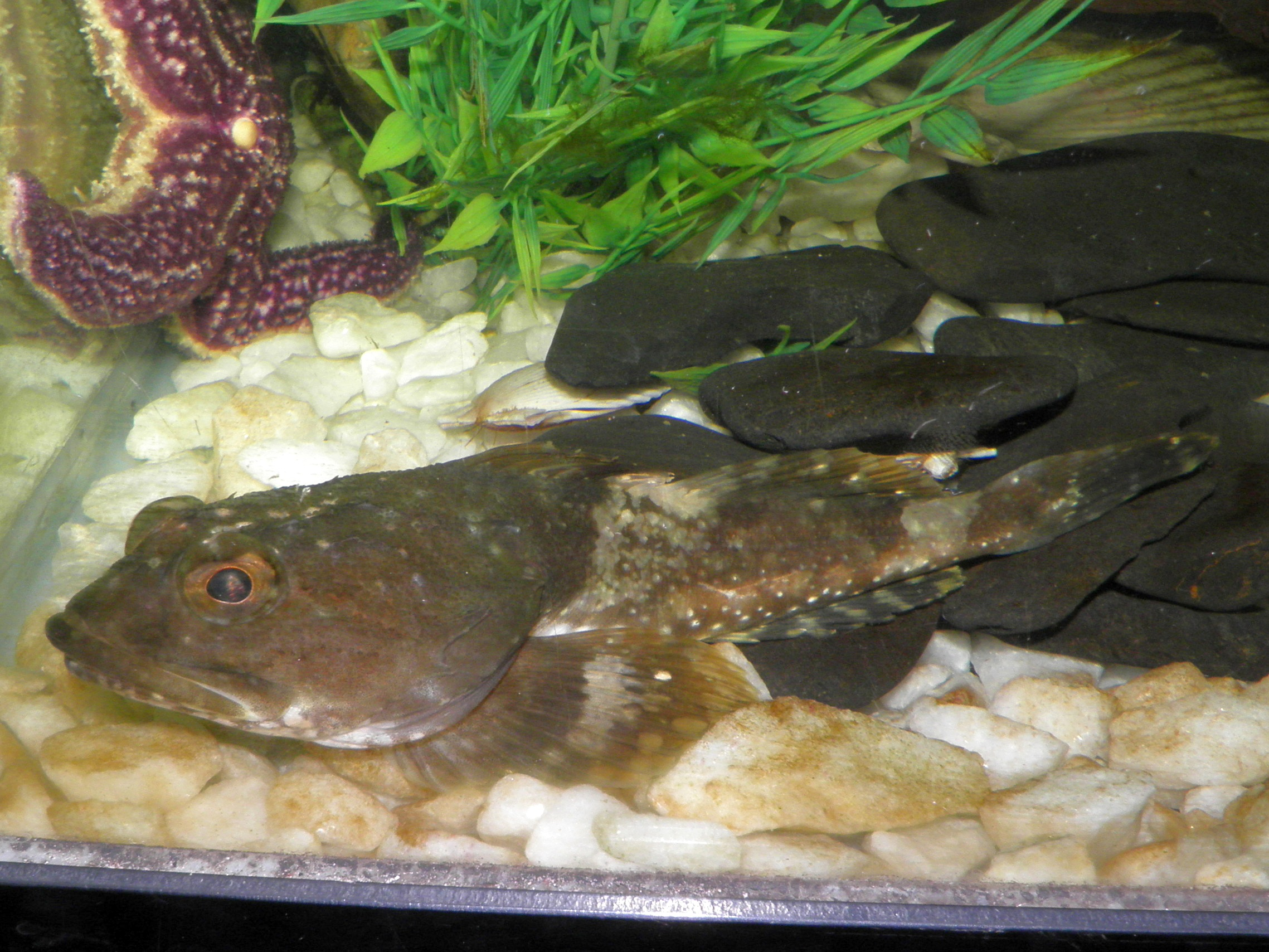
Argyrocottus zanderi in Oceanarium of Vladivostok

Argyrocottus is a monospecific genus of marine ray-finned fish belonging to the family Cottidae, the typical sculpins. Its only species is Argyrocottus zanderi which is found in the northwestern Pacific Ocean from Japan to the Kuril Islands and in the Sea of Japan. It is found at depths of from 0 to 85 metres (0 to 279 ft). This species grows to a standard length of 9 centimetres (3.5 in). This taxon was first formally described in 1892 by the Russian zoologist Solomon Herzenstein with its type locality given as Korsakov on Sakhalin in the Sea of Okhotsk. The 5th edition of Fishes of the World classifies the genus Argyrocottus within the subfamily Cottinae of the family Cottidae, however, other authors classify the genus within the subfamily Myoxocephalinae of the family Psychrolutidae. although others place the subfamily Myoxocephalinae within the Cottidae.

Argyrocottus is a combination of argyros, which means "silver", a reference to the silvery spots on the underside and flanks, and the two silvery stripes, one running from underneath the eye to the base of the lower jaw, and the other from the eye to preoperculum, and Cottus, the type genus of the family Cottidae.
