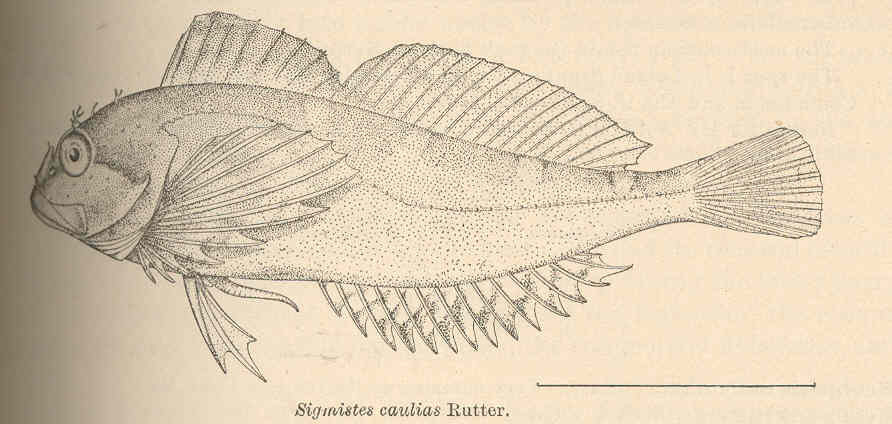
- Sigmistes caulias

Scientific classification
- Kingdom: Animalia
- Phylum: Chordata
- Class: Actinopterygii
- Order: Perciformes
- Suborder: Cottoidei
- Family: Psychrolutidae
- Genus: Sigmistes; Rutter, 1898

Type species
- Sigmistes caulias Rutter, 1898

= Sigmistes =

Genus of fishes

Sigmistes is a genus of marine ray-finned fishes belonging to the family Cottidae, the typical sculpins. These fishes are found in the northern Pacific Ocean.

== Taxonomy ==
Sigmistes was first proposed as a monospecific genus in 1898 by the American ichthyologist Cloudsley Louis Rutter when he described Sigmistes caulias from rock pools at Karluk on Kodiak Island in Alaska. The 5th edition of Fishes of the World classifies the genus Sigmistes within the subfamily Cottinae of the family Cottidae, however, other authors classify the genus within the subfamily Psychrolutinae of the family Psychrolutidae.

== Species ==
There are currently two recognized species in this genus:

- Sigmistes caulias Rutter, 1898 (Kelp sculpin)
- Sigmistes smithi L. P. Schultz, 1938 (Arched sculpin)
