= Bolinia =

Scientific classification
- Kingdom: Animalia
- Phylum: Chordata
- Class: Actinopterygii
- Order: Perciformes
- Suborder: Cottoidei
- Superfamily: Cottoidea
- Family: Psychrolutidae
- Genus: Bolinia; Yabe, 1991
- Species: B. euryptera

Binomial name
- Bolinia euryptera Yabe, 1991

Species of fish

Bolinia is a monospecific genus of marine ray-finned fish belonging to the family Cottidae, the typical sculpins. This taxon is endemic to the northern Pacific Ocean around the Aleutian Islands of Amukta, Carlisle, and Semisopochnoi. It is found at depths of between 201 to 410 metres (659 to 1,345 ft). This species grows to a length of 18.9 centimetres (7.4 in) SL. The only species in the genus is Bolinia euryptera.

== Taxonomy ==
Bolinia was first proposed as a monospecific genus in 1991 by Mamoru Yabe when he described Bolinia euryptera from near Amukta Pass in the Aleutian Islands. The 5th edition of Fishes of the World classifies the genus Bolinia within the subfamily Cottinae of the family Cottidae, however, other authors classify the genus within the subfamily Psychrolutinae of the family Psychrolutidae.
