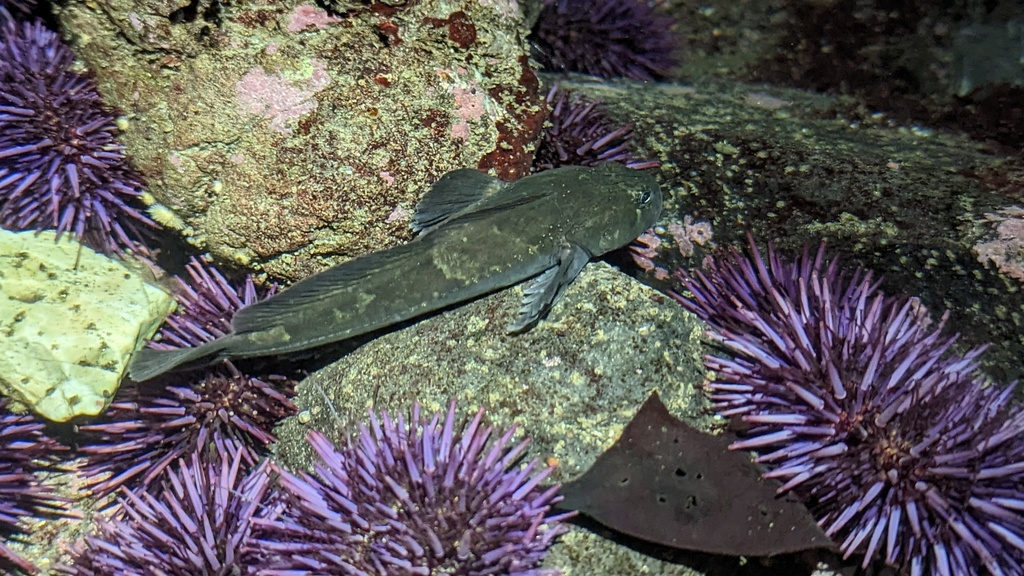
- Ascelichthys rhodorus

Scientific classification
- Kingdom: Animalia
- Phylum: Chordata
- Class: Actinopterygii
- Order: Perciformes
- Suborder: Cottoidei
- Superfamily: Cottoidea
- Family: Psychrolutidae
- Genus: Ascelichthys; D. S. Jordan & C. H. Gilbert, 1880
- Species: A. rhodorus

Binomial name
- Ascelichthys rhodorus D. S. Jordan & C. H. Gilbert, 1880

= Rosylip sculpin =

Species of fish

The rosylip sculpin (Ascelichthys rhodorus) is a species of marine ray-finned fish belonging to the family Cottidae, the typical sculpins. This species is found in the eastern Pacific Ocean from Alaska to central California where it is an inhabitant of tidepools and other intertidal environments. This species grows to a length of 15 centimetres (5.9 in) TL. This species is the only known member of its monospecific genus Ascelichthys.

== Taxonomy ==
The rosylip sculpin was first formally described in 1880 by the American ichthyologists David Starr Jordan and Charles Henry Gilbert with its type locality given as Neah Bay in Washington. Jordan and Gilbert classified their new species in a monospecific genus, Ascelichthys. The 5th edition of Fishes of the World classifies the genus Alcichthys within the subfamily Cottinae of the family Cottidae, however, other authors classify the genus within the subfamily Psychrolutinae of the family Psychrolutidae.

== Description ==
The rosylip sculpin has a rather robust body with a broad, compressed head, both of which are covered in scale-less, naked skin. The mouth is large and reaches back to ear the rear edge of the large eye. There are viliform teeth on the jaws, vomer and palatine. There is a simple, hooked spine on the preoperculum. The dorsal fins are supported by a total of between 7 and 10 spines and 17 and 20 soft rays while the anal fin is supported by between 13 and 16 soft rays. The caudal fin is rounded. The color is dark olive with greenish tints with white saddle-like blotches along the back starting behind the head, although therse are typically rather indistinct. The belly is dusky, On most nduividuals the lips are reddish. This species reaches a maximum published total length of 15 cm (5.9 in).

== Distribution and habitat ==
The rosylip sculpin is found in the eastern Pacific Ocean along the western coast of North America from Sitka, Alaska south as far as San Mateo in central California. This is a species of the intertidal zone, living in tide pools in areas of rocky shore on exposed coasts. It can remain out of water under rocks or within algal growths and can breathe air when exposed by the falling tide.
