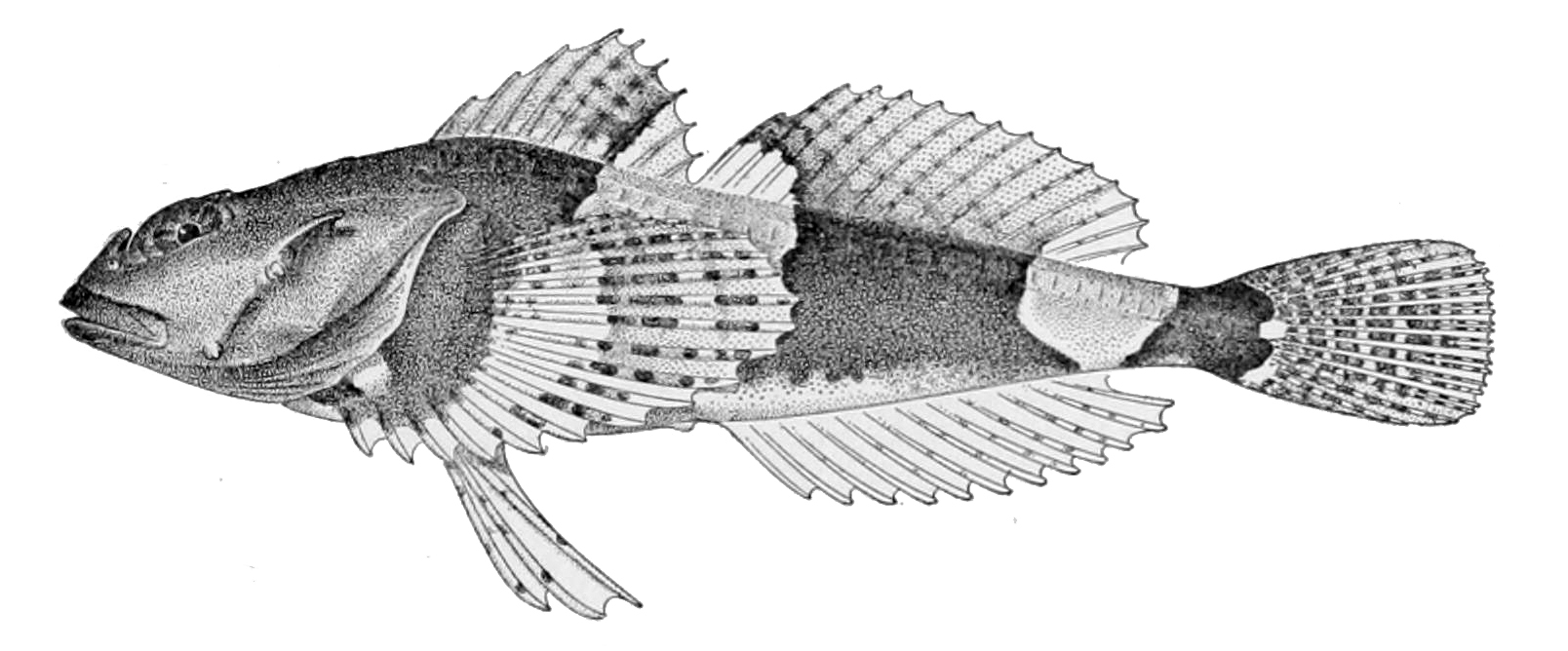
- Microcottus sellaris

Scientific classification
- Kingdom: Animalia
- Phylum: Chordata
- Class: Actinopterygii
- Order: Perciformes
- Suborder: Cottoidei
- Family: Psychrolutidae
- Genus: Microcottus; P. J. Schmidt, 1940

Type species
- Acanthocottus sellaris Gilbert 1896

= Microcottus =

Genus of fishes

Microcottus is a small genus of marine ray-finned fishes belonging to the family Cottidae, the typical sculpins. These fishes are found in the northern Pacific Ocean.

== Taxonomy ==
Microcottus was first proposed as a genus in 1940 by the Soviet zoologist Peter Schmidt with Acanthocottus sellaris as its type species by monotypy. A. sellaris has originally been described by Charles Henry Gilbert from Bristol Bay in Alaska. The 5th edition of Fishes of the World classifies this genus in the subfamily Cottinae of the family Cottidae but other authorities classify it in the subfamily Myoxocephalinae of the family Psychrolutidae, although others place the subfamily Myoxocephalinae within the Cottidae.

== Etymology ==
Microcottus prefixes Cottus, the type genus of the family Cottidae, with micro, meaning "small", alluding to the small size of M. sellaris in comparison to the related genus Myoxocephalus.

== Species ==
Microcottus is a small genus which contains 2 species:

- Microcottus matuaensis Yabe & Pietsch, 2003
- Microcottus sellaris (C. H. Gilbert, 1896) (Brightbelly sculpin)

== Characteristics ==
Microcottus sculpins are characterised by their pelvic fins having a wide connection to the belly by an inner membrane. They have prevomerine teeth but none on the palatine, The pores on the lateral line have two openings, On the preoperculum the top spine is recurved and the pelvic fins have a single spine and three soft rays. These are small sculpins, Microcottus sellaris has a maximum published total length of 13 cm (5.1 in) and M. matuaensis has a maximum published standard length of 8.1 cm (3.2 in).

== Distribution and habitat ==
Microcottus sculpins are found in the North Pacific. M. sellaris is distributed from off the Sea of Okhotsk coast of Hokkaido to the northern Sea of Japan into the Bering Sea. M. matuensis has so far proved to be endemic to the Kuril Islands. These fishes are found in the intertidal and subtidal zones and may be found in rivers as the larvae and fry are swept into them by the tide.
