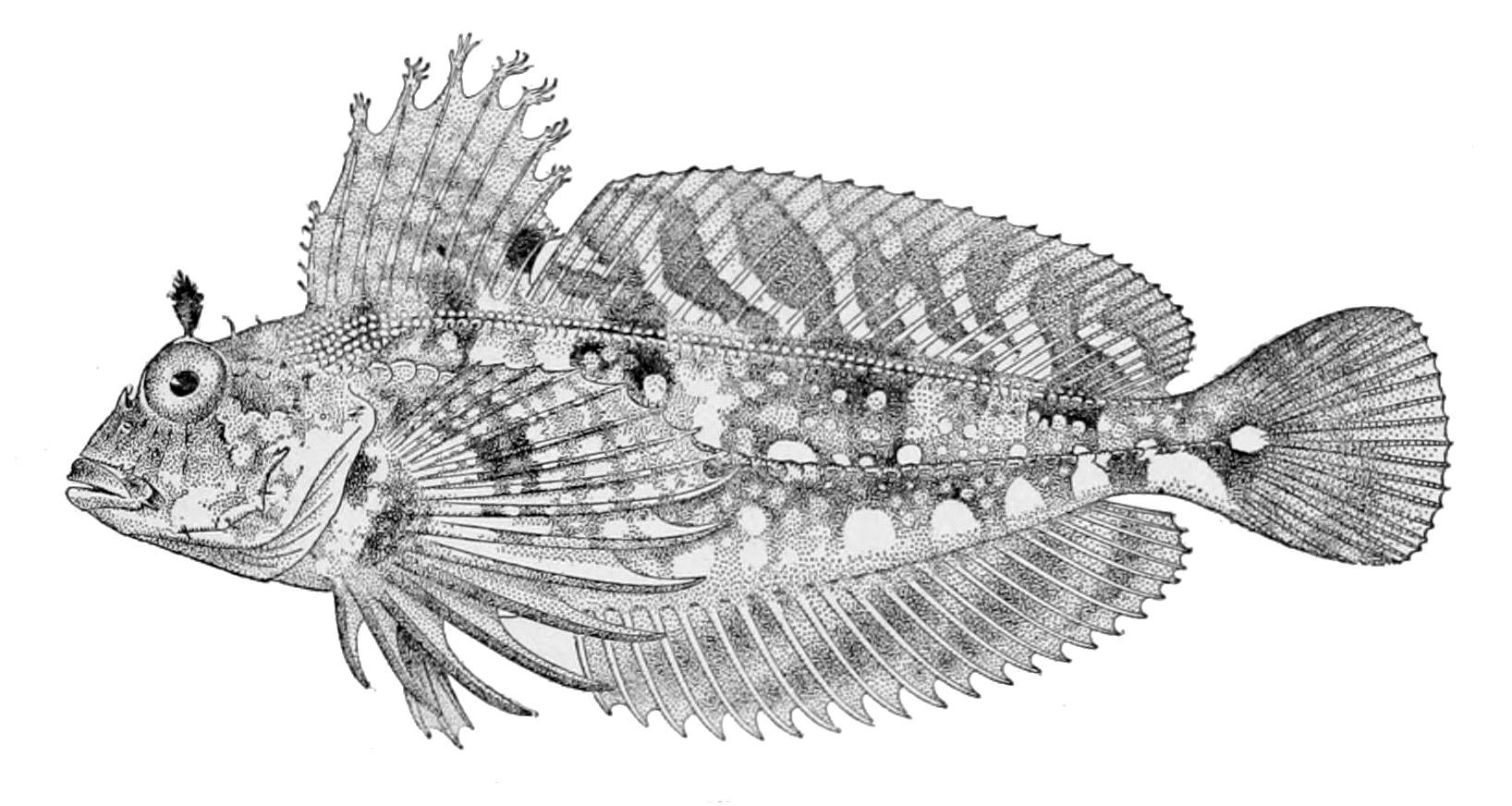
- Scaled sculpin (A. biseriatus)

Scientific classification
- Kingdom: Animalia
- Phylum: Chordata
- Class: Actinopterygii
- Order: Perciformes
- Suborder: Cottoidei
- Family: Psychrolutidae
- Genus: Archistes; Jordan & Gilbert, 1898

Type species
- Archistes plumarius Jordan & Gilbert, 1898

Synonyms
- Archaulus Gilbert & Burke, 1912

= Archistes =

Genus of fishes

Archistes is a genus of marine ray-finned fishes belonging to the family Cottidae, the typical sculpins. the two species in this genus are found in the northern Pacific Ocean.

== Taxonomy ==
Archistes was first proposed as a monospecific genus in 1898 by the American ichthyologist David Starr Jordan and Charles Henry Gilbert when they described Archistes plumarius, from Ushishir in the Kurils, as its only species and designated as its type species. The 5th edition of Fishes of the World classifies the genus Artediellus within the subfamily Cottinae of the family Cottidae, however, other authors classify the genus within the subfamily Psychrolutinae of the family Psychrolutidae.

== Species ==
There are currently two recognized species in this genus:

- Archistes biseriatus (Gilbert & Burke, 1912) (Scaled sculpin)
- Archistes plumarius Jordan & Gilbert, 1898 (Plumed sculpin)
