= Lepidobero =

Scientific classification
- Kingdom: Animalia
- Phylum: Chordata
- Class: Actinopterygii
- Order: Perciformes
- Suborder: Cottoidei
- Superfamily: Cottoidea
- Family: Psychrolutidae
- Genus: Lepidobero; K. J. Qin & X. B. Jin, 1992
- Species: L. sinensis

Binomial name
- Lepidobero sinensis K. J. Qin & X. B. Jin, 1992

Genus of fish

Lepidobero is a monospecific genus of freshwater ray-finned fish belonging to the family Cottidae, the typical sculpins. Its only species is Lepidobero sinensis which is endemic to China.

Lepidobero was first proposed as a genus in 1992 by the Chinese biologists in Qin Ke-Jing and Jin Xin-Bo when they described its only species Lepidobero sinensis with its type locality given as Hei-Shi-Jiao, Dalian in Liaoning. This taxon is placed in the family Cottidae by some authorities, while others place it in the subfamily Psychrolutinae of the family Psychrolutidae.
