= Andriyashev largeheaded sculpin =

Scientific classification
- Kingdom: Animalia
- Phylum: Chordata
- Class: Actinopterygii
- Order: Perciformes
- Suborder: Cottoidei
- Superfamily: Cottoidea
- Family: Psychrolutidae
- Genus: Andriashevicottus; Fedorov, 1990
- Species: A. megacephalus

Binomial name
- Andriashevicottus megacephalus Fedorov, 1990

Genus of fishes

The Andriyashev largeheaded sculpin (Andriashevicottus megacephalus) is a species of marine ray-finned fish belonging to the family Cottidae, the typical sculpins. This species is found in the northwestern Pacific Ocean. This monospecific genus, and therefore this species, are known from a single specimen, the holotype. This was collected from off Simushir Island in the Kuril Islands at a depth of 100 metres (330 ft). That specimen had a total length of 23.6 cm (9.3 in) long. FishBase classifies this taxon within the Cottidae but other authorities classify it within the subfamily Psychrolutinae of the family Psychrolutidae. The genus name Andriashevicottus includes a patronym, the person honoured was not identified by the describer Fedorov, however, it is almost certainly the Soviet ichthyologist Anatoly Petrovich Andriashev, the patronym is suffixed with Cottus, the type genus of the family Cottidae. The specific name megacephalus means "big head".
