= Spineless sculpin =

Scientific classification
- Kingdom: Animalia
- Phylum: Chordata
- Class: Actinopterygii
- Order: Perciformes
- Suborder: Cottoidei
- Family: Psychrolutidae
- Genus: Phallocottus; Schultz, 1938
- Species: P. obtusus

Binomial name
- Phallocottus obtusus Schultz, 1938

Species of fish

The spineless sculpin (Phallocottus obtusus) is a species of marine ray-finned fish belonging to the family Cottidae, the typical sculpins. This species is found in the Pacific Ocean where it is endemic to the waters around the Aleutian Islands, Alaska.

== Taxonomy ==
The spineless sculpin was first formally described in 1938 by the American ichthyologist Leonard Peter Schultz with its type locality given as Igitkin Island. Schultz classified the spineless sculpin in the new monospecific genus Phallocottus. The 5th edition of Fishes of the World classifies this genus within the subfamily Cottinae of the family Cottidae, however, other authors classify the genus within the subfamily Psychrolutinae of the family Psychrolutidae.

== Etymology ==
The spineless sculpin's genus name prefixes the name of the type genus of the Cottidae, Cottus with phallos, which means "penis". This is an allusion to the conical papillae at the anus. The specific name obtusus means "blunt" and is a reference to rather blunt and rounded spine on the preoperculum.

== Description ==
The spineless sculpin was classified in its own monotypic genus because it differs from related genera by having a combination of no teeth on the palatine and having an arched lateral line with smooth skin, a short, rounded blunt preopercular spine and the gill membranes are broadly joined across the throat. The position of the anus, closer to the pelvic fins than the anal fin, is also a distinguishing character.

== Distribution and habitat ==
The spineless sculpin is found in the North Pacific Ocean where it is only known from the waters around the Aleutian Islands. It is a demersal fish that occurs at depths of from 0 to 150 m (0 to 492 ft).
