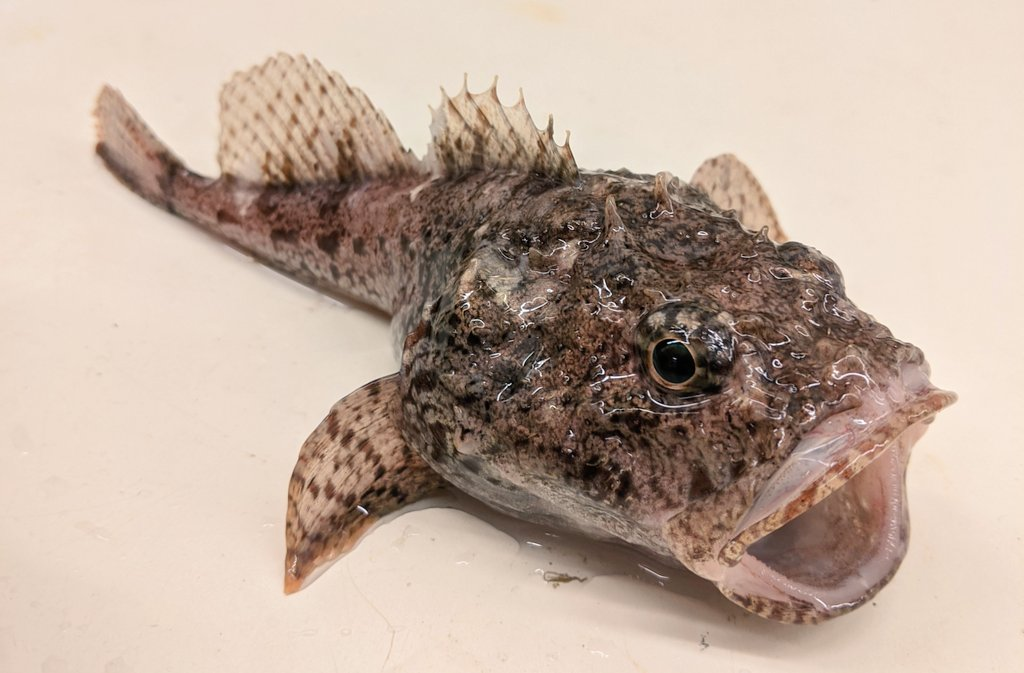

Scientific classification
- Kingdom: Animalia
- Phylum: Chordata
- Class: Actinopterygii
- Division: Teleostei
- Order: Perciformes
- Suborder: Cottoidei
- Family: Psychrolutidae
- Genus: Dasycottus; T. H. Bean, 1890
- Species: D. setiger

Binomial name
- Dasycottus setiger T. H. Bean, 1890

Synonyms
- Dasycottus japonicus Tanaka, 1914

= Spinyhead sculpin =

Species of fish

The spinyhead sculpin (Dasycottus setiger) is a species of marine ray-finned fish belonging to the family Psychrolutidae, the fatheads. This species is found in the northern Pacific Ocean. This species is the only species in the monospecific genus Dasycottus.

== Taxonomy ==
The spinyhead sculpin was first formally described in 1890 by the American ichthyologist Tarleton Hoffman Bean with its type locality given as off Sitkalidak Island in Alaska. Bean classified this new species in a new monospecific genus, Dasycottus. This genus is classified within the subfamily Psychrolutinae of the family Psychrolutidae.

== Etymology ==
The spinyhead sculpin's genus name prefixes Cottus, the type genus of the family Cottidae with dasys meaning "woolly", a reference to the cirri on the head and body which give this fish a bristly appearance. The specific name. setiger means "bearing hairs", another allusion to the cirri scattered over the head and body.

== Description ==
The spinyhead sculpin has its dorsal fins supported by 9 or 10 spines and between 13 and 15 soft rays while the anal fin contains 13 or 14 soft rays. The caudal fin is slightly rounded, the pectoral fins have a large base placed relatively anteriorly and the pelvic fins are small. The head and body is covered in scattered cirri giving it a bristly appearance and the larger specimens are the most bristly. This species reaches a maximum published total length of 73 cm (29 in) and a maximum published weight of 1.6 kg (3.5 lb).

== Distribution and habitat ==
The spinyhead sculpin is found in the northern Pacific Ocean from the Sea of Japan off Honshu north to the Navarin Canyon in the Bering Sea and then through the Aleutian Islands south to Washington. It occurs at depths of between 15 and 850 m (50 and 2,790 ft) on soft substrates.

== Biology ==
The spinyhead sculpin is a demersal fish and feeds on crustaceans caught swimming near the bottom. This species is known to live for up to 11 years.
