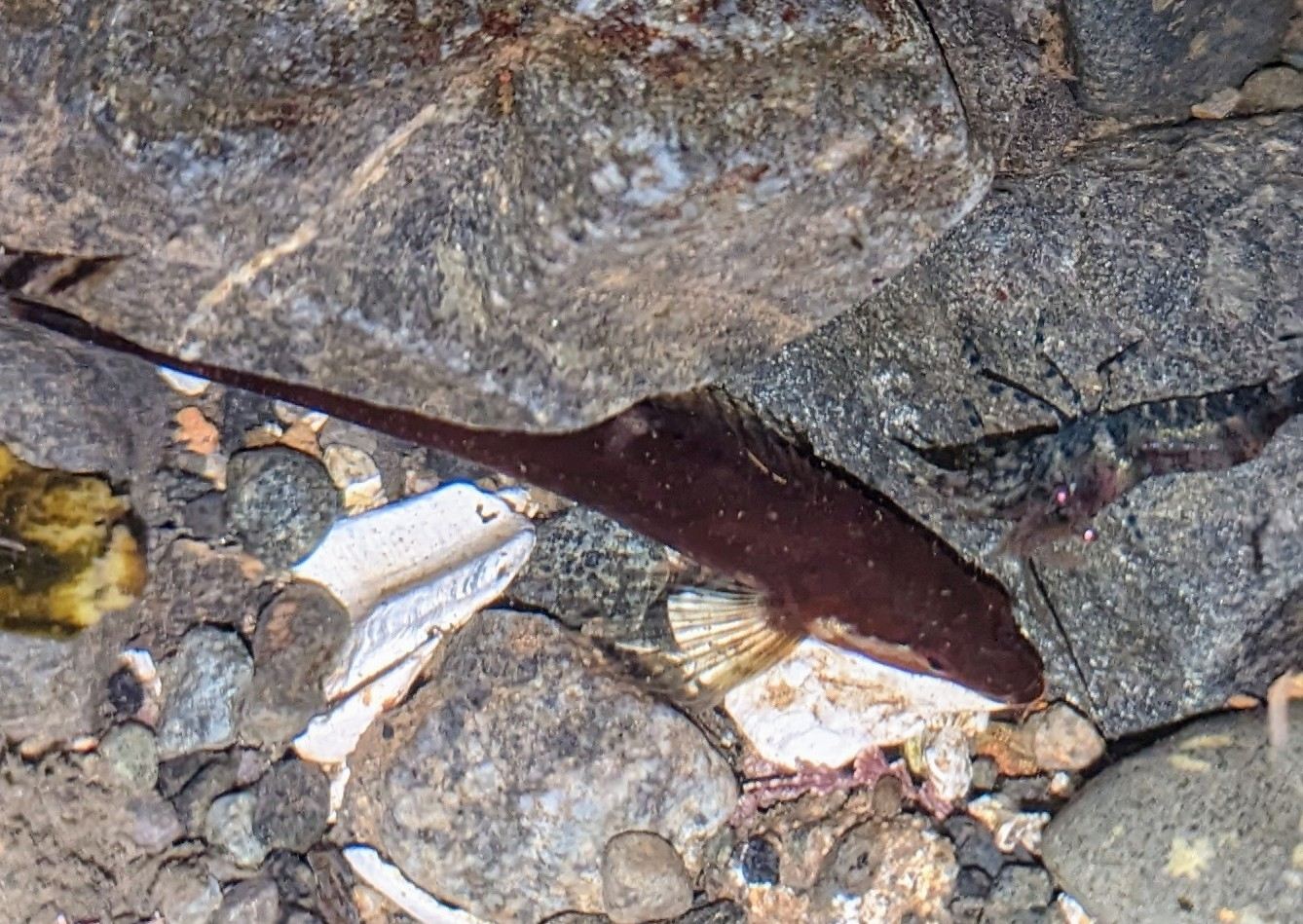
- Victoria, British Columbia

Scientific classification
- Kingdom: Animalia
- Phylum: Chordata
- Class: Actinopterygii
- Order: Perciformes
- Suborder: Cottoidei
- Superfamily: Cottoidea
- Family: Psychrolutidae
- Genus: Synchirus; T. H. Bean, 1890
- Species: S. gilli

Binomial name
- Synchirus gilli T. H. Bean, 1890

= Manacled sculpin =

Species of fish

The manacled sculpin (Synchirus gilli) is a species of marine ray-finned fish belonging to the family Cottidae, the typical sculpins. This fish is found in the eastern Pacific Ocean where it occurs along the coast from Alaska to southern California. This species grows to a length of 7 centimetres (2.8 in) TL. This species is the only known member of its genus. Their common name comes from their fused pectoral fins, as if “manacled” together.
