= Blackfin hookear sculpin =

Blackfin hookear sculpin Temporal range: Middle Miocene to present

Conservation status
- Least Concern (IUCN 3.1)

Scientific classification
- Kingdom: Animalia
- Phylum: Chordata
- Class: Actinopterygii
- Order: Perciformes
- Suborder: Cottoidei
- Superfamily: Cottoidea
- Family: Psychrolutidae
- Genus: Artediellichthys; Fedorov, 1973
- Species: A. nigripinnis

Binomial name
- Artediellichthys nigripinnis (P. J. Schmidt, 1937)

Synonyms
- Artediellus nigripinnis Schmidt, 1937

Species of fish

The Blackfin hookear sculpin (Artediellichthys nigripinnis) is a species of marine ray-finned fish belonging to the family Cottidae, the typical sculpins. It is the only extant species in the monospecific genus Artediellichthys. This species is found in the northern Pacific Ocean. It occurs at depths of from 200 to 815 metres (656 to 2,674 ft). This species grows to a total length of 13.7 cm (5.4 in). A fossil relative, †Artediellichthys candelabrum Nazarkin, 2019 is known from the Middle Miocene of Sakhalin, Russia.

The blackfin hookear sculpin was first formally described as Artediellus nigripinnis in 1937 by the Soviet zoologist Peter Schmidt with its type locality given as between St. Jona Island and the western coast of the Kamchatka Peninsula in the Sea of Okhotsk. In 1973 Vladimir Vladimirovich Fedorov reclassified the species in the monospecific genus Artediellichthys. he 5th edition of Fishes of the World classifies this genus in the subfamily Cottinae of the family Cottidae but other authorities classify it in the subfamily Psychrolutinae of the family Psychrolutidae.
