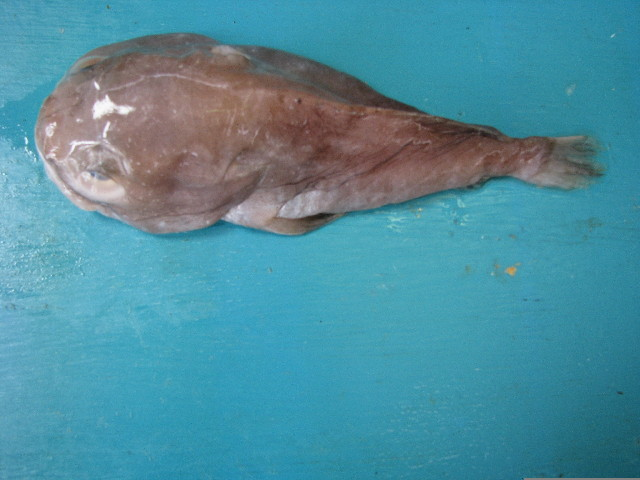
- E. costaecanariae

Scientific classification
- Kingdom: Animalia
- Phylum: Chordata
- Class: Actinopterygii
- Order: Perciformes
- Suborder: Cottoidei
- Family: Psychrolutidae
- Genus: Ebinania; Sakamoto, 1932

Type species
- Ebinania vermiculata Sakamoto, 1932

= Ebinania =

Genus of fishes

Ebinania is a genus of marine ray-finned fishes belonging to the family Psychrolutidae, the fatheads. These fishes are found in the Southern, Indian, Pacific and Atlantic Oceans.

== Description ==
Ebinania is distinguished from other Psychrolutidae due to their thin, flexible orbital rim. Other features include prevomerine teeth.

== Species ==
There are currently seven recognized species in this genus:

- Ebinania australiae Keith L. Jackson & J. S. Nelson, 2006

Ebinania australiae was first discovered in 2006 off of the coast of southern Australia in a collection of 9 specimens. 8 of the specimens were found along the areas of Tasmania whereas the 9th sample were found near Perth, Southwest Australia. The species' appearance has a cirri on the head, durable thin and flexible orbital rims, cranial (frontal) arch 3 high and twisted upwards, prevomerine teeth in a continuous band, a single terminal chin pore, obsolete lateral line pores, and a pale color throughout the body.

- Ebinania brephocephala (D. S. Jordan & Starks, 1903)
- Ebinania costaecanariae (Cervigón, 1961)

Ebinania costaecanariae is distinct from the other Ebinania species due to their dark pigmentation and vast geographic range. These species can be found from northern Spain to Southern Africa.

- Ebinania gyrinoides (M. C. W. Weber, 1913)
- Ebinania macquariensis J. S. Nelson, 1982 (Macquarie blobfish)
- Ebinania malacocephala J. S. Nelson, 1982
- Ebinania vermiculata Sakamoto, 1932
