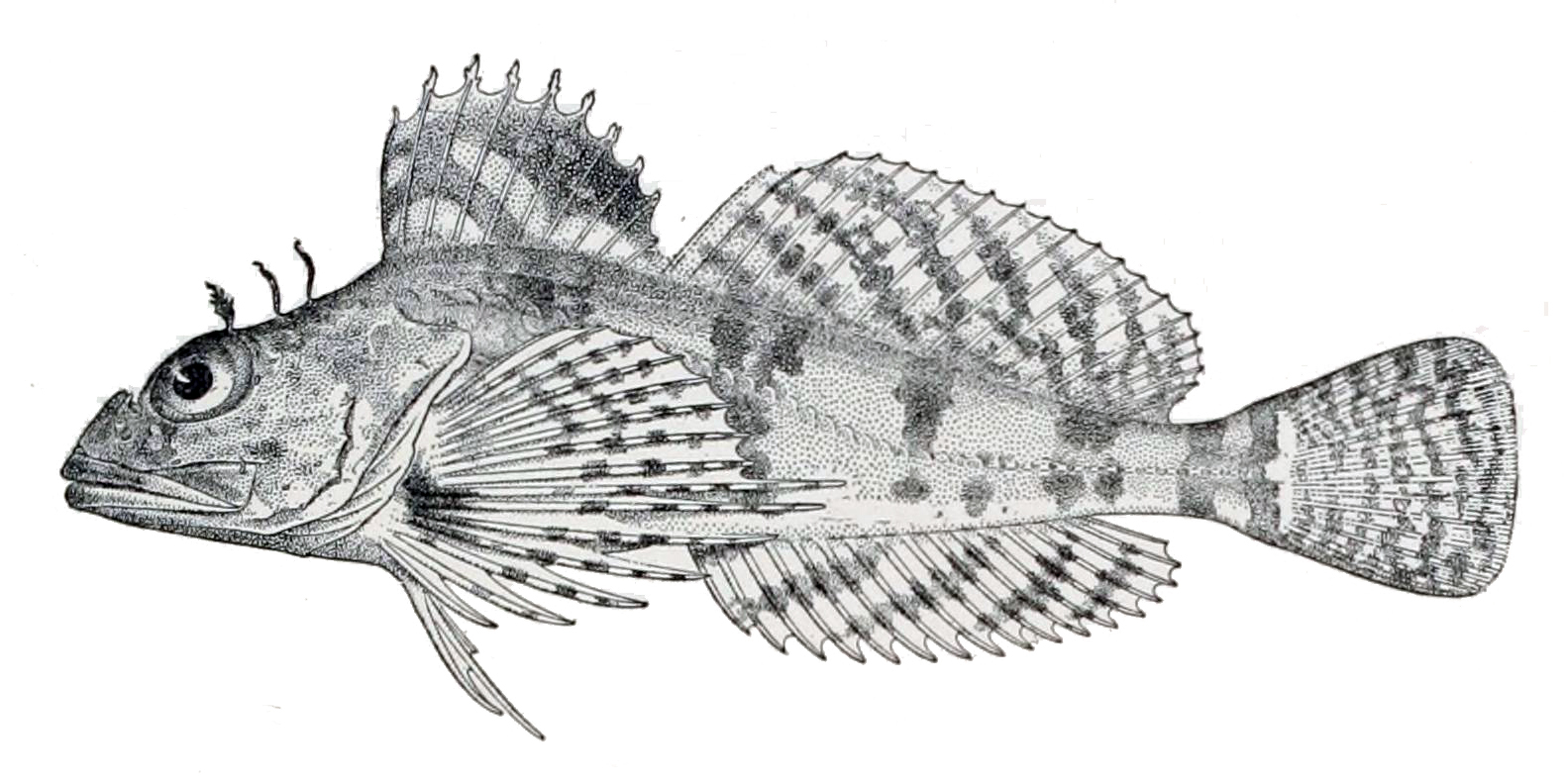

Scientific classification
- Kingdom: Animalia
- Phylum: Chordata
- Class: Actinopterygii
- Order: Perciformes
- Suborder: Cottoidei
- Superfamily: Cottoidea
- Family: Psychrolutidae
- Genus: Thyriscus; Gilbert & Burke, 1912
- Species: T. anoplus

Binomial name
- Thyriscus anoplus Gilbert & Burke, 1912

= Sponge sculpin =

Species of fish

The sponge sculpin (Thyriscus anoplus) is a species of marine ray-finned fish belonging to the family Cottidae, the typical sculpins. It is the only species in the monospecific genus Thyriscus. This fish is found in the northern Pacific Ocean where it is found at depths from 100 to 800 m (330 to 2,620 ft) though usually in the range of 300 to 400 m (980 to 1,310 ft). This species grows to a maximum published total length of 14.5 cm (5.7 in).

The sponge sculpin was first formally described in 1912 by the American ichthyologists Charles Henry Gilbert and Charles Victor Burke with its type locality given as off Attu Island in the Bering Sea. Gilbert and Burke classified this species in the monospecific genus Thyriscus. The 5th edition of Fishes of the World classifies this genus in the subfamily Cottinae of the family Cottidae but other authorities classify it in the subfamily Psychrolutinae of the family Psychrolutidae.
