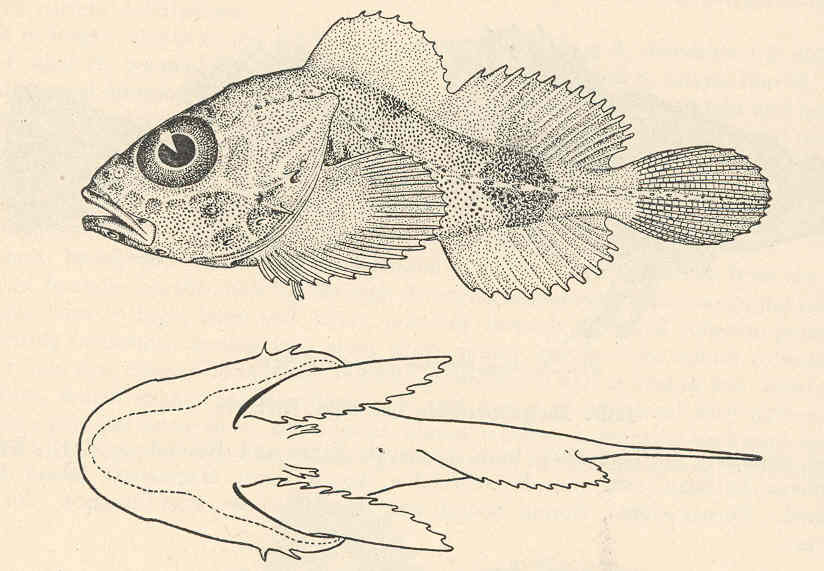

Scientific classification
- Kingdom: Animalia
- Phylum: Chordata
- Class: Actinopterygii
- Order: Perciformes
- Suborder: Cottoidei
- Family: Psychrolutidae
- Genus: Malacocottus; T. H. Bean, 1890

Type species
- Malacocottus zonurus T. H. Bean 1890

= Malacocottus =

Genus of fishes

Malacocottus is a genus of fatheads native to the northern Pacific Ocean. Malacocottus are typically occupied in the benthic zone near the bottom of the northern Pacific Ocean.

== Species ==
There are currently 4 recognized species in this genus:

- Malacocottus aleuticus (Smith,1904)
- Malacocottus gibber Ki. Sakamoto, 1930
- Malacocottus kincaidi C. H. Gilbert & J. C. Thompson, 1905 (Blackfin sculpin)
- Malacocottus zonurus T. H. Bean, 1890 (Darkfin sculpin)

FishBase recognizes 4 species in this genus but other authorities treat M. aleuticus as a synonym of M. zonurus.
