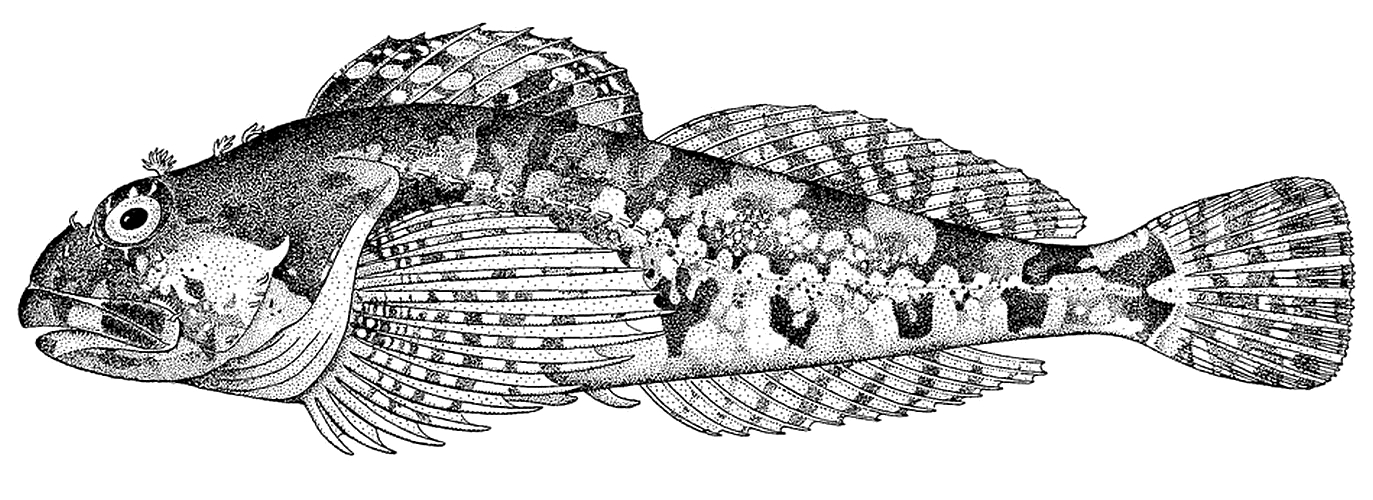

Scientific classification
- Kingdom: Animalia
- Phylum: Chordata
- Class: Actinopterygii
- Order: Perciformes
- Suborder: Cottoidei
- Superfamily: Cottoidea
- Family: Psychrolutidae
- Genus: Bero; D. S. Jordan & Starks, 1904
- Species: B. elegans

Binomial name
- Bero elegans (Steindachner, 1881)

Synonyms
- Centridermichthys elegans Steindachner, 1881

= Bero elegans =

Species of fish

Bero elegans is a species of marine ray-finned fish belonging to the family Cottidae, the typical sculpins. This species is found in the northwestern Pacific Ocean. This species grows to a length of 20 centimetres (7.9 in) TL. It is the only known member of the genus Bero.

== Taxonomy ==
Bero elegans was first formally described in 1881 by the Austrian ichthyologist Franz Steindachner with its type locality given as Strietok, near Vladivostok on the Sea of Japan. Steindachner classified the new species in the monospecific genus Bero. The 5th edition of Fishes of the World classifies the genus Bero within the subfamily Cottinae of the family Cottidae, however, other authors classify the genus within the subfamily Psychrolutinae of the family Psychrolutidae.

== Etymology ==
Bero is a local name for this fish at Aomori in Japan. The specific name elegans mean "elegant" or "refined", an allusion Steindachner did not explain but may be a reference to the coloration and pattern of this fish.

== Distribution ==
Bero elegans is found in the northwestern Pacific Ocean around northern Japan, Sakhalin and Peter the Great Bay.
