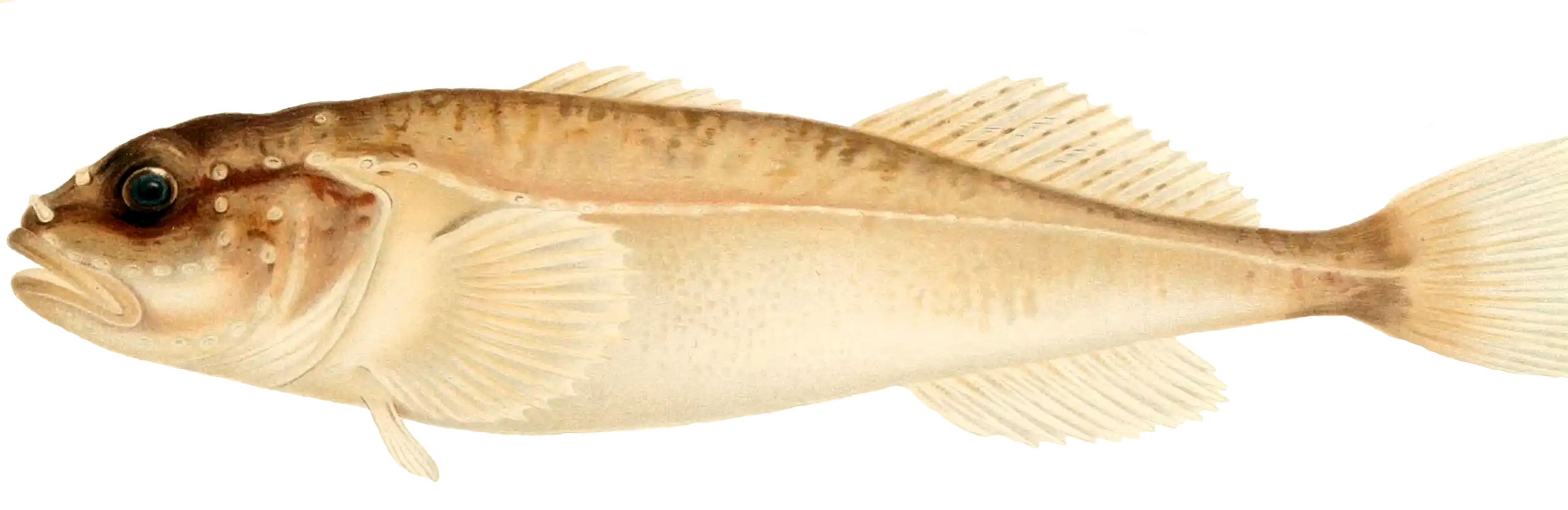
- Batrachocottus nikolskii

Scientific classification
- Kingdom: Animalia
- Phylum: Chordata
- Class: Actinopterygii
- Order: Perciformes
- Suborder: Cottoidei
- Family: Cottidae
- Genus: Batrachocottus; L. S. Berg, 1903

Type species
- Cottus baicalensis Dybowski, 1874

= Batrachocottus =

Genus of fishes

Batrachocottus is a genus of freshwater ray-finned fishes belonging to the family Cottidae, the typical sculpins. These fishes are endemic to the Lake Baikal watershed in Russia.

== Taxonomy ==
Batrachocottus was first proposed as a monospecific genus in 1903 by the Russian ichthyologist Lev Berg with Cottus baicalensis as its type species. This genus was not mentioned by the 5th edition of Fishes of the World and has been placed in the family Cottidae by some authorities. and in the subfamily Abyssocottinae by others. However, other authorities have used phylogenetic studies which have found that Baikal sculpins that were classified in the subfamilies Comephorinae and Abyssocottinae by Fishes of the World radiated from an ancestor which was likely to be within the genus Cottus and that the classification of the Baikal sculpins in a different taxon from Cottus was paraphyletic.

== Species ==
There are currently four recognized species in this genus:

- Batrachocottus baicalensis (Dybowski, 1874) (Bighead sculpin)
- Batrachocottus multiradiatus L. S. Berg, 1907
- Batrachocottus nikolskii (L. S. Berg, 1900) (Fat sculpin)
- Batrachocottus talievi Sideleva, 1999
