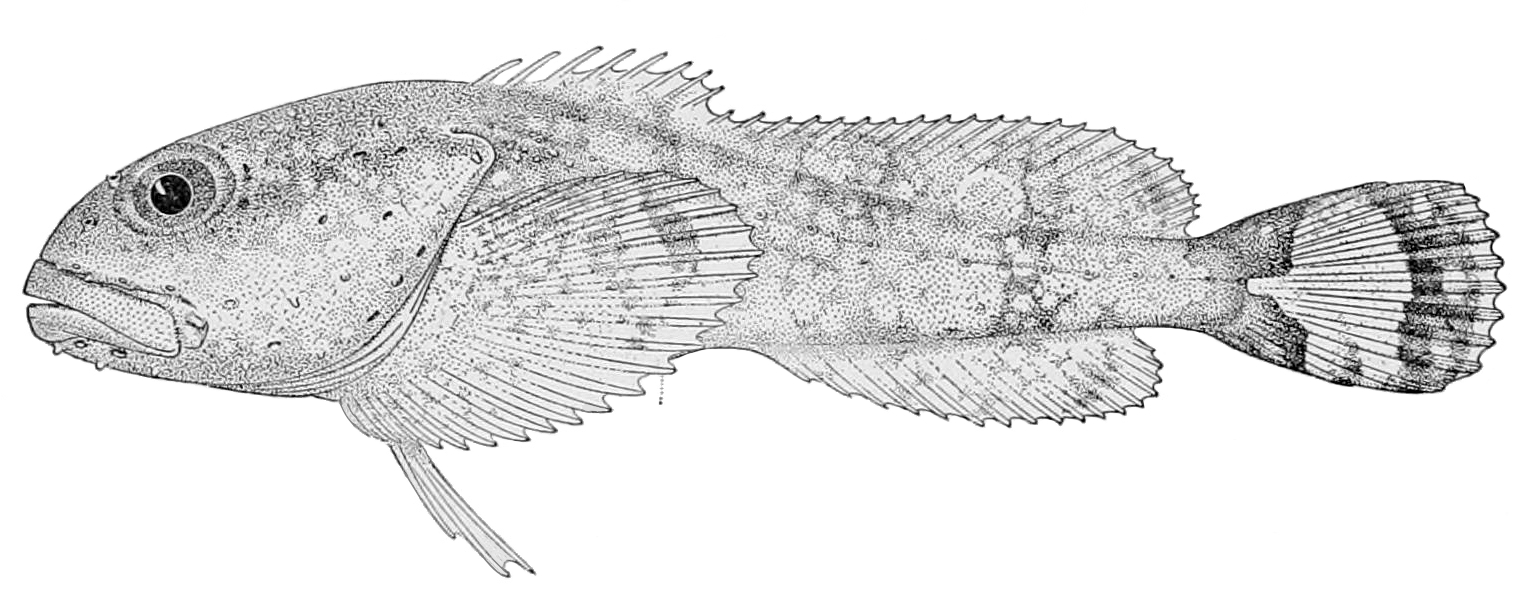
- Smoothcheek Sculpin (E. gyrinus)

Scientific classification
- Kingdom: Animalia
- Phylum: Chordata
- Class: Actinopterygii
- Order: Perciformes
- Suborder: Cottoidei
- Family: Psychrolutidae
- Genus: Eurymen; C. H. Gilbert & Burke, 1912

Type species
- Eurymen gyrinus Gilbert & Burke, 1912

= Eurymen =

Genus of fishes

Eurymen is a small genus of marine ray-finned fishes belonging to the family Psychrolutidae, the fatheads. These fishes are found in the northern Pacific Ocean.

== Species ==
There are currently two recognized species in this genus:

- Eurymen bassargini Lindberg, 1930
- Eurymen gyrinus C. H. Gilbert & Burke, 1912 (Smoothcheek sculpin)
