= Vladimir Soldatov =

Vladimir Konstantinovich Soldatov
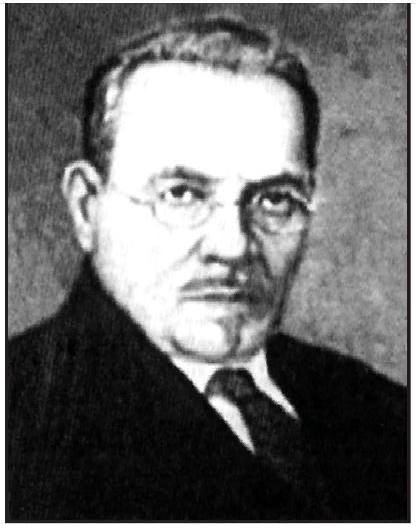
- Born: 15 July 1875; Verkholensk
- Died: 31 January 1941 (aged 65); Moscow
- Education: St. Petersburg University
- Known for: Marine zoology Hydrobiology; Fisheries science

Vladimir Konstantinovich Soldatov (Russian: Владимир Константинович Солдатов, 15 July 1875 – 31 January 1941) was a Russian and Soviet ichthyologist, zoologist, Doctor of Biological Sciences, and professor in the Department of Ichthyology of the Moscow Technical Institute for the Fishery Industry.

== Biography ==
Soldatov was born in the town of Verkholensk of the Irkutsk Governorate, in a family of folk teachers K. N. and E. D. Soldatov. From the age of one, he spent his childhood in the city of Irkutsk. From 1886 to 1896 he studied at the Irkutsk classical gymnasium. After graduating, Soldatov entered the Natural Science Department of the Faculty of Physics and Mathematics at St. Petersburg University in 1896. Soldatov participated in the Murmansk scientific and field expedition (1899–1906) organized by N. M. Knipovich. He studied the biology and fishing of salmon on the tonyas of Russian fishermen and Sámi people in the Kola Bay and rivers flowing into the Barents Sea. He graduated from the university in 1906. In 1907, he was sent by the Department of Agriculture to the Far East to study fish resources. He managed to organize a Far Eastern expedition, which from 1907 to 1913 conducted year-round research on the biology of the main commercial fish (primarily salmon and sturgeon) in the Amur River basin. The results of these scientific works were published in the monographs “Research on Amur salmon biology” (1912) and “Research on the Amur sturgeon” (1915), which experts rightly classify as classic works of scientific literature. In 1909, at the initiative of Soldatov, the first fish breeding plant for artificial salmon farming was built on Cape Bolshoi Chil, in the Amur basin and throughout the Far East. During his stay in the Far East, Soldatov collected vast information on hydrology, hydrobiology, and fish in the western part of the Sea of Okhotsk, Sakhalin Gulf, Strait of Tartary and Peter the Great Gulf. Soldatov described many new species and genera of fish in the Far East. Soldatov was a member of the Northern Scientific and Expedition Expedition (1920–1925). From 1919 to 1941 he was a professor at the Moscow Technical Institute of Fisheries and Agriculture. Soldatov was the author of a number of textbooks on ichthyology, including “Fish and Fisheries” (1928), “Commercial Ichthyology” (1934–1938), “General Ichthyology” (1934) and “Fish of the Fishing Regions of the USSR” (1938). His textbook “Commercial Ichthyology” served as a reference for many generations of ichthyology students.

He died on January 31, 1941, and was buried in Moscow at the Novodevichy Cemetery (2nd plot, 33rd row). Next to him are buried the wife of a doctor, Elena Petrovna Soldatova (1882–1948) and his brother, Leonid Konstantinovich Soldatov (1888–1963).

== Tribute ==
Many species of fish were named after Soldatov, including those that live in the waters of the Sea of Okhotsk, including:

- The Catfish Silurus soldatovi Nikolsky & Soin, 1948,
- Soldatov's gudgeon (Gobio soldatovi Lev Berg 1914),
- Soldatov's thicklip gudgeon (Sarcocheilichthys soldatovi Lev Berg 1914),
- Lycodes soldatovi Taranetz & Andriashev, 1935,
- The lumpfish Eumicrotremus soldatovi Popov, 1930,
- The eelpout Bothrocara soldatovi Bean, 1890,
- The Sea Squirt Aplidium soldatovi (Redikorzev, 1937),
- The Caddisfly Hydatophylax soldatovi (Martynov, 1914),
- The Ground Crab Spider Xysticus soldatovi Utochkin, 1968 from Russia and China

== Works ==
=== In Russian ===
- Железнодорожные поселки по Забайкальской линии (Railway villages along the Transbaikal line) : статистическое описание и материалы по переписи 1910 г. / В. Солдатов; с предисл. под ред. Д. М. Головачева. - Санкт-Петербург : Тип. АО "Слово", 1912. - 24 см. - (Труды командированной по высочайшему повелению Амурской экспедиции) Вып. 2 (Т. 5, ч. 1б): Таблицы, ч. 1б. - 1912. - (2), IV, С. 985-2059
- Разведение лососевых пород в Японии (Salmonidae Breeding in Japan): Отчет по командировке в Японию в 1911 г. - Санкт-Петербург : тип. В.Ф. Киршбаума, 1912. - [2], 95 с., 17 л. ил., карт.; 24. - (Главное управление землеустройства и земледелия. Департамент земледелия. Материалы к познанию русского рыболовства; 1912 г. Т. 1. Вып. 3).
- Обзор исследований, произведенный на Амуре в 1909-1913 год; Исследование осетровых Амура (A Review of Research Carried out on the Amur River in 1909–1913; Exploration of Amur Sturgeon)/ В.К. Солдатов. - Петроград : тип. В.Ф. Киршбаума (отд-ние), 1915. - [2], IV, 415 с., 24 л. ил. : ил.; 24. - (Главное управление землеустройства и земледелия. Департамент земледелия. Материалы к познанию русского рыболовства. Научно-промысловые исследования вод Дальнего Востока; Вып. 1 и 2; 1914 г. Т. 3. Вып. 12.).
- Материалы по ихтиофауне Карского и восточной части Баренцова морей по сборам экспедиции Института в 1921 г. : С прил. списка рыб, собранных в Карском море в 1921 г. зоологом И. А. Стрельниковым (Materials on the Ichthyofauna of the Kara and Eastern Parts of the Barents Sea from the Collections of the institute's Expedition in 1921: With the Appendix of the List of Fishes Collected in the Kara Sea in 1921 by Zoologist I. A. Strelnikov) / В. К. Солдатов. - Саратов : Б. и., 1923. - 80 с.; 35 см. - (Труды Пловучего морского института/ Рус. гидробиологич. журн.; [Т. 1], вып. 3).
- Рыбы р. Печоры (Fishes of the Pechora River): (Материалы ихтиол. исслед., произвед. при участии проф. С.А.Зернова и студентов Отд. рыбов. П. с.-х. акад.: М.С.Зернова, И.Л.Ловецкого и Н.С.Овсянникова) / Проф. В.К.Солдатов. - М.; Пг.: Тип. "Красный агитатор", 1924. - 74 с. : табл., диагр.; 26 см.. - ((Тр.) НТО ВСНХ; № 6). - (Тр. Сев. науч.-пром. экспедиции; Вып.17)
- Рыбы и рыбный промысел (Fishes and Fisheries) : Курс частной ихтиологии... / В. К. Солдатов проф. Тимирязевской с.-х. акад. - Москва; Ленинград : Гос. изд-во, 1928 (М. : тип. "Красный пролетарий"). - XV, 320 с. : ил.; 26х18 см.
- Обзор рыб дальневосточных морей (A Review of Fishes in the Far Eastern Seas) / Проф. В. К. Солдатов, проф. Г. У. Линдберг. - Владивосток : Типо-лит. им. т. Волина, 1930. - XLVII, 576 с., 16 с. ил. : ил.; 26х18 см. - (Известия Тихоокеанского научного института рыбного хозяйства/ РСФСР-Наркомторг. Под ред. проф. А. Н. Державина...; Т. 5).
- Промысловая ихтиология (Commercial Ichthyology): Допущен Наркомснабом СССР в качестве учеб. пособия для втузов / Проф. В. К. Солдатов. - Москва; Ленинград : Снабтехиздат, 1934-1938 (М. : ф-ка книги "Кр. пролетарий" и тип. Профиздата). - 2 т.; 23х15 см.

=== In English ===
- On the new genus Cyclopteropsis (Pisces Cyclopteridae) from the Okhotsk sea / V. Soldatov and A. Popov. - [Ленинград] : [б. и.], 1929. - [4] с. вкл. ил.; 26 см
- On a new genus and species of the family Zoarcidae (Pisces) from the Okhotsk sea / By V. Soldatov and G. Lindberg. - [Ленинград] : [б. и.], [1929]. - [4] с. вкл. ил.; 23 см.

== Taxon described by him ==
- See Category:Taxa named by Vladimir Soldatov
