= Rolf Ling Bolin =

American academic ichthyologist (1901-1973)

Rolf Ling Bolin (22 March 1901 – 23 August 1973) was an American academic ichthyologist. A genus of lanternfish, Bolinichthys, is named for him.

== Biography ==
Bolin was born on 22 March 1901 in New York City to Scandinavian American parents. He initially pursued a career in graphic arts, but then took courses in marine biology. Bolin was awarded a Ph.D. from Stanford University in 1934, and worked at Hopkins Marine Station in Pacific Grove of Monterey County, California. There he was sought for information on fishes from Ed Ricketts and John Steinbeck. He was appointed Professor of Marine Biology and Oceanography in 1949 at Stanford, where he worked until his retirement in 1967. Bolin died on 23 August 1973 in Carmel, California.

== Taxon described by him ==
- See Category:Taxa named by Rolf Ling Bolin

== Taxon named in his honor ==
- Notoscopelus bolini Nafpaktitis, 1975 is a species of lanternfish in the family Myctophidae that was named after him.
