= Edwin Chapin Starks =

American ichthyologist

- Born: Baraboo, Wisconsin
- Education: Stanford University
- Scientific career
- Fields: Ichthyology
- Workplaces: Stanford University

Edwin Chapin Starks (born in Baraboo, Wisconsin on January 25, 1867; died December 29, 1932) was an American ichthyologist most associated with Stanford University. He was known as an authority on the osteology of fish. He also did studies of fish of the Puget Sound. His wife, Chloe Lesley Starks, an artist and scientific illustrator, and daughter, Dorothy Rich, a radiologist, were also both involved in science.

== See also ==
- Category:Taxa named by Edwin Chapin Starks
