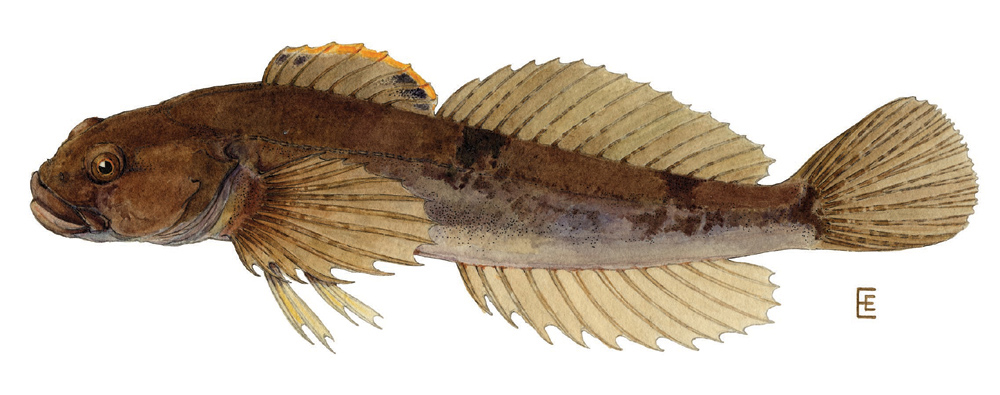
- Cottus cognatus

Scientific classification
- Kingdom: Animalia
- Phylum: Chordata
- Class: Actinopterygii
- Division: Teleostei
- Order: Perciformes
- Suborder: Cottoidei
- Superfamily: Cottoidea
- Family: Cottidae; Bonaparte, 1831

Subfamilies and genera
- see text

Synonyms
- Abyssocottinae Berg, 1907; Cottinae Bonaparte, 1831

= Cottidae =

Cottidae Temporal range: Early Oligocene–recent

Family of ray-finned fishes

The Cottidae are a family of fish in the superfamily Cottoidea, the sculpins. Following major taxonomic revisions, it contains about 118 species in 18 genera, the vast majority of which are either restricted to freshwater habitats or are amphidromous. They are referred to simply as cottids to avoid confusion with sculpins of other families.

Cottids are distributed throughout the Northern Hemisphere, especially in boreal and colder temperate climates. They are especially diverse in Lake Baikal and surrounding river basins. Only a few cottids inhabit marine habitats. Other sculpins restricted to marine habitats are now placed in the family Psychrolutidae. In Lake Baikal, many cottids live in deep water, below 170 m (560 ft). There are 24 known species in seven genera. These include, for instance, Abyssocottus korotneffi and Cottinella boulengeri which are among the deepest-living freshwater fish. Baikal is the deepest lake on Earth (1,642 m or 5,387 ft) and sculpins occupy even its greatest depths.

Most cottids are small fish, under 10 cm (3.9 in) in length.

The earliest known skeletal remains of cottids are of Cottus cervicornis (taxonomy uncertain) from the Early Oligocene of Belgium. Cottids become more common in the fossil record from the Miocene onwards.

== Taxonomy ==
The Cottidae was first recognised as a taxonomic grouping by the French zoologist Charles Lucien Bonaparte in 1831. The composition of the family and its taxonomic relationships have been the subject of some debate among taxonomists. The 5th edition of Fishes of the World retains a rather conservative classification, although it includes the families Comephoridae and Abbyssocottidae as subfamilies of the Cottidae recognising that these taxa are very closely related to some of the freshwater sculpins in the genus Cottus. More recently, phylogenetic studies have redefined Cottidae to be largely restricted to the freshwater sculpins, i.e. Cottus, Leptocottus, Mesocottus, Trachidermus, and the species flock in and around Lake Baikal, and the marine genera are placed in the Psychrolutidae. Eschmeyer's Catalog of Fishes follows this classification.

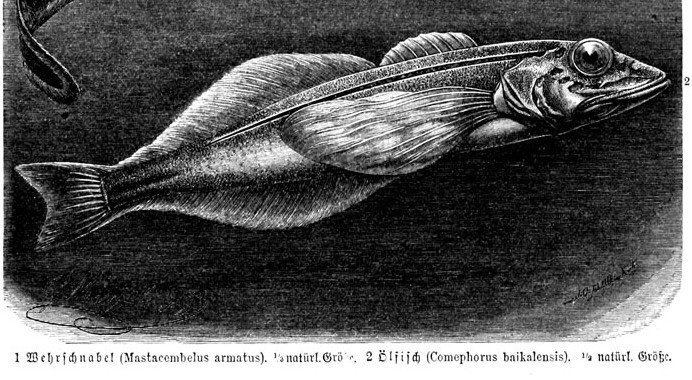
Comephorus baikalensis

Based on Eschmeyer's Catalog of Fishes (2026):

- Family Cottidae Bonaparte, 1831
  - Genus Abyssocottus Berg, 1906
  - Genus Alpinocottus Bogdanov, 2023
  - Genus Asprocottus Berg, 1906
  - Genus Batrachocottus Berg, 1903
  - Genus Comephorus Lacépède, 1800
  - Genus Cottinella Berg, 1907
  - Genus Cottocomephorus Pellegrin, 1900
  - Genus Cottus Linnaeus, 1758
  - Genus Cyphocottus Sideleva, 2003
  - Genus †Kerocottus Kimmel, 1975 (fossil; late Neogene of Oregon, USA)
  - Genus Leocottus Palmer, 1961
  - Genus Leptocottus Girard, 1854
  - Genus Limnocottus Berg, 1906
  - Genus Mesocottus Gratzianov, 1907
  - Genus Neocottus Sideleva, 1982
  - Genus Paracottus Taliev, 1949
  - Genus Procottus Gratzianov, 1902
  - Genus Rheopresbe Jordan & Starks, 1904
  - Genus Trachidermis Heckel, 1837

=== Evolution ===
Molecular studies based on mitochondrial DNA suggest that the Lake Baikal cottids, previously placed in the subfamilies Abyssocottinae, Cottocomephorinae & Comephorinae (Baikal oilfish), together make a monophyletic group that has originated and diversified within the lake relative recently, since the Pliocene. The ancestors of this species flock comprising more than 30 species belonged to the widespread freshwater sculpin genus Cottus (in Cottidae). The Abyssocottidae itself appears as a natural group within this radiation, except that also the genus Batrachocottus should be included.

== See also ==
- List of fish families
