= List of fishes of the Salish Sea =

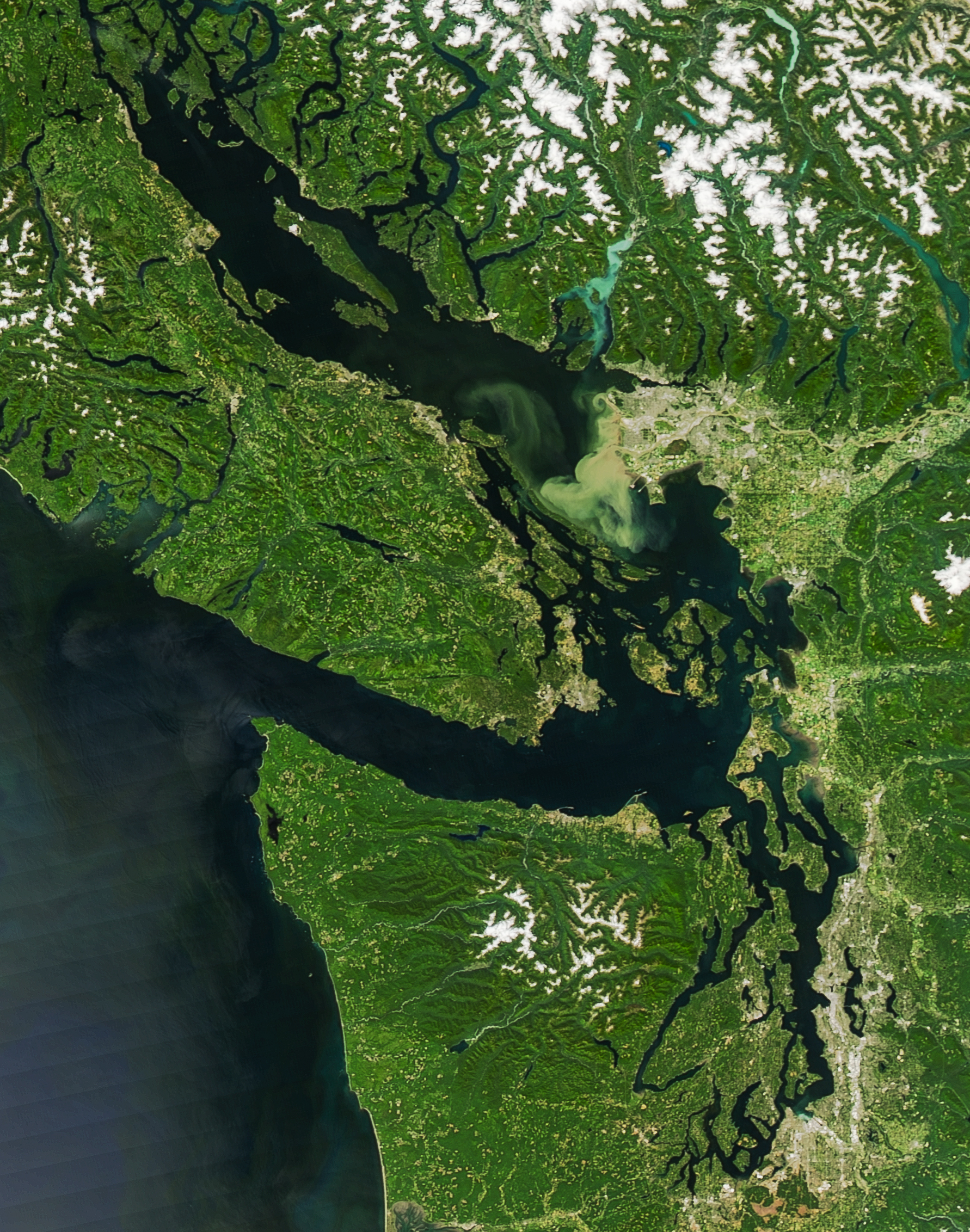
The Salish Sea, showing the Strait of Georgia near centre, the Strait of Juan de Fuca below, Puget Sound at the lower right, Johnstone Strait at the extreme upper left, and the Pacific Ocean at lower left. Sediment from the Fraser River is visible as a greenish plume in the Strait of Georgia.

There are at least 253 identified species of fish known to inhabit the marine and brackish regions of the Salish Sea. Species are listed by common name, scientific name, typical occurrence within the Salish Seas regions.

Salish Sea regions: JF=Strait of Juan de Fuca; SJ=San Juan Islands; BB=Bellingham Bay; SG=southern Strait of Georgia; NG=northern Strait of Georgia; NS=northern Puget Sound; SS=southern Puget Sound; HC=Hood Canal.

== Myxiniformes (hagfish) ==
=== Myxinidae ===
- Pacific hagfish, Eptatretus stoutii, JF

== Petromyzontiformes (lampreys) ==
=== Petromyzontidae ===
- Pacific lamprey, Entosphenus tridentatus, JF SJ BB SG NG NS SS HC
- Western river lamprey, Lampetra ayresii, SJ BB SG NS

== Chimaeriformes (ratfish) ==
=== Chimaeridae ===
- Spotted ratfish, Hydrolagus colliei, JF SJ BB SG NG NS SS HC

== Lamniformes (mackerel sharks) ==
=== Alopiidae (thresher sharks) ===
- Common thresher shark, Alopias vulpinus, JF SJ

=== Cetorhinidae (basking sharks) ===
- Basking shark, Cetorhinus maximus SJ, SG, NS, SS

=== Lamnidae (mackerel sharks) ===
- Great white shark, Carcharodon carcharias, JF NS
- Salmon shark, Lamna ditropis, JF SJ SG NG NS

== Carcharhiniformes (Ground sharks) ==
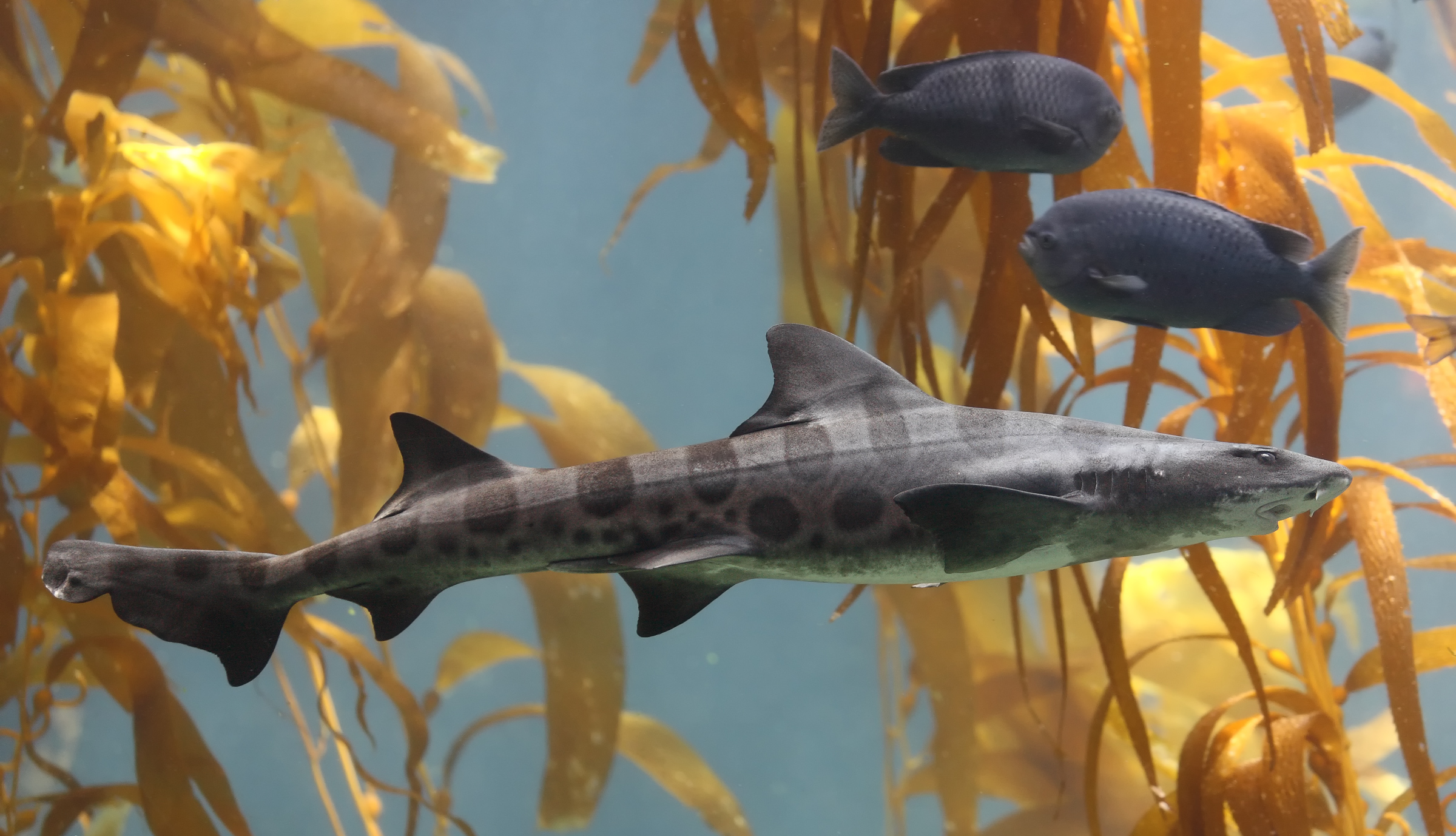
Leopard shark

=== Scyliorhinidae (cat sharks) ===
- Brown catshark, Apristurus brunneus, SJ SG NS SS HC

=== Triakidae (hound sharks) ===
- Soupfin shark, Galeorhinus galeus, SS
- Leopard shark, Triakis semifasciata, BB

=== Carcharhinidae (requiem sharks) ===
- Blue shark, Prionace glauca, NS

== Hexanchiformes (six-gill sharks) ==
=== Hexanchidae (cow sharks) ===
- Bluntnose sixgill shark, Hexanchus griseus, JF SJ BB SG NG NS SS HC
- Broadnose sevengill shark, Notorynchus cepedianus, SG SS

== Squaliformes (dogfish sharks) ==
=== Squalidae (dogfish sharks) ===
- Pacific spiny dogfish, Squalus suckleyi, JF SJ BB SG NG NS SS HC

=== Somniosidae (sleeper sharks) ===
- Pacific sleeper shark, Somniosus pacificus, JF SJ NG NS

== Squatiniformes (angel sharks) ==
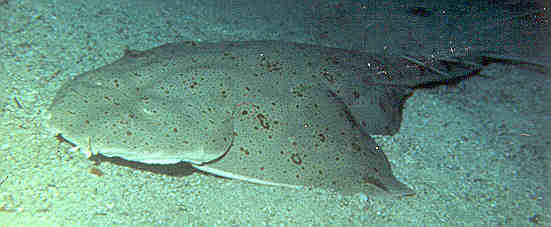
Pacific angelshark

=== Squatinidae ===
- Pacific angelshark, Squatina californica, NS

== Torpediniformes (electric rays) ==
=== Torpedinidae ===
- Pacific electric ray, Torpedo californica, JF BB SG NS SS HC

== Rajiformes (skates) ==
=== Rajidae ===
- Bering skate, Bathyraja interrupta, SG
- Sandpaper skate, Bathyraja kincaidii, JF SJ SG
- Big skate, Beringraja binoculata, JF SJ BB SG NG NS SS HC
- California skate, Raja inornata, JF
- Longnose skate, Raja rhina, JF SJ BB SG NG NS SS HC

== Acipenseriformes (sturgeons) ==
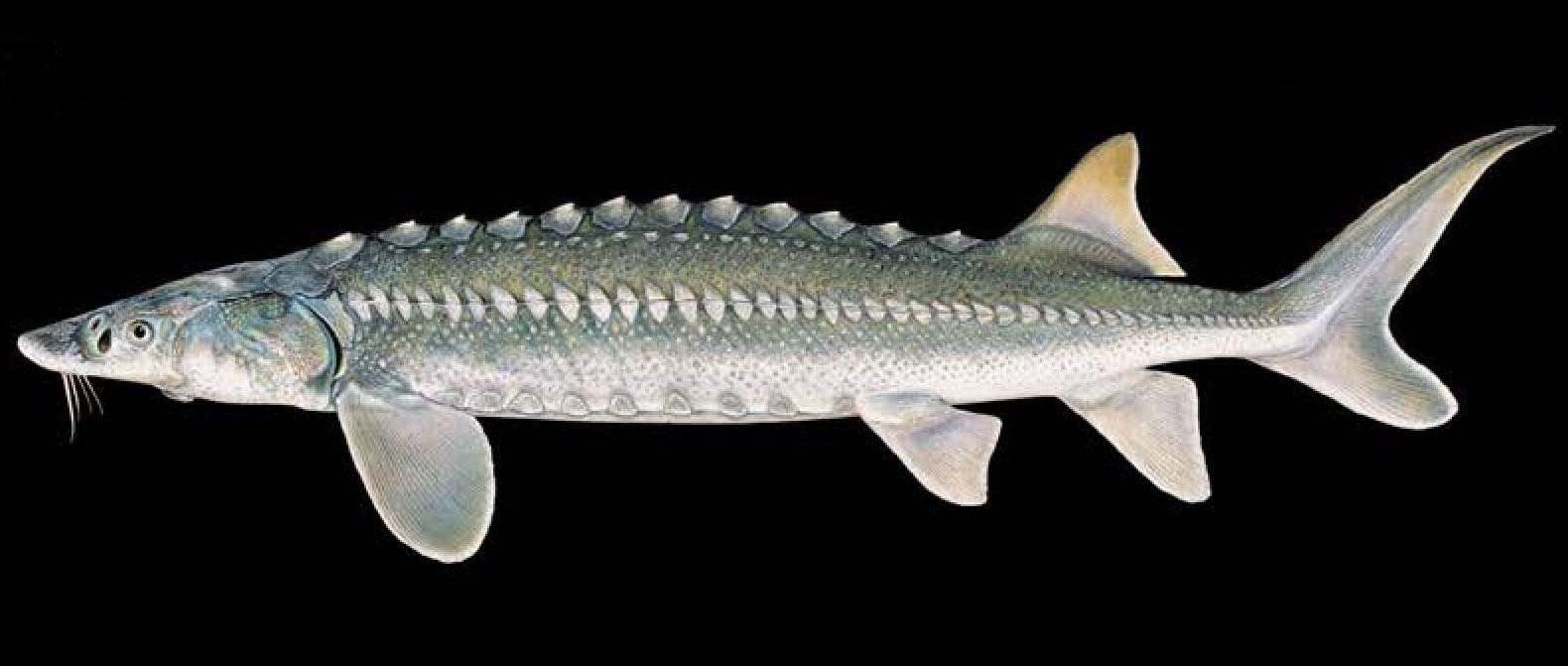
White sturgeon

=== Acipenseridae ===
- Green sturgeon, Acipenser medirostris, JF SG NG
- White sturgeon, Acipenser transmontanus, JF SG NG NS SS HC

== Anguilliformes (eels) ==
=== Nemichthyidae (snipe eels) ===
- Slender snipe eel, Nemichthys scolopaceus, JF SG NS

== Clupeiformes (herrings) ==
=== Engraulidae (anchovies) ===
- Northern anchovy, Engraulis mordax, JF SJ BB SG NG NS SS HC

=== Clupeidae (herrings and sardines) ===
- American shad, Alosa sapidissima, JF SJ BB SG NG NS SS HC
- Pacific herring, Clupea pallasii, JF SJ BB SG NG NS SS HC
- Pacific sardine, Sardinops sagax, JF SJ SG NS SS HC

== Cypriniformes (carps) ==
=== Cyprinidae (minnows and carps) ===
- Common carp, Cyprinus carpio, SG

== Argentiniformes (marine smelts) ==
=== Bathylagidae (deep sea smelts) ===
- Northern smoothtongue, Leuroglossus schmidti, SG NG

== Osmeriformes (freshwater smelts) ==
=== Osmeridae (smelts) ===
- Whitebait smelt, Allosmerus elongatus, JF SJ
- Surf smelt, Hypomesus pretiosus, JF SJ SG NS SS HC
- Capelin, Mallotus villosus, JF
- Night smelt, Spirinchus starksi, JF
- Longfin smelt, Spirinchus thaleichthys, JF SJ BB SG NG NS SS HC
- Eulachon, Thaleichthys pacificus, JF SJ SG NG NS SS

== Salmoniformes (trouts) ==
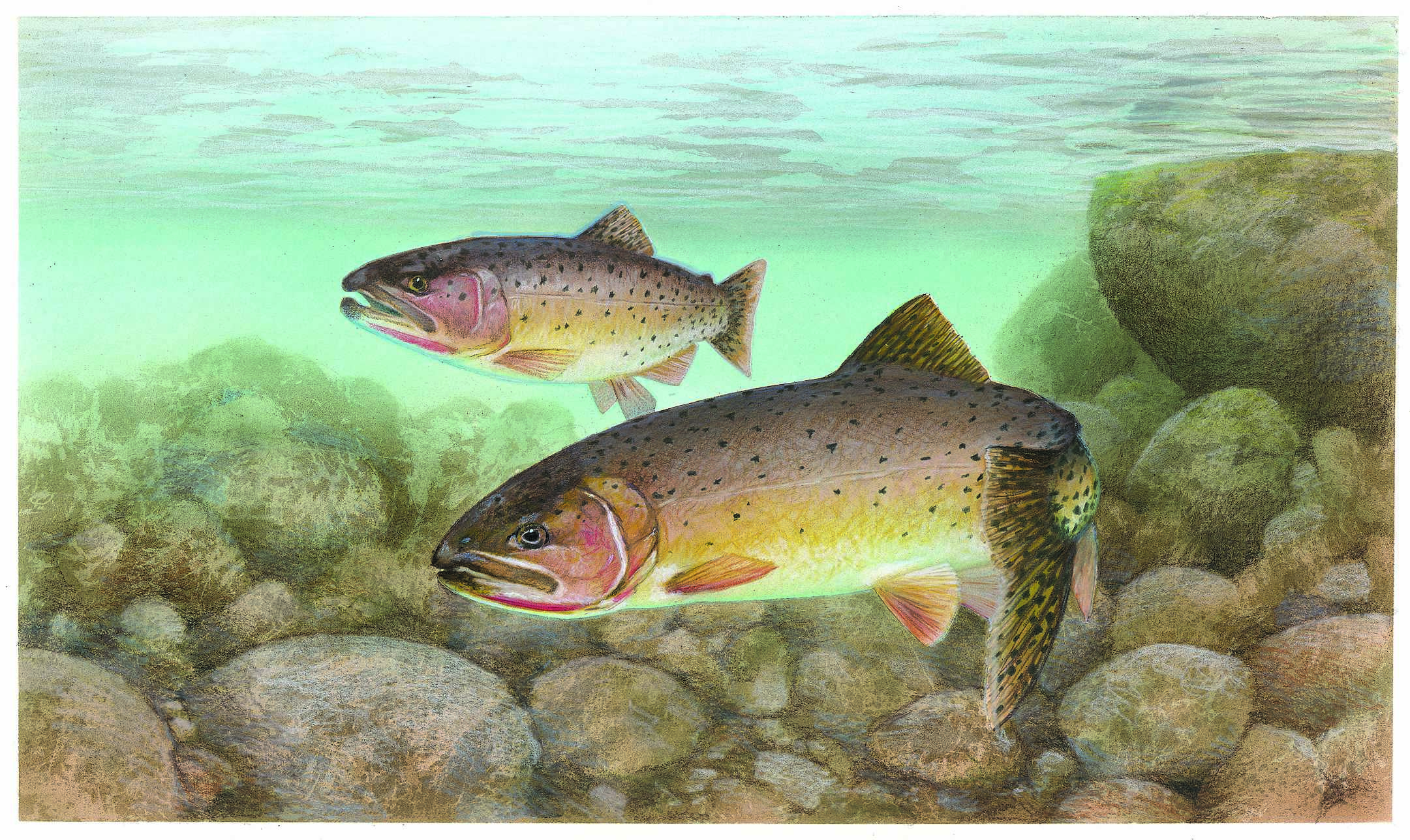
Coastal cutthroat trout

=== Salmonidae (trouts and salmons) ===
- Cutthroat trout, Oncorhynchus clarkii, JF SJ BB SG NG NS SS HC
- Pink salmon, Oncorhynchus gorbuscha, JF SJ BB SG NG NS SS HC
- Chum salmon, Oncorhynchus keta, JF SJ BB SG NG NS SS HC
- Coho salmon, Oncorhynchus kisutch, JF SJ BB SG NG NS SS HC
- Steelhead, Oncorhynchus mykiss, JF SJ BB SG NG NS SS HC
- Sockeye salmon, Oncorhynchus nerka, JF SJ BB SG NG NS SS HC
- Chinook salmon, Oncorhynchus tshawytscha, JF SJ BB SG NG NS SS HC
- Atlantic salmon, Salmo salar, JF BB SG NG NS SS HC
- Bull trout, Salvelinus confluentus, JF BB SG NG NS SS HC
- Dolly Varden, Salvelinus malma, JF SJ BB SG NG NS SS HC

== Stomiiformes (dragonfishes) ==
=== Sternoptychidae (marine hatchetfishes) ===
- Lowcrest hatchetfish, Argyropelecus sladeni, SG

=== Stomiidae (dragonfishes) ===
- Pacific viperfish, Chauliodus macouni, JF SG

== Aulopiformes (lizardfishes) ==
=== Synodontidae ===
- California lizardfish, Synodus lucioceps, JF NS

=== Alepisauridae (lancetfishes) ===
- Longnose lancetfish, Alepisaurus ferox, JF SJ SG NS SS

=== Paralepididae (barracudinas) ===
- White barracudina, Arctozenus risso, NS SS

== Myctophiformes (lanternfishes) ==
=== Myctophidae ===
- California headlightfish, Diaphus theta, JF SJ SG NS SS HC
- Pinpoint lampfish, Lampanyctus regalis, SG
- California flashlightfish, Protomyctophum crockeri, SG
- Northern flashlightfish, Protomyctophum thompsoni, SJ
- Northern lampfish, Stenobrachius leucopsarus, JF SJ NS SS
- Blue lanternfish, Tarletonbeania crenularis, SJ

== Lampriformes (opahs) ==
=== Lampridae ===
- Opah, Lampris guttatus, JF NS

=== Trachipteridae (ribbonfishes) ===
- King-of-the-salmon, Trachipterus altivelis, JF SJ SG

== Gadiformes (cods) ==
=== Merlucciidae (merlucciid hakes) ===
- Pacific hake, Merluccius productus, JF SJ BB SG NG NS SS HC

=== Gadidae (cods) ===
- Walleye pollock, Gadus chalcogrammus, JF SJ BB SG NG NS SS HC
- Pacific cod, Gadus macrocephalus, JF SJ BB SG NG NS SS HC
- Pacific tomcod, Microgadus proximus, JF SJ BB SG NG NS SS HC

== Ophidiiformes (cusk-eels) ==
=== Bythitidae (viviparous brotulas) ===
- Red brotula, Brosmophycis marginata, BB SG NS SS HC

=== Ophidiidae (cusk-eels) ===
- Spotted cusk-eel, Chilara taylori, SG

== Batrachoidiformes (toadfishes) ==
=== Batrachoididae ===
- Plainfin midshipman, Porichthys notatus, JF SJ BB SG NG NS SS HC

== Beloniformes (needlefishes) ==
=== Scomberesocidae (sauries) ===
- Pacific saury, Cololabis saira, JF NS

== Cyprinodontiformes (killfishes) ==
=== Cyprinodontidae (pupfishes) ===
- Sheepshead minnow, Cyprinodon variegatus, JF

== Gasterosteiformes (sticklebacks) ==
=== Aulorhynchidae (tubesnouts) ===
- Tubesnout, Aulorhynchus flavidus, JF SJ BB SG NG NS SS HC

=== Gasterosteidae (sticklebacks) ===
- Threespine stickleback, Gasterosteus aculeatus, JF SJ BB SG NG NS SS HC

=== Syngnathidae (pipefishes) ===
- Bay pipefish, Syngnathus leptorhynchus, JF SJ BB SG NG NS SS HC

== Scorpaeniformes (mail-cheeked fishes) ==
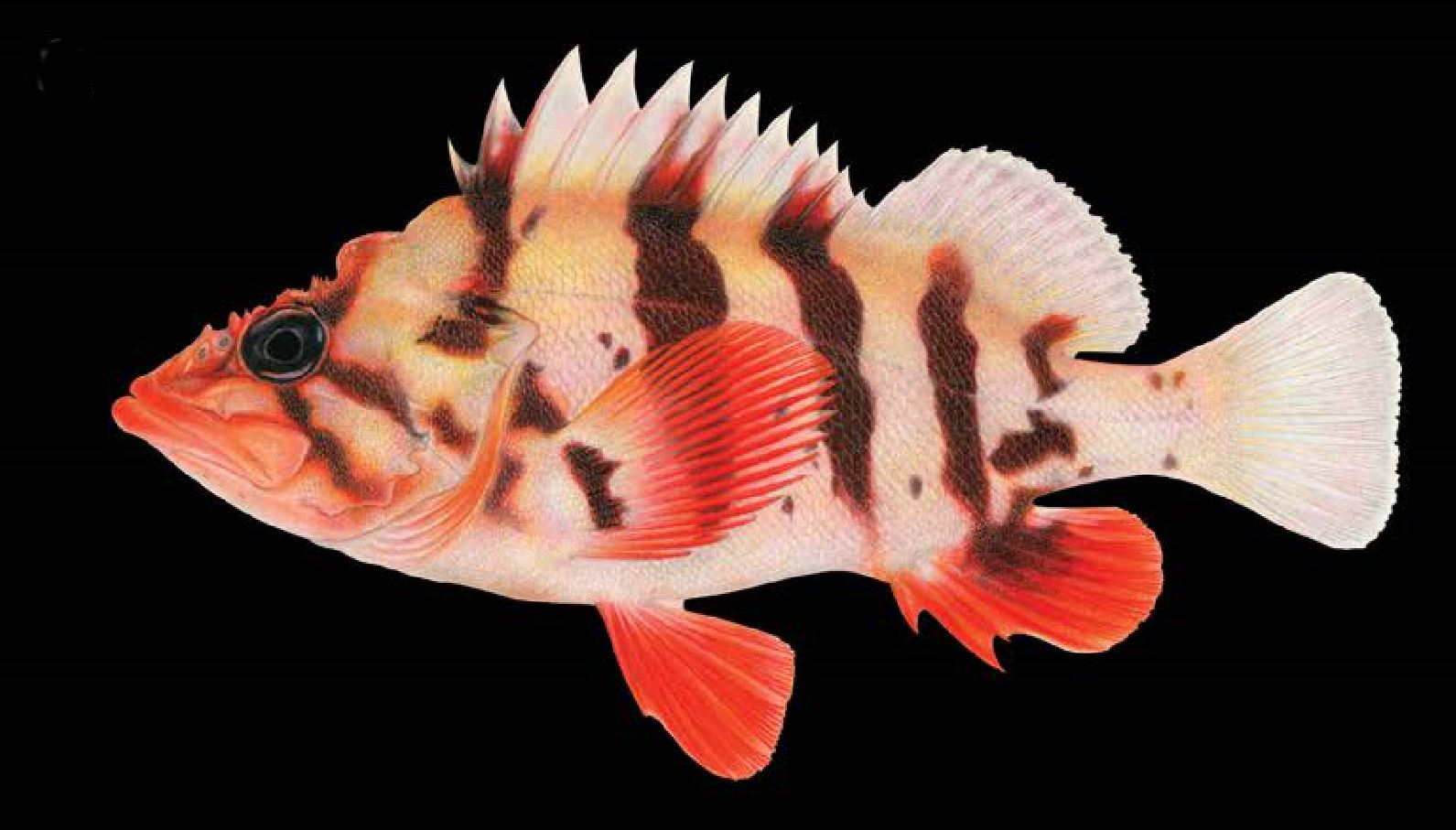
Tiger rockfish

=== Scorpaenidae (scorpionfishes) ===
- Rougheye rockfish, Sebastes aleutianus, JF NS
- Pacific ocean perch, Sebastes alutus, JF SG
- Brown rockfish, Sebastes auriculatus, JF SJ BB SG NG NS SS HC
- Redbanded rockfish, Sebastes babcocki, JF SJ HC
- Silvergray rockfish, Sebastes brevispinis, SJ SS
- Copper rockfish, Sebastes caurinus, JF SJ BB SG NG NS SS HC
- Darkblotched rockfish, Sebastes crameri, JF SG NS
- Splitnose rockfish, Sebastes diploproa, JF SJ SG NS
- Greenstriped rockfish, Sebastes elongatus, JF SG NS SS HC
- Puget Sound rockfish, Sebastes emphaeus, JF SJ NS SS HC
- Widow rockfish, Sebastes entomelas, JF SJ NS
- Yellowtail rockfish, Sebastes flavidus, JF SJ SG NS SS
- Rosethorn rockfish, Sebastes helvomaculatus, SJ NS
- Quillback rockfish, Sebastes maliger, JF SJ BB SG NG NS SS HC
- Black rockfish, Sebastes melanops, JF SJ BB SG NG NS SS HC
- Vermilion rockfish, Sebastes miniatus, JF SJ NG NS HC
- Blue rockfish, Sebastes mystinus, JF SG
- China rockfish, Sebastes nebulosus, JF SJ
- Tiger rockfish, Sebastes nigrocinctus, JF SJ SG NS
- Bocaccio rockfish, Sebastes paucispinis, JF BB SG NS SS HC
- Redstripe rockfish, Sebastes proriger, JF SJ BB SG NS SS HC
- Canary rockfish, Sebastes pinniger, JF SJ BB SG NS SS HC
- Rosy rockfish, Sebastes rosaceus, JF NS
- Yelloweye rockfish, Sebastes ruberrimus, JF SJ BB SG NG NS SS HC
- Stripetail rockfish, Sebastes saxicola, JF SG NS SS HC
- Halfbanded rockfish, Sebastes semicinctus, JF
- Sharpchin rockfish, Sebastes zacentrus, JF SG NS SS
- Shortspine thornyhead, Sebastolobus alascanus, JF SJ NS SS

=== Anoplopomatidae (sablefishes) ===
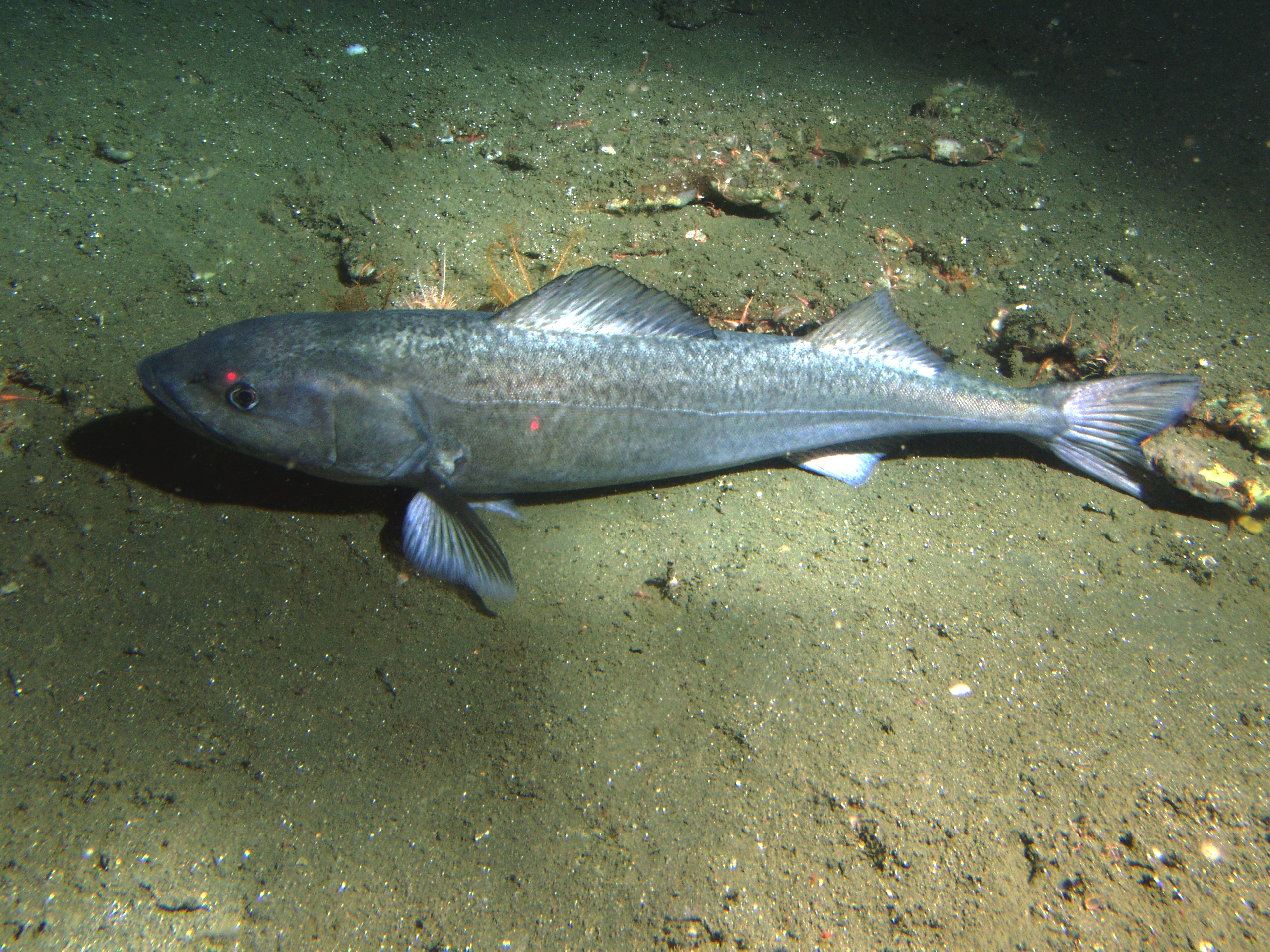
Sablefish

- Sablefish, Anoplopoma fimbria, JF SJ BB SG NG NS SS HC

=== Hexagrammidae (greenlings) ===
- Kelp greenling, Hexagrammos decagrammus, JF BB SG NG NS
- Rock greenling, Hexagrammos lagocephalus, JF SJ BB SG NS
- Whitespotted greenling, Hexagrammos stelleri, JF SJ SG NS SS HC
- Lingcod, Ophiodon elongatus, JF SJ BB SG NG NS SS HC
- Painted greenling, Oxylebius pictus, JF SJ SG NG NS SS HC
- Longspine combfish, Zaniolepis latipinnis, JF SG NG NS SS HC

=== Rhamphocottidae (grunt sculpins) ===
- Grunt sculpin, Rhamphocottus richardsonii, JF SJ BB SG NG NS SS HC

=== Cottidae (sculpins) ===
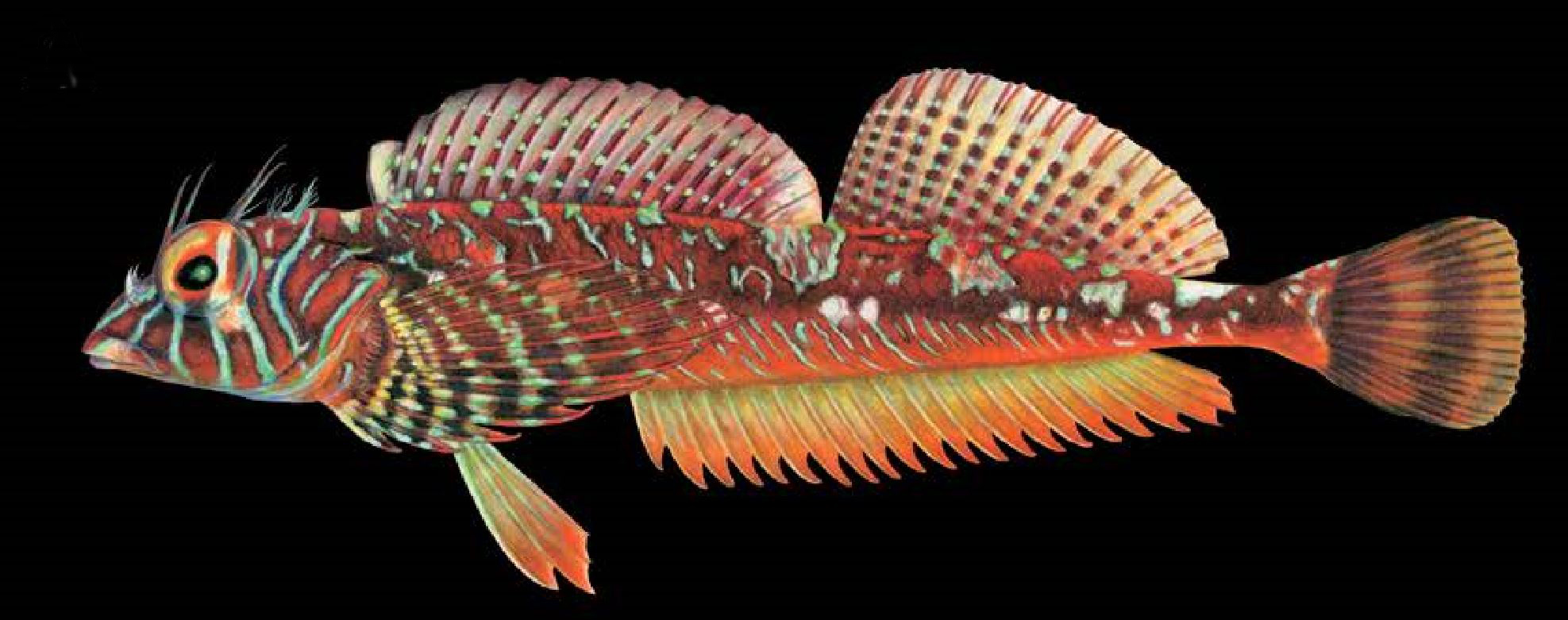
Longfin sculpin

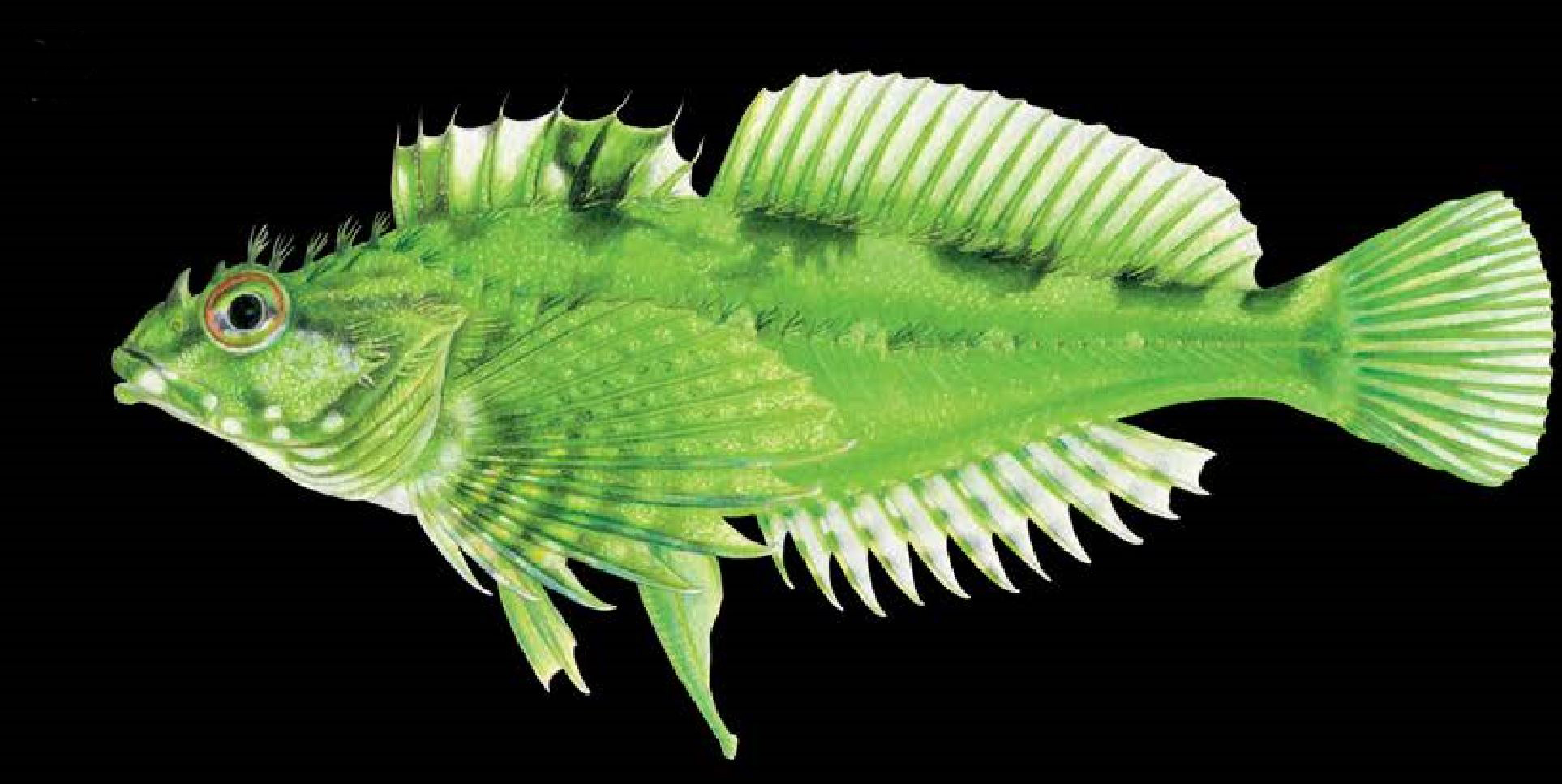
Fluffy sculpin

- Padded sculpin, Artedius fenestralis, JF SJ BB SG NG NS SS HC
- Scalyhead sculpin, Artedius harringtoni, JF SJ BB SG NG NS SS HC
- Smoothhead sculpin, Artedius lateralis, JF SJ BB SG NG NS SS HC
- Bonyhead sculpin, Artedius notospilotus, NS
- Rosylip sculpin, Ascelichthys rhodorus, JF SJ SG NG NS SS
- Spinynose sculpin, Asemichthys taylori, JF SJ SG
- Roughback sculpin, Chitonotus pugetensis, JF SJ BB SG NG NS SS HC
- Sharpnose sculpin, Clinocottus acuticeps, JF SJ SG NG NS SS HC
- Calico sculpin, Clinocottus embryum, JF SJ SG NS
- Mosshead sculpin, Clinocottus globiceps, JF SJ NS
- Coastrange sculpin, Cottus aleuticus, JF SJ BB SG NG NS SS HC
- Prickly sculpin, Cottus asper, JF SJ BB SG NG NS SS HC
- Buffalo sculpin, Enophrys bison, JF SJ BB SG NS SS HC
- Red Irish lord, Hemilepidotus hemilepidotus, JF SJ BB SG NG NS SS HC
- Brown Irish lord, Hemilepidotus spinosus, JF NS
- Northern sculpin, Icelinus borealis, JF SJ SG NG NS SS HC
- Dusky sculpin, Icelinus burchami, SG HC
- Threadfin sculpin, Icelinus filamentosus, SJ SG NG NS HC
- Fringed sculpin, Icelinus fimbriatus, SG NG
- Spotfin sculpin, Icelinus tenuis, SG NG NS SS
- Longfin sculpin, Jordania zonope, JF SJ SG NG NS
- Pacific staghorn sculpin, Leptocottus armatus, JF SJ BB SG NG NS SS HC
- Great sculpin, Myoxocephalus polyacanthocephalus, JF SJ BB SG NG NS SS HC
- Tidepool sculpin, Oligocottus maculosus, JF SJ BB SG NG NS SS HC
- Saddleback sculpin, Oligocottus rimensis, JF SJ SG NS
- Fluffy sculpin, Oligocottus snyderi, JF SJ
- Thornback sculpin, Paricelinus hopliticus, SG NG
- Slim sculpin, Radulinus asprellus, JF SJ BB SG NG NS SS HC
- Darter sculpin, Radulinus boleoides, SJ NS
- Puget Sound sculpin, Ruscarius meanyi, JF SJ SG NS
- Cabezon, Scorpaenichthys marmoratus, JF SJ BB SG NG NS SS HC
- Manacled sculpin, Synchirus gilli, JF SJ SG NS SS HC
- Roughspine sculpin, Triglops macellus, JF SJ BB SG NS SS HC
- Ribbed sculpin, Triglops pingelii, JF SJ BB SG NS

=== Hemitripteridae (spiny sculpins) ===
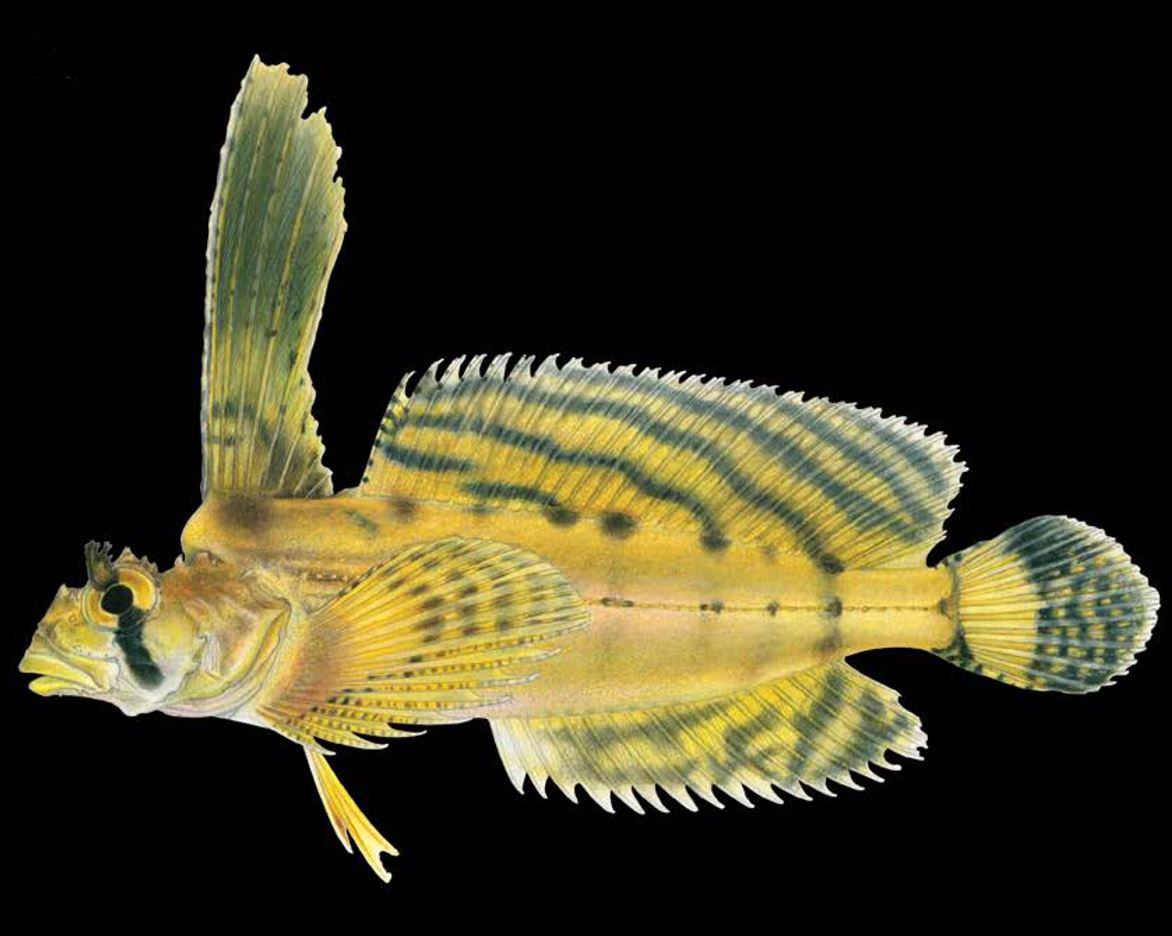
Sailfin sculpin

- Silverspotted sculpin, Blepsias cirrhosus, JF SJ BB SG NS SS HC
- Sailfin sculpin, Nautichthys oculofasciatus, JF SJ BB SG NG NS SS HC

=== Agonidae (poachers) ===
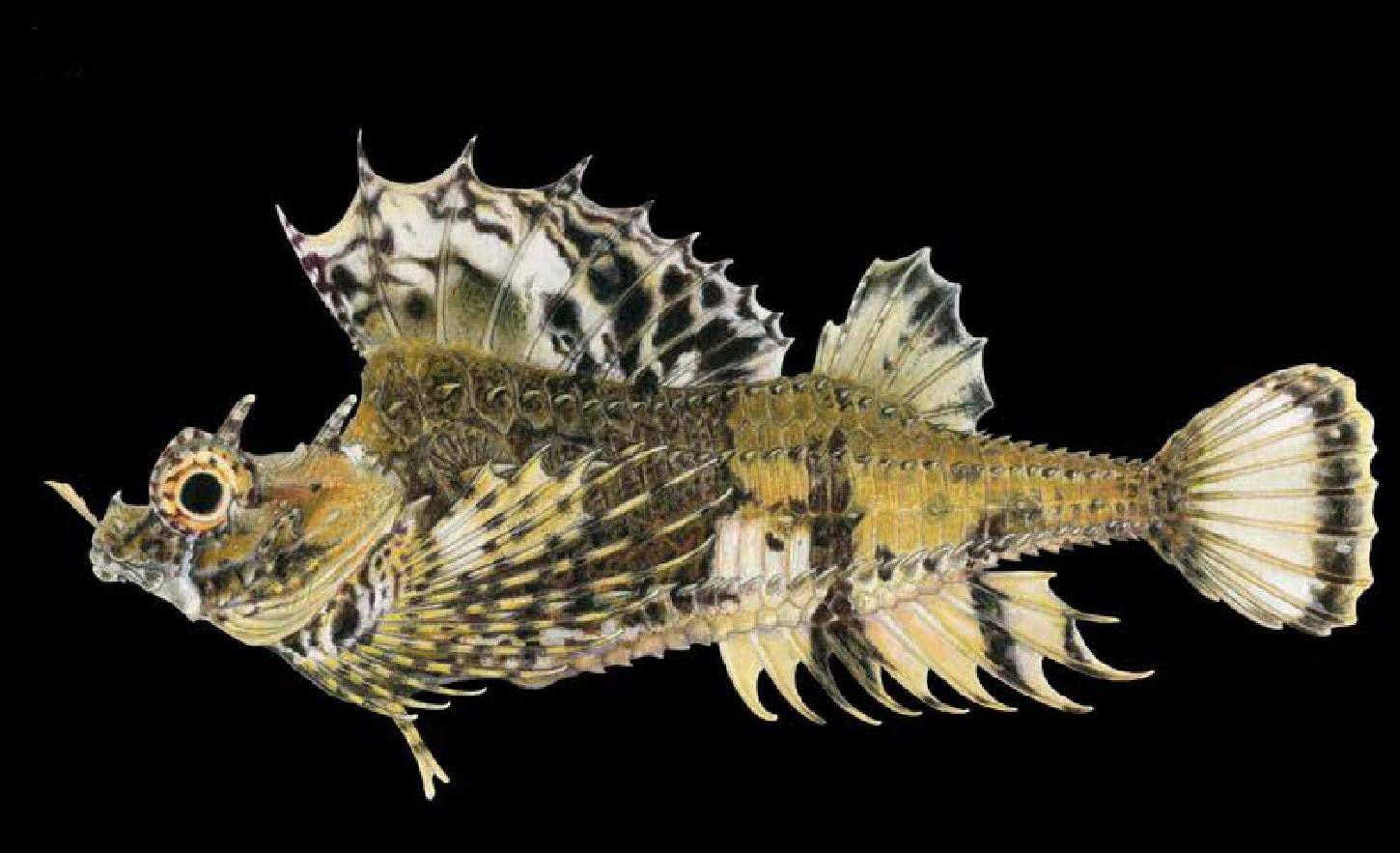
Fourhorn poacher

- Northern spearnose poacher, Agonopsis vulsa, JF SJ SG NS SS HC
- Smooth alligatorfish, Anoplagonus inermis, JF SJ SG NG NS
- Gray starsnout, Bathyagonus alascanus, JF SJ BB SG NS SS
- Spinycheek starsnout, Bathyagonus infraspinatus, JF SJ SG NG NS HC
- Blackfin poacher, Bathyagonus nigripinnis, SJ SG NS SS HC
- Bigeye poacher, Bathyagonus pentacanthus, JF SJ SG NS SS
- Rockhead, Bothragonus swanii, JF SJ NS
- Warty poacher, Chesnonia verrucosa, JF NS
- Fourhorn poacher, Hypsagonus quadricornis , JF SJ NS
- Pygmy poacher, Odontopyxis trispinosa, JF SJ SG NS SS HC
- Tubenose poacher, Pallasina barbata, JF SJ BB SG NS
- Sturgeon poacher, Podothecus accipenserinus , JF SJ BB SG NS SS HC
- Pricklebreast poacher, Stellerina xyosterna , JF
- Blacktip poacher, Xeneretmus latifrons, JF SJ SG NG
- Smootheye poacher, Xeneretmus leiops, JF
- Bluespotted poacher, Xeneretmus triacanthus, SJ BB NS SS HC

=== Psychrolutidae (fathead sculpins) ===
- Spinyhead sculpin, Dasycottus setiger, JF SJ BB SG NG NS SS HC
- Blackfin sculpin, Malacocottus kincaidi, SJ SG NS SS HC
- Tadpole sculpin, Psychrolutes paradoxus, JF SJ BB SG NS SS HC
- Soft sculpin, Psychrolutes sigalutes, JF SJ BB SG NS SS HC

=== Cyclopteridae (lumpfishes) ===
- Pacific spiny lumpsucker, Eumicrotremus orbis, JF SJ SG NS SS

=== Liparidae (snailfishes) ===
- Blacktail snailfish, Careproctus melanurus, JF BB NS
- Spotted snailfish, Liparis callyodon, JF SJ SG NG NS
- Ribbon snailfish, Liparis cyclopus, JF SJ SG NS SS
- Marbled snailfish, Liparis dennyi, JF SJ BB SG NG NS SS
- Tidepool snailfish, Liparis florae, JF SJ SG NG NS
- Slipskin snailfish, Liparis fucensis, JF SJ SG NS SS
- Lobefin snailfish, Liparis greeni, JF SJ BB SG
- Slimy snailfish, Liparis mucosus, JF SJ
- Showy snailfish, Liparis pulchellus, JF SJ BB SG NG NS SS HC
- Ringtail snailfish, Liparis rutteri, JF SJ SG
- Pygmy snailfish, Lipariscus nanus, SG
- Tadpole snailfish, Nectoliparis pelagicus, SG NG NS SS HC

== Perciformes (perches) ==
=== Moronidae (temperate basses) ===
- Striped bass, Morone saxatilis, JF NS SS

=== Carangidae (jacks) ===
- Pacific jack mackerel, Trachurus symmetricus, SS

=== Bramidae (pomfrets) ===
- Pacific pomfret, Brama japonica, NS

=== Sciaenidae (drums and croakers) ===
- White seabass, Atractoscion nobilis, JF NG NS
- White croaker, Genyonemus lineatus, SG NS SS
- Queenfish, Seriphus politus, JF SG NS

=== Embiotocidae (surfperches) ===
- Kelp perch, Brachyistius frenatus, JF SJ SG NS SS HC
- Shiner perch, Cymatogaster aggregata, JF SJ BB SG NG NS SS HC
- Pile perch, Damalichthys vacca, JF SJ BB SG NS SS HC
- Striped seaperch, Embiotoca lateralis, JF SJ BB SG NG NS SS HC
- Silver surfperch, Hyperprosopon ellipticum, JF NS
- White seaperch, Phanerodon furcatus, JF SJ BB NG NS HC

=== Bathymasteridae (ronquils) ===
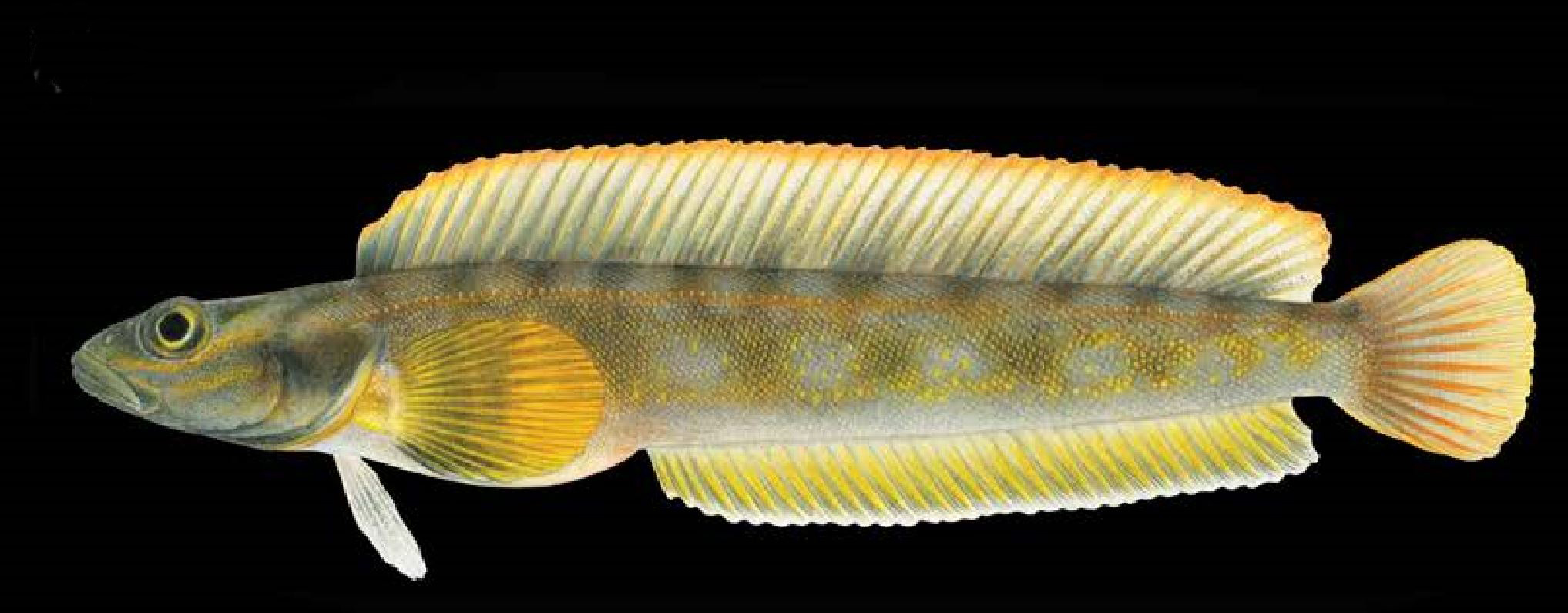
Northern ronquil

- Northern ronquil, Ronquilus jordani, JF SJ SG NS SS HC

=== Zoarcidae (eelpouts) ===
- Pallid eelpout, Lycodapus mandibularis, SG NG NS SS HC
- Smallhead eelpout, Lycodapus parviceps, JF SG
- Bering eelpout, Lycodes beringi, BB SG NG NS HC
- Shortfin eelpout, Lycodes brevipes, JF SJ BB SG NS SS
- Bigfin eelpout, Lycodes cortezianus, JF SJ BB NS
- Blackbelly eelpout, Lycodes pacificus, JF SJ BB SG NG NS SS HC
- Wattled eelpout, Lycodes palearis, SJ BB SG NS HC

=== Stichaeidae (pricklebacks) ===
- Slender cockscomb, Anoplarchus insignis, JF SJ SG NS SS
- High cockscomb, Anoplarchus purpurescens, JF SJ SG NG NS SS HC
- Decorated warbonnet, Chirolophis decoratus, JF SJ BB SG NG NS SS
- Mosshead warbonnet, Chirolophis nugator, JF SJ SG NS SS
- Daubed shanny, Leptoclinus maculatus, JF SJ BB SG NS
- Longsnout prickleback, Lumpenella longirostris, SG
- Y-prickleback, Lumpenopsis hypochroma, SG NG
- Snake prickleback, Lumpenus sagitta, JF SJ BB SG NG NS SS HC
- Ribbon prickleback, Phytichthys chirus, JF SJ SG NS
- Bluebarred prickleback, Plectobranchus evides, SG NS SS HC
- Whitebarred prickleback, Poroclinus rothrocki, SJ BB SG NS SS HC
- Black prickleback, Xiphister atropurpureus, JF SJ SG NS
- Rock prickleback, Xiphister mucosus, JF SJ SG NS

=== Cryptacanthodidae (wrymouths) ===
- Dwarf wrymouth, Cryptacanthodes aleutensis, JF SJ SG NS SS HC
- Giant wrymouth, Cryptacanthodes giganteus, JF SJ BB SG NG NS

=== Pholidae (gunnels) ===
- Penpoint gunnel, Apodichthys flavidus, JF SJ BB SG NG NS SS HC
- Rockweed gunnel, Apodichthys fucorum, JF SJ NG NS
- Longfin gunnel, Pholis clemensi, JF SJ SG NG NS HC
- Crescent gunnel, Pholis laeta, JF SJ BB SG NG NS SS HC
- Saddleback gunnel, Pholis ornata, JF SJ BB SG NS SS HC
- Red gunnel, Pholis schultzi, SJ NG NS

=== Anarhichadidae (wolffishes) ===
- Wolf eel, Anarrhichthys ocellatus, JF SJ BB SG NS SS HC

=== Ptilichthyidae (quillfishes) ===
- Quillfish, Ptilichthys goodei, SJ SG NS HC

=== Zaproridae (prowfishes) ===
- Prowfish, Zaprora silenus, JF SG SS

=== Scytalinidae (graveldivers) ===
- Graveldiver, Scytalina cerdale, SJ BB

=== Trichodontidae (sandfishes) ===
- Pacific sandfish, Trichodon trichodon, JF SJ BB SG

=== Ammodytidae (sand lances) ===
- Pacific sand lance, Ammodytes personatus, JF SJ BB SG NS SS HC

=== Icosteida (ragfishes) ===
- Ragfish, Icosteus aenigmaticus, JF SJ SG NS SS

=== Gobiesocidae (clingfishes) ===
- Northern clingfish, Gobieso maeandricus, JF SJ SG NG NS

=== Gobiidae (gobies) ===
- Arrow goby, Clevelandia ios, JF SJ BB SG NG NS SS HC
- Bay goby, Lepidogobius lepidus, JF SJ BB SG NG NS SS HC
- Blackeye goby, Rhinogobiops nicholsii, JF SJ SG NG NS SS HC

=== Sphyraenidae (barracudas) ===
- Pacific barracuda, Sphyraena argentea, JF SJ NS SS

=== Trichiuridae (cutlassfishes) ===
- North Pacific frostfish, Benthodesmus pacificus, JF NS

=== Scombridae (mackerels) ===
- Pacific bonito, Sarda chiliensis, JF SG NS SS
- Pacific chub mackerel, Scomber japonicus, JF SG NS

=== Stromateidae (butterfishes) ===
- Pacific pompano, Peprilus simillimus, JF SJ BB SG NG NS SS HC

== Pleuronectiformes (flatfishes) ==
=== Paralichthyidae (sand flounders) ===
- Pacific sanddab, Citharichthys sordidus, JF SJ BB SG NG NS SS HC
- Speckled sanddab, Citharichthys stigmaeus JF SJ BB SG NG NS SS HC

=== Pleuronectidae (righteye flounders) ===
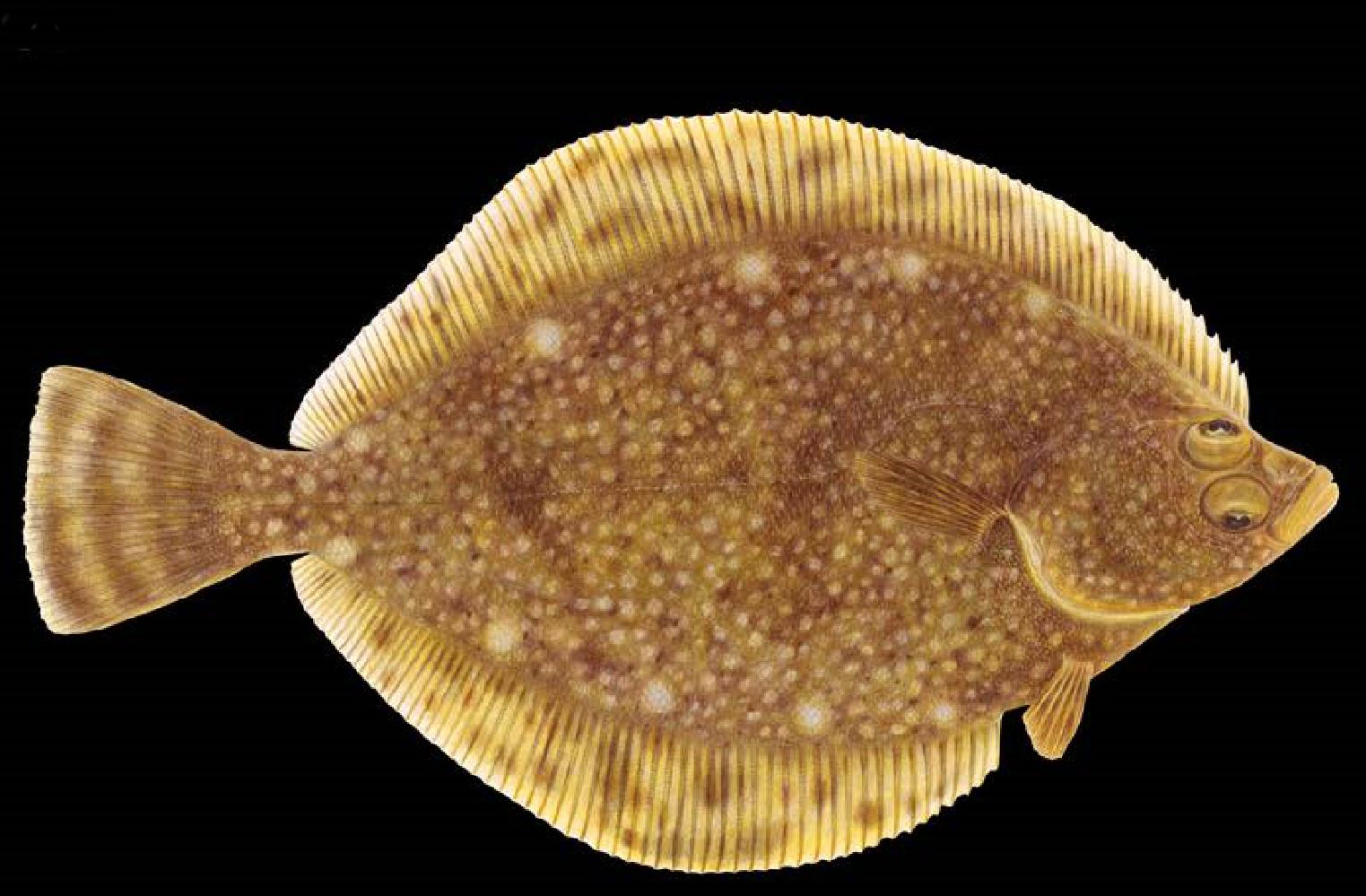
Rock sole

- Arrowtooth flounder, Atheresthes stomias, JF SJ BB SG NG NS SS HC
- Petrale sole, Eopsetta jordani, JF SJ BB SG NG NS SS HC
- Rex sole, Glyptocephalus zachirus, JF SJ BB SG NG NS SS HC
- Flathead sole, Hippoglossoides elassodon, JF SJ BB SG NG NS SS HC
- Pacific halibut, Hippoglossus stenolepis, JF SJ BB SG NG NS SS HC
- Butter sole, Isopsetta isolepis, JF SJ BB SG NG NS SS HC
- Rock sole, Lepidopsetta bilineata, JF SJ BB SG NG NS SS HC
- Northern rock sole, Lepidopsetta polyxystra, JF SJ BB SG NG NS SS HC
- Yellowfin sole , Limanda aspera, SJ
- Slender sole, Lyopsetta exilis, JF SJ BB SG NG NS SS HC
- Dover sole, Microstomus pacificus, JF SJ BB SG NG NS SS HC
- English sole, Parophrys vetulus, JF SJ BB SG NG NS SS HC
- Forkline sole, Parophrys vetulus × Platichthysstellatus, SG NS SS
- Starry flounder, Platichthys stellatus, JF SJ BB SG NG NS SS HC
- C-O sole, Pleuronichthys coenosus, JF SJ BB SG NG NS SS HC
- Curlfin sole, Pleuronichthys decurrens, JF NS SS
- Sand sole, Psettichthys melanostictus, JF SJ BB SG NG NS SS HC

=== Cynoglossidae (tonguefishes) ===
- California tonguefish, Symphurus atricaudus, BB

== Tetraodontiformes (plectognaths) ==
=== Molidae (molas) ===
- Ocean sunfish, Mola mola, JF SJ NG NS
