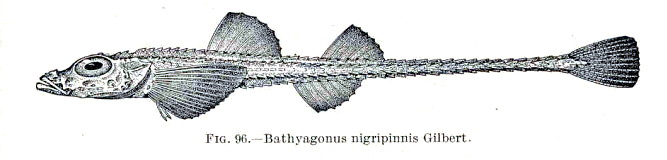
- Bathyagonus nigripinnis

Scientific classification
- Kingdom: Animalia
- Phylum: Chordata
- Class: Actinopterygii
- Division: Teleostei
- Order: Perciformes
- Suborder: Cottoidei
- Family: Agonidae
- Subfamily: Bathyagoninae
- Genus: Bathyagonus; C. H. Gilbert, 1890

Synonyms
- Xenochirus C. H. Gilbert, 1890; Xeneretmus C. H. Gilbert, 1903; Xenopyxis (subgenus of Xeneretmus) C. H. Gilbert, 1915

= Bathyagonus =

Genus of fishes

Bathyagonus is a genus of poachers (bottom-dwelling cold-water marine fish) native to the Pacific Ocean.

== Species ==
There are currently eight recognized species in this genus:

- Bathyagonus alascanus (C. H. Gilbert, 1896) (Gray starsnout)
- Bathyagonus infraspinatus (C. H. Gilbert, 1904) (Spinycheek starsnout)
- Bathyagonus latifrons (C. H. Gilbert, 1890) (blacktip poacher)
- Bathyagonus leiops (C. H. Gilbert, 1915) (smooth-eye poacher)
- Bathyagonus nigripinnis C. H. Gilbert, 1890 (Blackfin poacher)
- Bathyagonus pentacanthus (C. H. Gilbert, 1890) (Bigeye poacher)
- Bathyagonus ritteri (C. H. Gilbert, 1915) (stripefin poacher)
- Bathyagonus triacanthus (C. H. Gilbert, 1890) (blue-spotted poacher)
