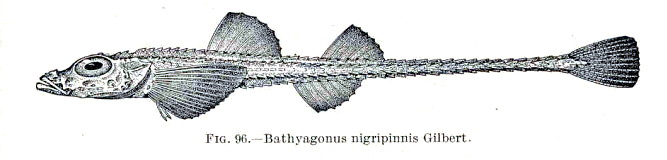
- Blackfin poacher (Bathyagonus nigripinnis)

Scientific classification
- Kingdom: Animalia
- Phylum: Chordata
- Class: Actinopterygii
- Order: Perciformes
- Suborder: Cottoidei
- Family: Agonidae
- Subfamily: Bathyagoninae; Lindberg, 1971

Genera
- see text

= Bathyagoninae =

Subfamily of fishes

Bathyagoninae is a subfamily of marine ray-finned fishes belonging to the family Agonidae, part of the sculpin superfamily Cottoidea. These fishes are found in the Pacific and Atlantic Oceans.

== Genera ==
Bathyagoninae contains following 3 genera:

- Bathyagonus Gilbert, 1890
- Odontopyxis Lockington, 1880
- Xeneretmus Gilbert, 1903
