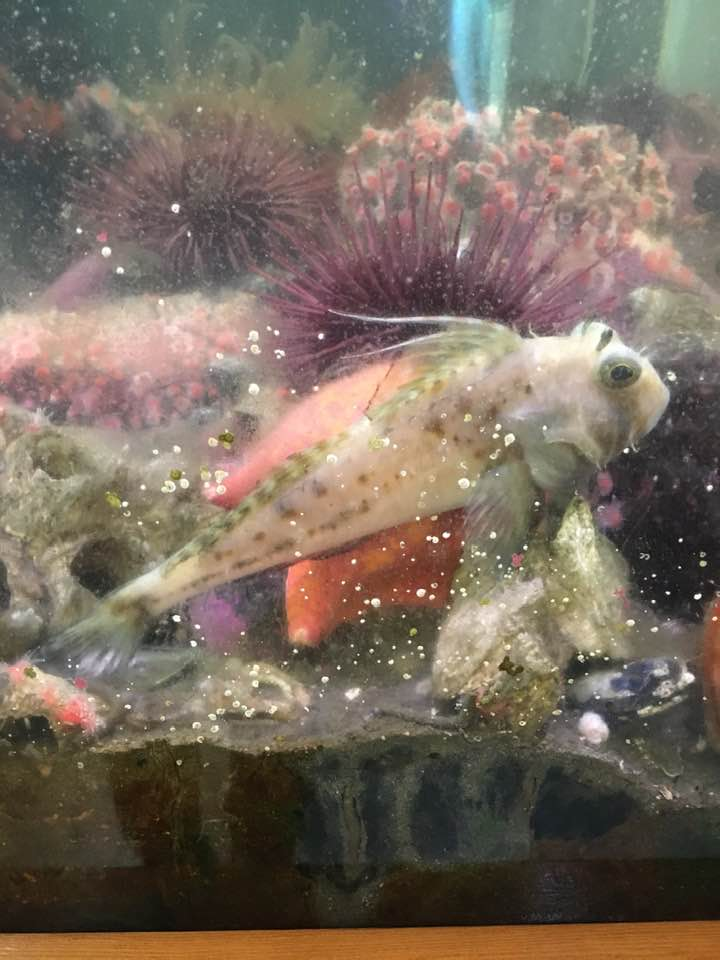
- Threadfin sculpin at Charleston Marine Life Center, Oregon

Conservation status
- Least Concern (IUCN 3.1)

Scientific classification
- Kingdom: Animalia
- Phylum: Chordata
- Class: Actinopterygii
- Division: Teleostei
- Order: Perciformes
- Suborder: Cottoidei
- Family: Psychrolutidae
- Genus: Icelinus
- Species: I. filamentosus

Binomial name
- Icelinus filamentosus Gilbert, 1890

Synonyms
- Tarandichthys filamentosus Gilbert, 1890

= Threadfin sculpin =

Species of fish

The threadfin sculpin (Icelinus filamentosus) is a fish, mostly found in the Pacific waters of North America. A large, deep-water sculpin of the family Cottidae, it occurs in the North Pacific Ocean, from Chirikof Island in the western Gulf of Alaska to Point Loma and Cortez Bank, southern California, USA. Found at depths below 122 ft (37 m), and as deep as 2,624 ft (800 m), little is known about this reclusive species.

== Description and life cycle ==
A member of the Icelinus genus, the threadfin sculpin, like many others in its genus, has a large spine on the top of the preoperculum with antler-like points. They have a single spine and 2 soft rays in the pelvic fin and there are two rows of ctenoid scales along the dorsal fin bases. The body is overall light gray, with splotches of dark brown along the upper flank and head. There are between 9 and 11 dorsal spines, 15-18 dorsal soft rays, 13-15 anal soft rays, and 4 dark saddles across the back. The belly is light gray or yellow, and the anal fin is often a dusky color. Its pectoral fins are quite large, roughly the size of the head. The maximum recorded length is 27 cm (11 in).

It is found over soft bottoms, primarily covered with sand or mud, ranging from 35 to 800 m (110 to 2,620 ft). The species is known to feed primarily on crustaceans such as shrimp and isopods.

While not commercially exploited, the species is considered edible and may be eaten.

== See also ==
- Icelinus
