= Stripefin poacher =

Scientific classification
- Kingdom: Animalia
- Phylum: Chordata
- Class: Actinopterygii
- Order: Perciformes
- Suborder: Cottoidei
- Family: Agonidae
- Genus: Xeneretmus
- Species: X. ritteri

Binomial name
- Xeneretmus ritteri Gilbert, 1915

Species of fish

The stripefin poacher (Xeneretmus ritteri) is a fish in the family Agonidae. It was described by Charles Henry Gilbert in 1915. It is a marine, deep water-dwelling fish which is known from the eastern central Pacific Ocean, including southern California, USA; Baja California, Mexico; and an isolated population in the Gulf of California. It dwells at a depth range of 183–366 metres, and inhabits soft benthic sediments. Males can reach a maximum total length of 16 centimetres.

The stripefin poacher is preyed on by the California sea lion.
