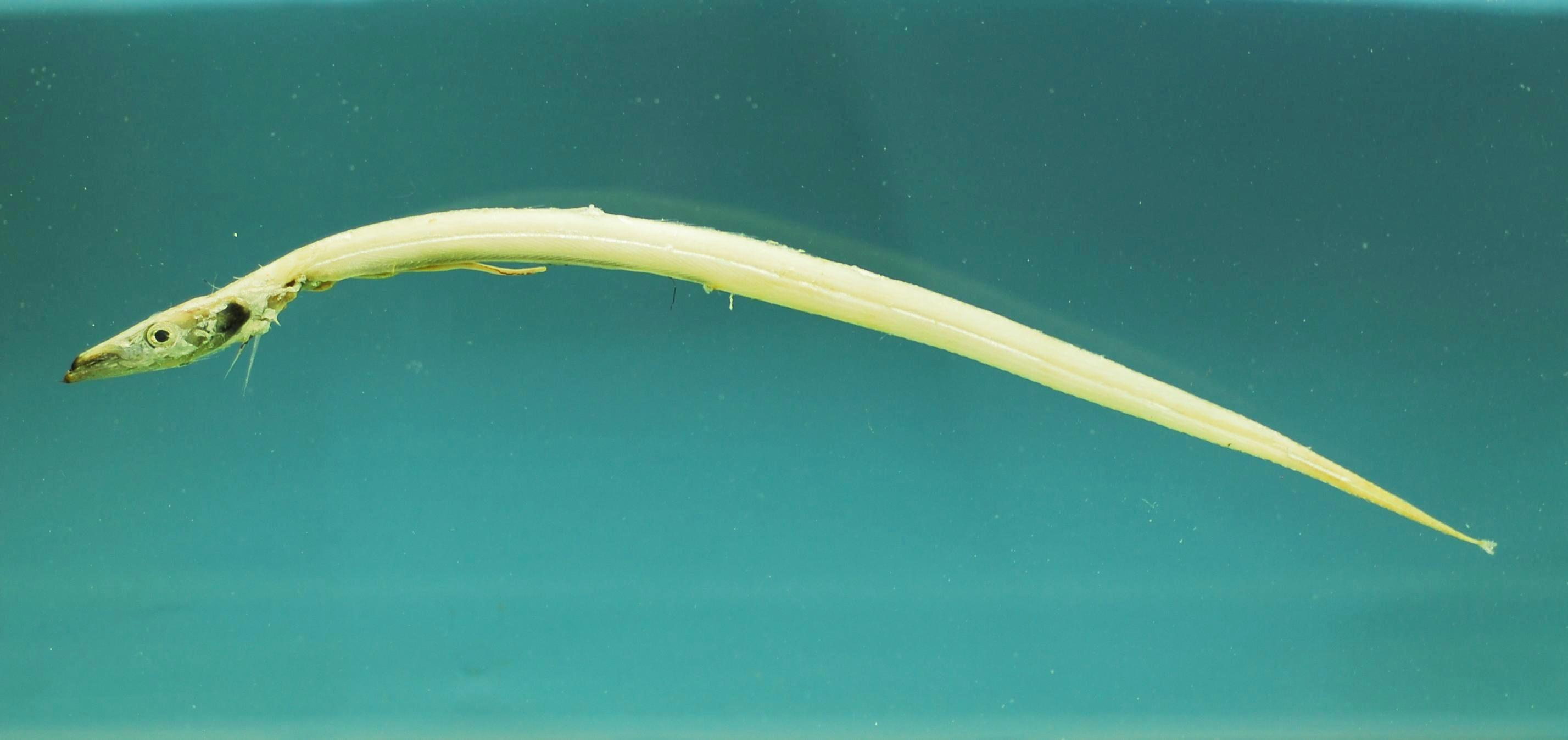

Conservation status
- Least Concern (IUCN 3.1)

Scientific classification
- Kingdom: Animalia
- Phylum: Chordata
- Class: Actinopterygii
- Order: Scombriformes
- Family: Trichiuridae
- Genus: Benthodesmus
- Species: B. tenuis

Binomial name
- Benthodesmus tenuis (Günther, 1877)

Synonyms
- Lepidopus tenuis Günther, 1877; Lepidopus aomori Jordan & Snyder, 1901; Benthodesmus benjamini Fowler, 1938

= Benthodesmus tenuis =

Species of fish

Benthodesmus tenuis, the slender frostfish or ribbon scabbardfish, is a species of cutlassfish in the family Trichiuridae.
