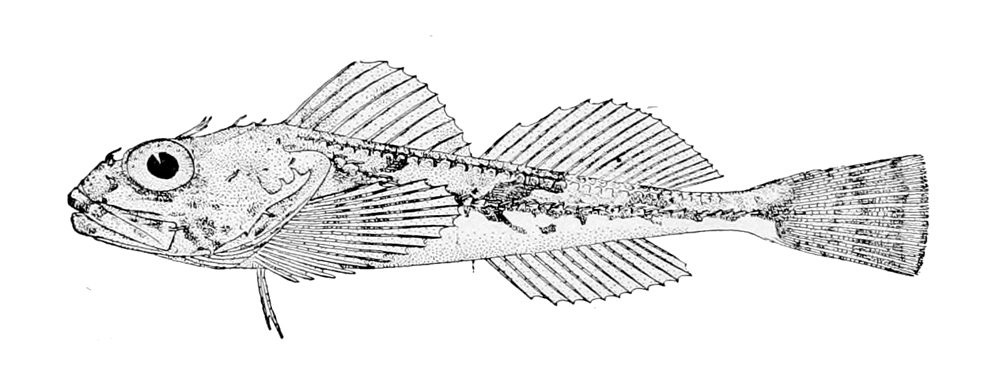

Scientific classification
- Kingdom: Animalia
- Phylum: Chordata
- Class: Actinopterygii
- Order: Perciformes
- Suborder: Cottoidei
- Family: Psychrolutidae
- Genus: Icelinus
- Species: I. borealis

Binomial name
- Icelinus borealis Gilbert, 1896

Synonyms
- Icelinus strabo Starks, 1896

= Icelinus borealis =

Species of fish

Icelinus borealis, the northern sculpin or comb sculpin, is a species of fish in the family Cottidae. It can be found in the northeastern Pacific Ocean along the western coast of North America.

== Taxonomy ==
Icelinus borealis was first formally described in 1896 by the American ichthyologist Charles Henry Gilbert with its type locality given as north and south of the Aleutians and from Bristol Bay in Alaska. The specific name borealis means "northern" and is a reference to the description of this species based on a type locality of Alaska.

== Description ==
Icelinus borealis has a very small antler-like uppermost spine on the preoperculum. There are 9 or 10 spines and between 15 and 17 soft rays supporting the dorsal fins, while the anal fin has between 12 and 14 soft rays. The caudal fin is clearly rounded and the pelvic fins are small and often curved. The overall color is dark olive gray or brown on the upper body, paler below. There are dark saddle marks, typically four, across the body and thin dark brown bars on the head and the fins except for the anal fin. In males the margin of the has black spots. This species has a maximum published standard length of 10.2 cm (4.0 in).

== Distribution and habitat ==
Icelinus borealis is found in the temperate eastern Pacific Ocean from the Bering Sea coast of Alaska south as far as Puget Sound, in Washington. It is a demersal fish found at depths between 9 and 310 m (30 and 1,017 ft) on soft or shell substrates.

== Biology ==
Icelinus borealis feeds on crustaceans, especially shrimp. This species is common in waters near to rookeries of Steller's sea lions (Eumetopias jubatus) and so constitute part of the diverse prey hunted by that mammal.
