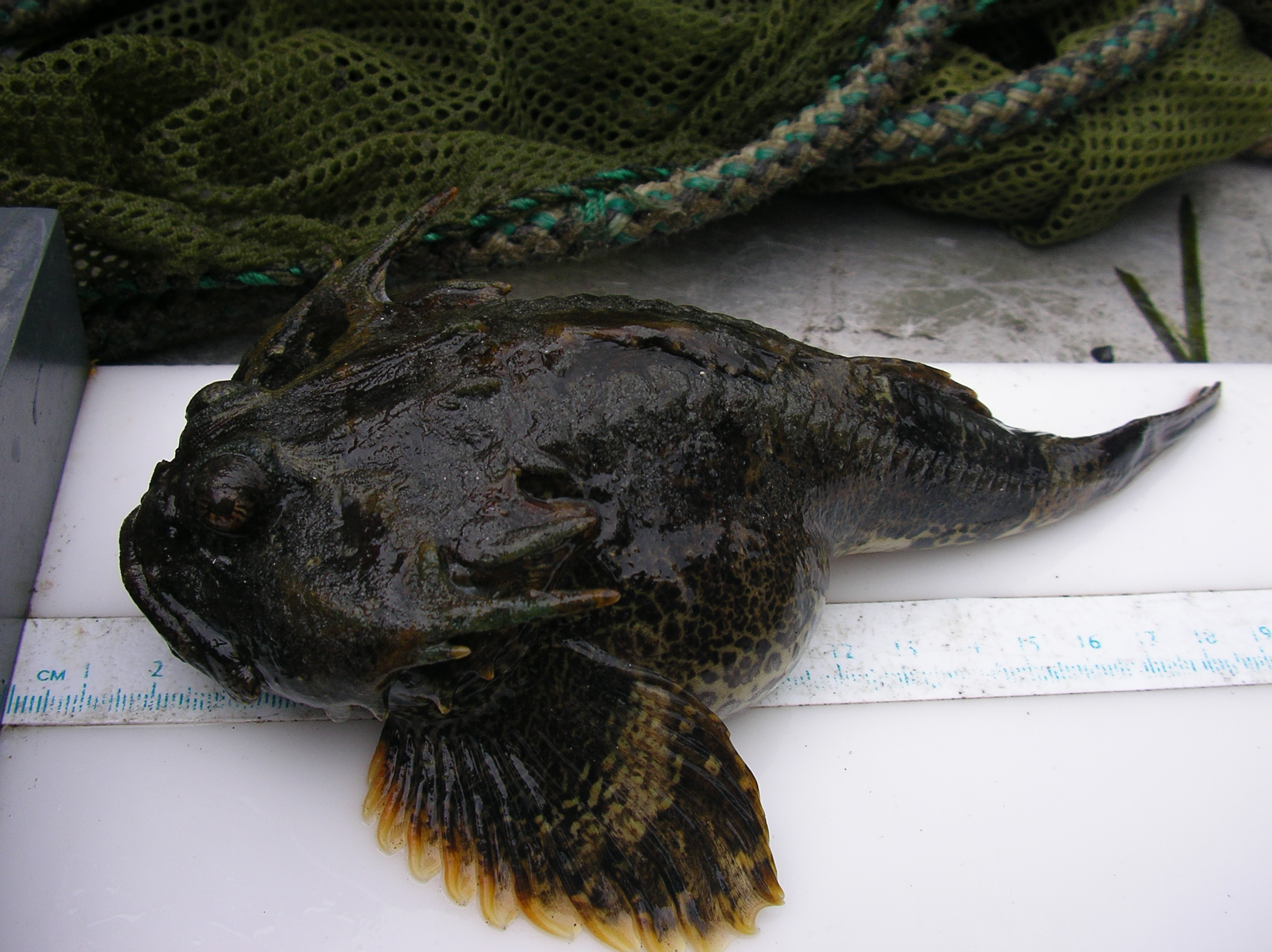
- Buffalo Sculpin (E. bison)
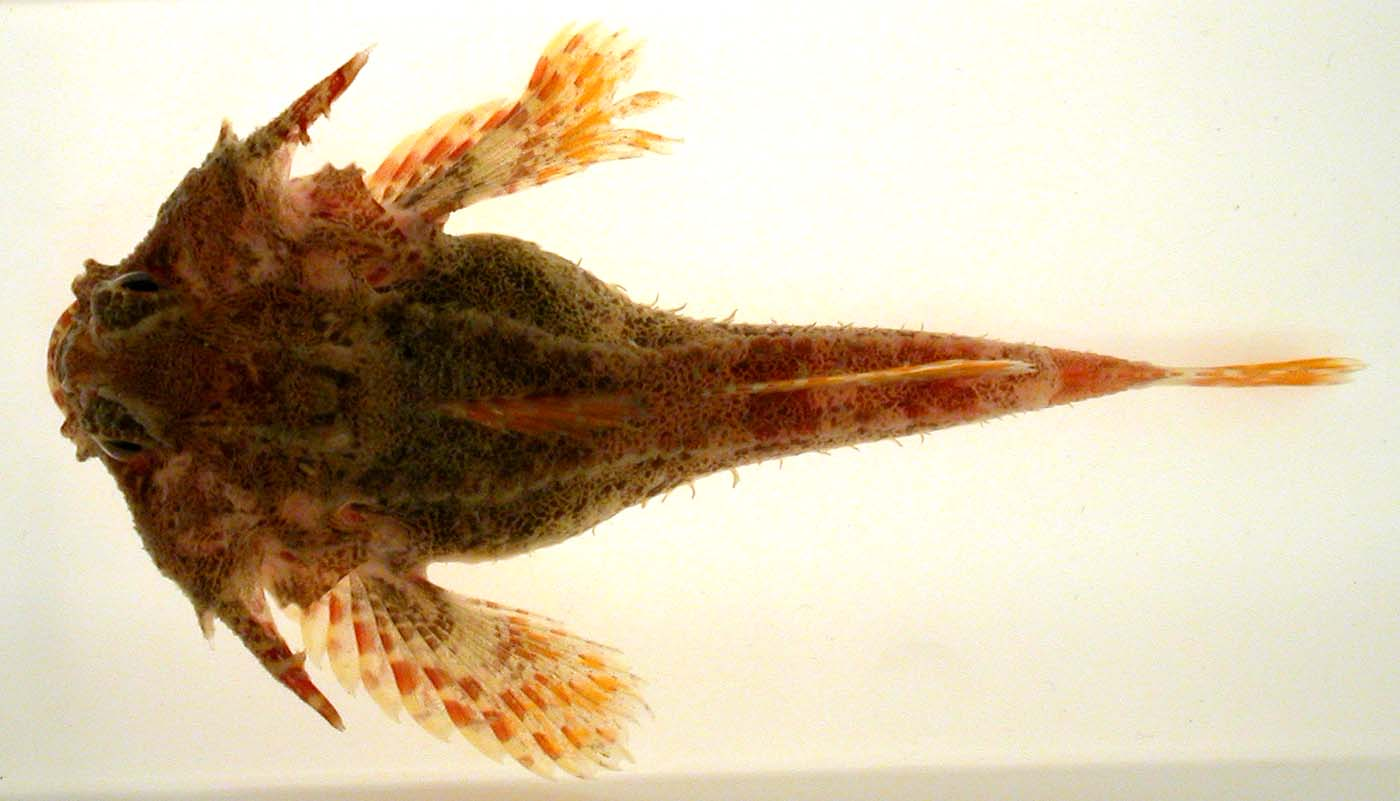
- Antlered Sculpin (E. diceraus)

Scientific classification
- Kingdom: Animalia
- Phylum: Chordata
- Class: Actinopterygii
- Order: Perciformes
- Suborder: Cottoidei
- Family: Psychrolutidae
- Genus: Enophrys; Swainson, 1839

Type species
- Cottus claviger Cuvier, 1829

Synonyms
- Aspicottus Girard, 1854; Ceratocottus Gill, 1859; Clypeocottus Ayres, 1854

= Enophrys =

Enophrys Temporal range: Middle Miocene to present Potential Eocene record

Genus of fishes

Enophrys is a genus of marine ray-finned fishes belonging to the family Psychrolutidae, the marine sculpins. These fishes are found in the northern and eastern Pacific Ocean.

== Taxonomy ==
Enophrys was first proposed as a monospecific genus in 1839 by the English zoologist William Swainson with its only and type species being Cottus claviger. This species had been described in 1839 by the French zoologist Georges Cuvier from Kamchatka but it was later determined to be a synonym of Cottus diceraus, originally described by Peter Simon Pallas in 1787, also from Kamchatka. The 5th edition of Fishes of the World classifies this genus within the subfamily Cottinae of the family Cottidae, however, other authors classify the genus within the subfamily Myoxocephalinae of the family Psychrolutidae, although others place the subfamily Myoxocephalinae within the Cottidae.

== Etymology ==
Enophrys prefixes phrys, meaning "brow", with en, ning "very", presumed to be a reference to the thick orbital ridge of the type species.

== Species ==
Enophrys contains 4 recognized species within it:

- Enophrys bison (Girard, 1854) (Buffalo sculpin)
- Enophrys diceraus (Pallas, 1787) (Antlered sculpin)
- Enophrys lucasi (D. S. Jordan & C. H. Gilbert, 1898) (Leister sculpin)
- Enophrys taurina C. H. Gilbert, 1914 (Bull sculpin)

The fossil species †Enophrys hoplites Nazarkin, 2017 is known from complete fossil skeletons recovered from the Middle Miocene-aged Agnevo Formation of Sakhalin, Russia. In addition, the potential fossil species †Enophrys euglyphus Stinton, 1966 is known from isolated otoliths recovered from the Early Eocene-aged London Clay of England.

== Characteristics ==
Enophrys sculpins share the possession of plates along their lateral lines and some species have prickly scales underneath the lateral line. They also have a very long, sharp spine on the upper preoperculum and sharp spines on the nose. The bull sculpin is the smallest species with a maximum recorded total length of 17 cm (6.7 in) while the largest species is the buffalo sculpin which reaches a maximum published total length of 37 cm (15 in).

== Distribution ==
Enophrys sculpins are only found in the northern and Eastern Pacific Oceans from the Sea of Japan to California.
