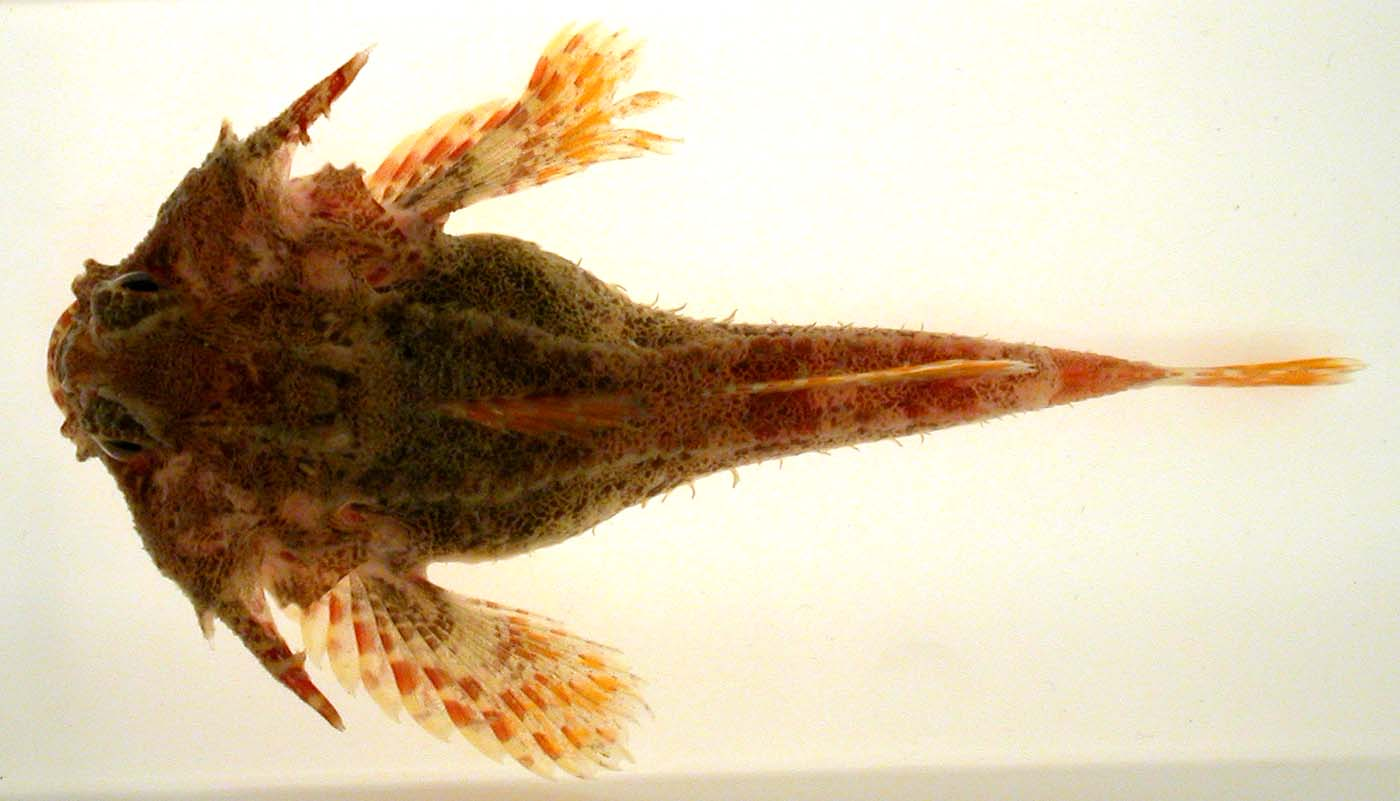

Scientific classification
- Kingdom: Animalia
- Phylum: Chordata
- Class: Actinopterygii
- Order: Perciformes
- Suborder: Cottoidei
- Family: Psychrolutidae
- Genus: Enophrys
- Species: E. diceraus

Binomial name
- Enophrys diceraus (Pallas, 1787)

Synonyms
- Cottus diceraus Pallas, 1787; Ceratocottus diceraus (Pallas, 1787); Cottus claviger Cuvier, 1829; Enophrys claviger (Cuvier, 1829)

= Enophrys diceraus =

Species of fish

Enophrys diceraus, the antlered sculpin, is a species of marine ray-finned fish belonging to the family Cottidae, the typical sculpins. This species occurs in the northern Pacific Ocean.

== Taxonomy ==
Enophrys diceraus was first formally described as Cottus diceraus in 1787 by the German zoologist Peter Simon Pallas with its type locality given as Kamchatka. In 1829 the French zoologist Georges Cuvier described Cottus claviger, also from Kamchatka, and in 1839 the English zoologist William Swainson proposed a new monospecific genus for Cuvier's species which he called Enophrys. Later Cuvier's C. claviger was found to be a synonym of Pallas's C, diceraus but it is the type species of the genus Enophrys. The specific name diceraus means "two-horned" a reference to the preopercular spines, one on each side of the head.

== Description ==
Enophrys diceraus has a long straight spine on the upper cheek, the preopercular spine which reaches past the operculum and has between 2 and 8 ancillary spines, or spinules. The lacrimal bone has a bifurcated flap which extends down over the maxilla. There are 2 dorsal fins which are supported by between 7 or 8 spines and between 12 and 15 soft rays while the anal fin has 10 or 13 soft rays. There are 2 well developed bony ridges on the top of the head. The large lateral line scales are plate like and have 1 or 2 keels and a rough rera edge. This species reaches a maximum published total length of 38 cm (15 in).

== Distribution and habitat ==
Enophrys diceraus is found in the subarctic part of the Pacific Ocean from the northern Sea of Japan to Point Hope in Alaska and in the Chukchi Sea to Amchitka Island in the Aleutians. It is a benthic species of coastal waters found at depths between 2 and 200 m (6 ft 7 in and 656 ft 2 in) over substrates of sand, mud and rock.

== Biology ==
Enophrys diceraus eats benthic invertebrates, especially crustaceans and molluscs, although adults eat brittlestars too, The adults move into shallow water to spawn, the juvenile settle at lengths between 13 and 24 mm (0.51 and 0.94 in) and they become sexually mature at 18 cm (7.1 in). They form aggregations for feeding and spawning in the south of their range in Peter the Great Bay and in central parts along the mainland Asian coast and off the southern part of Sakhalin. These do not occur in the northern part of their range.
