= Benthodesmus vityazi =

Scientific classification
- Kingdom: Animalia
- Phylum: Chordata
- Class: Actinopterygii
- Order: Scombriformes
- Family: Trichiuridae
- Genus: Benthodesmus
- Species: B. vityazi

Binomial name
- Benthodesmus vityazi Parin & Becker, 1970

Species of fish

== Location ==
Benthodesmus vityazi, the Vityaz' frostfish, lives in the Indo-Pacific, with latitude ranging from 33°N - 20°S, and longitudes ranging from 49°E - 141°W. Adults from the benthopelagic are located from 640 to 820 m, while juveniles from the mesopelagic are located from 170 to 900 m.

== Biological features ==
It is a silvery frostfish with blackish jaws and a gill cover, with the inside of the mouth and gill cavities black in color. The pelvic fins are inserted behind the posterior end of the pectoral-fin base, and they have relatively low number of vertebrae, dorsal and anal fin-elements for species with the posterior position of pelvic fins. The anus is located under the 2nd or 3rd soft dorsal-fin ray, and external rays developed only in the posterior part of the anal fin.

== Discovery ==
The fish was discovered by the ship Vityaz, after which it was named.

== Etymology (scientific name) ==
The name “Benthodesmus vityazi” comes from Greek, with “benthos” meaning depth of the sea, and “desmos,” meaning bond or chain.

== See also ==
Glossary of ichthyology

Cutlassfish

Benthodesmus

Ray-finned fish

Demersal fish

Scombriformes
