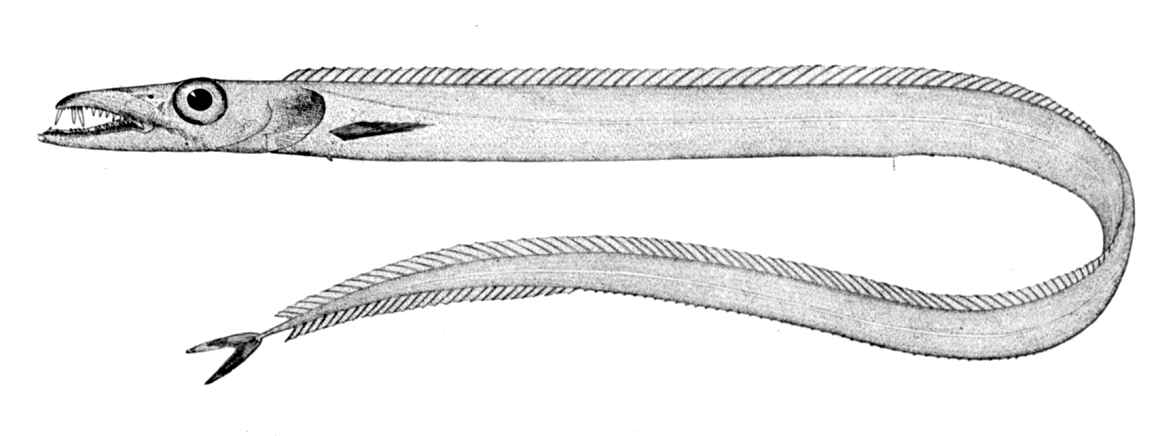
- Simony's Frostfish, Benthodesmus simonyi

Scientific classification
- Domain: Eukaryota
- Kingdom: Animalia
- Phylum: Chordata
- Class: Actinopterygii
- Order: Scombriformes
- Family: Trichiuridae
- Subfamily: Aphanopodinae
- Genus: Benthodesmus; Goode & Bean, 1882

Type species
- Lepidopus elongatus Clarke, 1879

Species
- See text

= Benthodesmus =

Genus of fishes

Benthodesmus is a genus of fish in the family Trichiuridae. There are at least eleven species in this genus, which are known as frostfish. These are not to be confused with Microgadus tomcod and Lepidopus caudatus also known as frostfish.

== Species ==
The World Register of Marine Species lists the following species:

- Benthodesmus elongatus, Clarke, 1879 (Elongate frostfish)
- Benthodesmus macrophthalmus, Parin & Becker, 1970 (Bigeye frostfish)
- Benthodesmus neglectus, Parin, 1976 (Neglected frostfish)
- Benthodesmus oligoradiatus, Parin & Becker, 1970 (Sparse-rayed frostfish)
- Benthodesmus pacificus, Parin & Becker, 1970 (North Pacific frostfish)
- Benthodesmus papua, Parin, 1978 (Papuan frostfish)
- Benthodesmus simonyi, Steindachner, 1891 (Simony's frostfish)
- Benthodesmus suluensis, Parin, 1976 (Philippine frostfish)
- Benthodesmus tenuis, Günther, 1877 (Slender frostfish)
- Benthodesmus tuckeri, Parin & Becker, 1970 (Tucker's frostfish)
- Benthodesmus vityazi, Parin & Becker, 1970 (Vityaz' frostfish)
