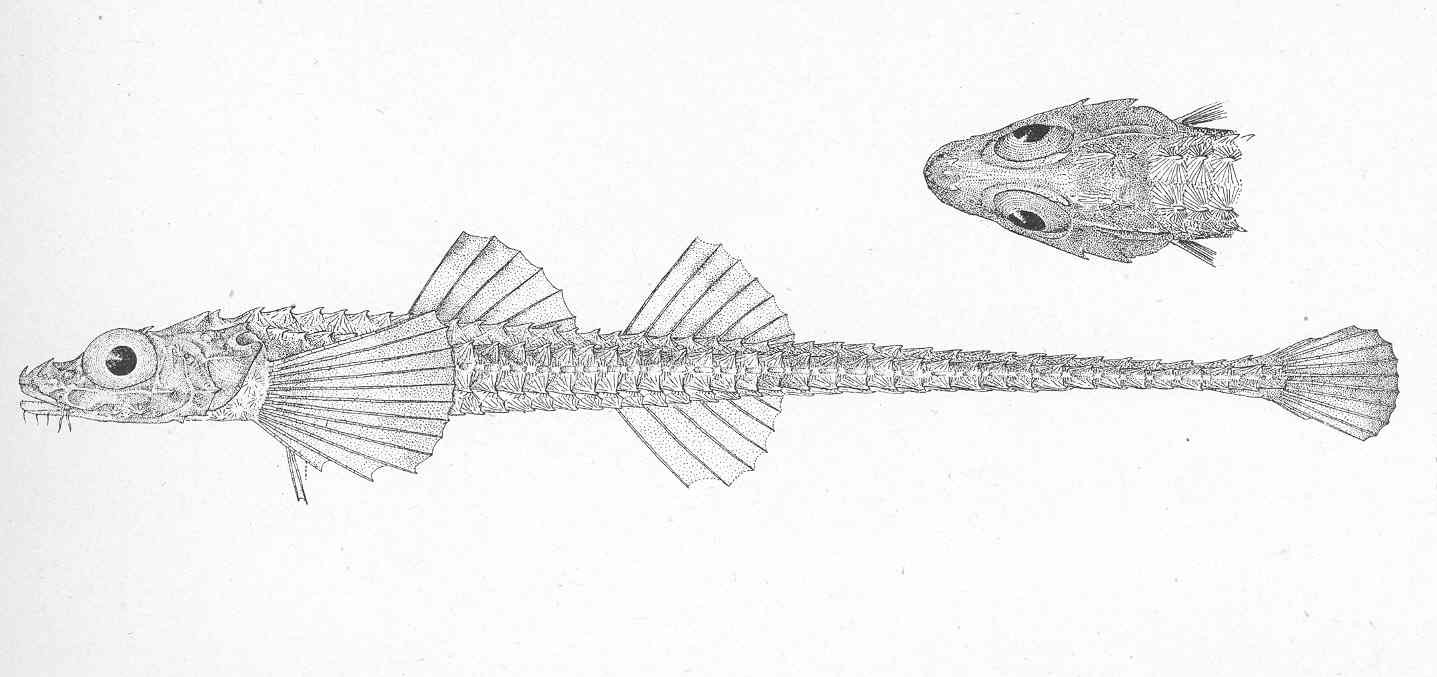

Scientific classification
- Kingdom: Animalia
- Phylum: Chordata
- Class: Actinopterygii
- Order: Perciformes
- Suborder: Cottoidei
- Family: Agonidae
- Genus: Xeneretmus
- Species: X. triacanthus

Binomial name
- Xeneretmus triacanthus (Gilbert, 1890)

Synonyms
- Xenochirus triacanthus Gilbert, 1890

= Bluespotted poacher =

Species of fish

The bluespotted poacher (Xeneretmus triacanthus) is a fish in the family Agonidae. It was described by Charles Henry Gilbert in 1890, originally in the genus Xenochirus.

This marine, deep water-dwelling fish is known from British Columbia, Canada to northern central Baja California, Mexico, in the eastern Pacific Ocean. It inhabits soft benthic sediments at depths ranging from 73 to 373 metres. Males can reach a maximum total length of 18 centimetres.

The bluespotted poacher is preyed on by the California sea lion.
