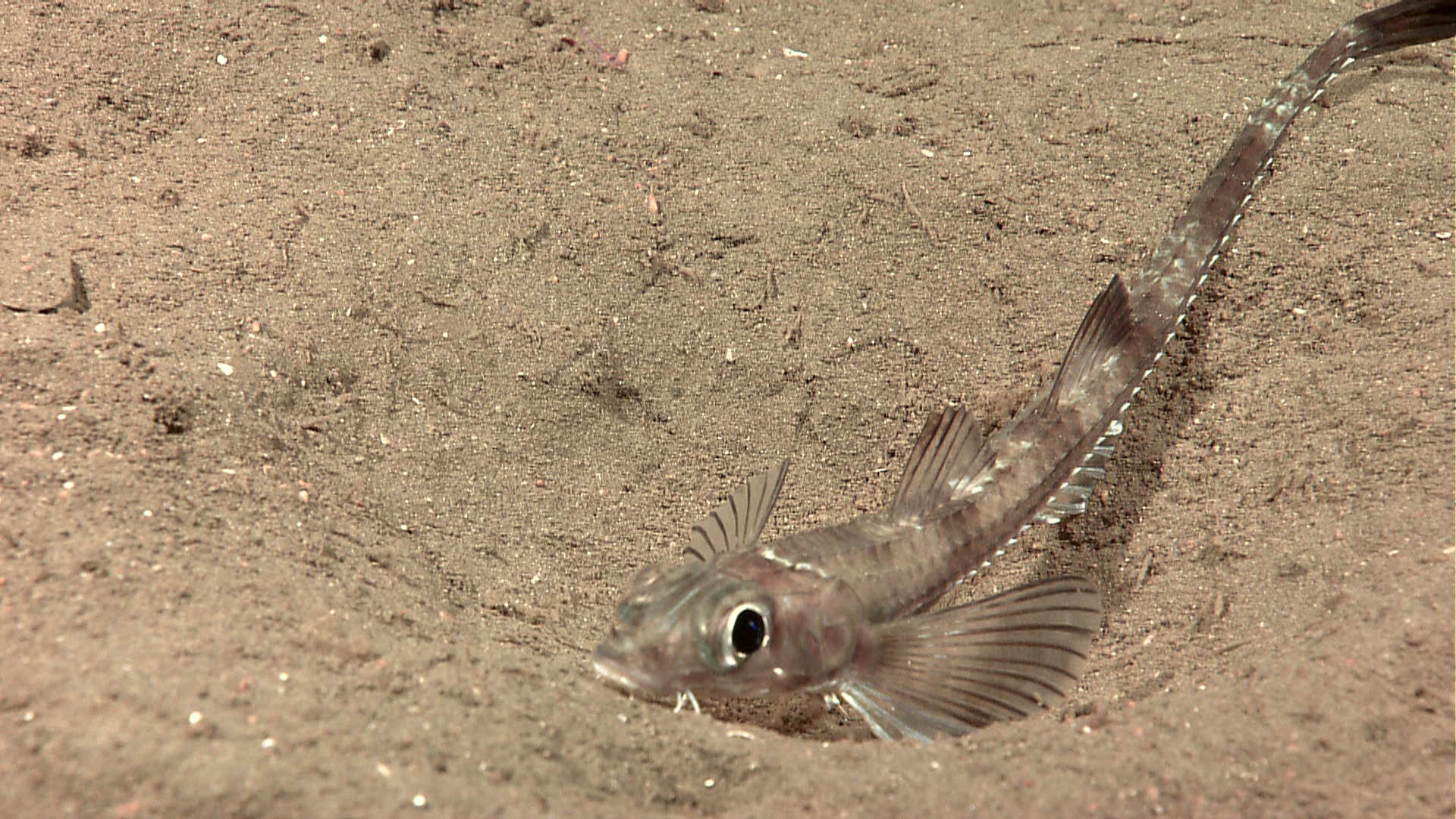

Scientific classification
- Kingdom: Animalia
- Phylum: Chordata
- Class: Actinopterygii
- Order: Perciformes
- Suborder: Cottoidei
- Family: Agonidae
- Genus: Xeneretmus
- Species: X. latifrons

Binomial name
- Xeneretmus latifrons (Gilbert, 1890)

Synonyms
- Xenochirus latifrons Gilbert, 1890

= Blacktip poacher =

Species of fish

The blacktip poacher (Xeneretmus latifrons) is a fish in the family Agonidae. It was described by Charles Henry Gilbert in 1890. It is a marine, deep water-dwelling fish which is known from British Columbia, Canada to Baja California, Mexico, in the eastern Pacific Ocean. It dwells at a depth range of 18–400 metres, and inhabits soft benthic sediments. Males can reach a maximum total length of 19 centimetres.

The blacktip poacher is preyed on by hake, flatfish, and lancetfish. Its own diet consists of mysid crustaceans.
