= Spinycheek starsnout =

Scientific classification
- Domain: Eukaryota
- Kingdom: Animalia
- Phylum: Chordata
- Class: Actinopterygii
- Order: Perciformes
- Suborder: Cottoidei
- Family: Agonidae
- Genus: Bathyagonus
- Species: B. infraspinatus

Binomial name
- Bathyagonus infraspinatus (Gilbert, 1904)

Synonyms
- Xeneretmus infraspinatus Gilbert, 1904; Asterotheca infraspinata (Gilbert, 1904); Bathyagonus infraspinata (Gilbert, 1904)

Species of fish

The spinycheek starsnout (Bathyagonus infraspinatus) is a fish in the family Agonidae. It was described by Charles Henry Gilbert in 1904.

It is a marine, temperate water-dwelling fish which is known from the eastern Pacific Ocean, including the coast of the Bering Sea in Alaska, and Eureka, California, USA. It dwells at a depth range of 18–183 metres. Males can reach a maximum total length of 12 centimetres.
