= Smooth-eye poacher =

Scientific classification
- Kingdom: Animalia
- Phylum: Chordata
- Class: Actinopterygii
- Order: Perciformes
- Suborder: Cottoidei
- Family: Agonidae
- Genus: Xeneretmus
- Species: X. leiops

Binomial name
- Xeneretmus leiops Gilbert, 1915

Species of fish

The smooth-eye poacher (Xeneretmus leiops) is a fish in the family Agonidae. It was described by Charles Henry Gilbert in 1915. It is a marine, Temperate water-dwelling fish which is known from southern British Columbia, Canada to southern California, USA, in the eastern Pacific Ocean. It dwells at a depth range of 37–399 metres. Males can reach a maximum total length of 24 centimetres.
