= Spinynose sculpin =

Scientific classification
- Kingdom: Animalia
- Phylum: Chordata
- Class: Actinopterygii
- Order: Perciformes
- Suborder: Cottoidei
- Superfamily: Cottoidea
- Family: Psychrolutidae
- Genus: Asemichthys; Gilbert, 1912
- Species: A. taylori

Binomial name
- Asemichthys taylori Jordan & Gilbert, 1912

Synonyms
- Radulinus taylori (Gilbert, 1912)

Species of marine ray-finned fish

The spinynose sculpin (Asemichthys taylori) is a species of marine ray-finned fish belonging to the family Cottidae, the typical sculpins. It is found in the northeastern Pacific Ocean from Alaska south to Washington and the San Juan Islands. The spinynose sculpin is the only species in the monospecific genus Asemichthys. This sculpin lays its eggs on the egg masses of the buffalo sculpin (Enophrys bison), thought to be a strategy to take advantage of the larger fish’s egg guarding behaviour.

== Taxonomy ==
The spinynose sculpin was first formally described as Radulinus taylori in 1912 by the American ichthyologists David Starr Jordan and Charles Henry Gilbert. In the same year Gilbert reclassified this species in the monospecific genus Asemichthys. The 5th edition of Fishes of the World classifies the genus Asemichthys within the subfamily Cottinae of the family Cottidae, however, other authors classify the genus within the subfamily Radulininae of the family Psychrolutidae.
