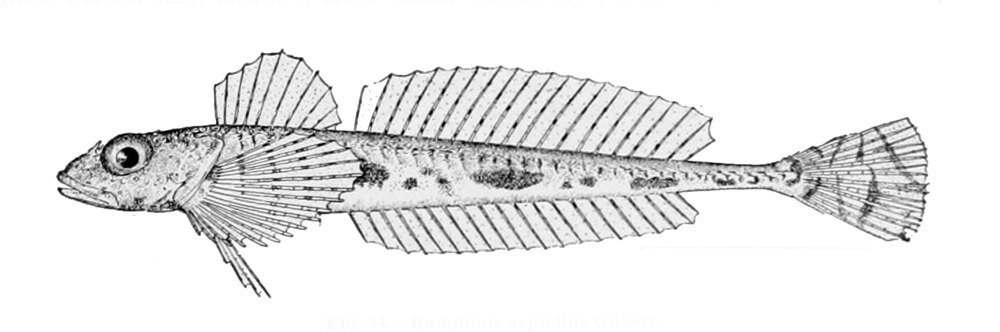
- Slim sculpin (R. asprellus)

Scientific classification
- Kingdom: Animalia
- Phylum: Chordata
- Class: Actinopterygii
- Order: Perciformes
- Suborder: Cottoidei
- Family: Psychrolutidae
- Genus: Radulinus; C. H. Gilbert, 1890

Type species
- Radulinus asprellus Gilbert, 1890

Synonyms
- Radulinellus Bolin, 1950

= Radulinus =

Genus of fishes

Radulinus is a genus of marine ray-finned fishes belonging to the family Cottidae, the typical sculpins. These fishes are found in the eastern Pacific Ocean.

== Taxonomy ==
Radulinus was first proposed as a monospecific genus in 1890 by the American ichthyologist Charles Henry Gilbertwhen he described the slim sculpin (R. asprellus) from waters off the "northwestern U.S.A.". The 5th edition of Fishes of the World classifies the genus Artediellus within the subfamily Cottinae of the family Cottidae, however, other authors classify the genus within the subfamily Radulininae of the family Psychrolutidae.

== Species ==
There are currently three recognized species in this genus:

- Radulinus asprellus Gilbert, 1890 (Slim sculpin)
- Radulinus boleoides Gilbert, 1898 (Darter sculpin)
- Radulinus vinculus Bolin, 1950 (Smoothgum sculpin)
