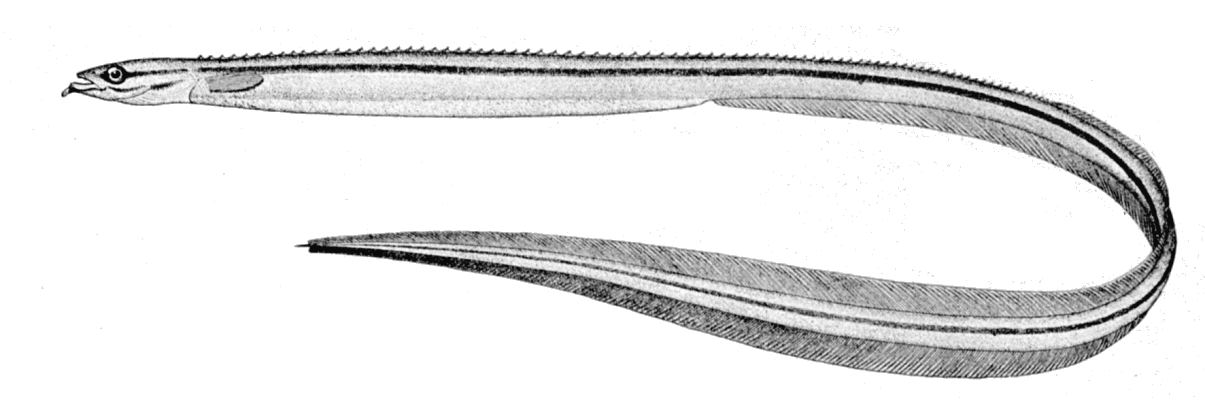

Scientific classification
- Kingdom: Animalia
- Phylum: Chordata
- Class: Actinopterygii
- Order: Perciformes
- Suborder: Zoarcoidei
- Family: Ptilichthyidae; Jordan & Gilbert, 1883
- Genus: Ptilichthys; Bean, 1881
- Species: P. goodei

Binomial name
- Ptilichthys goodei Bean, 1881

= Quillfish =

Species of fish

The quillfish (Ptilichthys goodei) is a species of marine ray-finned fish, it is the only species in the genus Ptilichthys and family Ptilichthyidae. This fish occurs in the northern North Pacific Ocean.

== Taxonomy ==
The quillfish was first formally described in 1881 by the American ichthyologist Tarleton Hoffman Bean with its type locality given as the entrance to Port Levasheff in Unalaska in the Aleutian Islands of Alaska. Bean also proposed the monotypic genus Ptilichthys when he described this species. In 1883 David Starr Jordan and Charles Henry Gilbert classified Bean's genus in a monogeneric family, the Ptilichthyidae. The 5th edition of Fishes of the World classifies this family within the suborder Zoarcoidei, within the order Scorpaeniformes. Other authorities classify this family in the infraorder Zoarcales within the suborder Cottoidei of the Perciformes because removing the Scorpaeniformes from the Perciformes renders that taxon non monophyletic.

== Etymology ==
The generic name Ptilichthys is a combination of ptilon, which is Greek for "quill" with ichthys. meaning "fish", an allusion to the feather-like appearance of this fish, being extremely elongate, slender and with long dorsal and anal fins. The specific name honours the American ichthyologist George Brown Goode, who was a colleague and collaborator of Bean's.

== Description ==
The Quillfish has an extremely elongate, slender body with lon-based tall dorsal and anal fins which make the fish similar in shape to the primary feather of a bird or a quill pen. The small head is only between 4 and 7% of the length of the body and there is a wide fleshy appendage at the front of the lower jaw. The dorsal fin has its origin on the nape and has between 79 and 90 low spines, free of the fin membrane, followed by between 130 and 157 soft rays. The anal fin has its origin at around a third of the body length, contains 166 to 196 soft rays. Both the dorsal fins are joined to the much reduced caudal fin. As the fish grows the caudal fin has a fleshy extension which extends and becomes more or less filamentous. It has rounded pectoral fins but no pelvic fins and lacks a pelvic girdle. There is a single pair of nostrils. The minute cycloid scales are scattered or may be absent. The sharp, conical teeth are present in the jaw, arranged in a dense single row, but there are no other teeth. There is no pyloric caeca or swim bladder. The overall colour may be yellow or orange to greenish gray, and the body is rather translucent. There is a dark streak along body with others on head in preserved specimens. Attains up to 39 cm length not including caudal filament. The species attains a maximum published total length of 40 cm (16 in).

== Distribution and habitat ==
The quillfish occurs in the northern North Pacific Ocean from the Bering Sea in the north and south to Oregon in the eastern Pacific and to the Sea of Japan and Sea of Okhotsk in the western Pacific. They are demersal fish which arefound at depths between 0 and 360 m (0 and 1,181 ft).

== Biology ==
Quillfish have been found on the surface at night, attracted by the lights of fishing boats, but little is known about its daytime habits; it may burrow in sandy and muddy bottoms during the day, emerging at dusk to feed and they are attracted to artificial lights.

Quillfishes have been found in the stomachs of juvenile Coho salmon, Oncorhynchus kisutch, and Chinook salmon, Oncorhynchus tshawytscha. The longest quillfish was nearly as long (82%) as its predator.

== See also ==
- George Brown Goode
