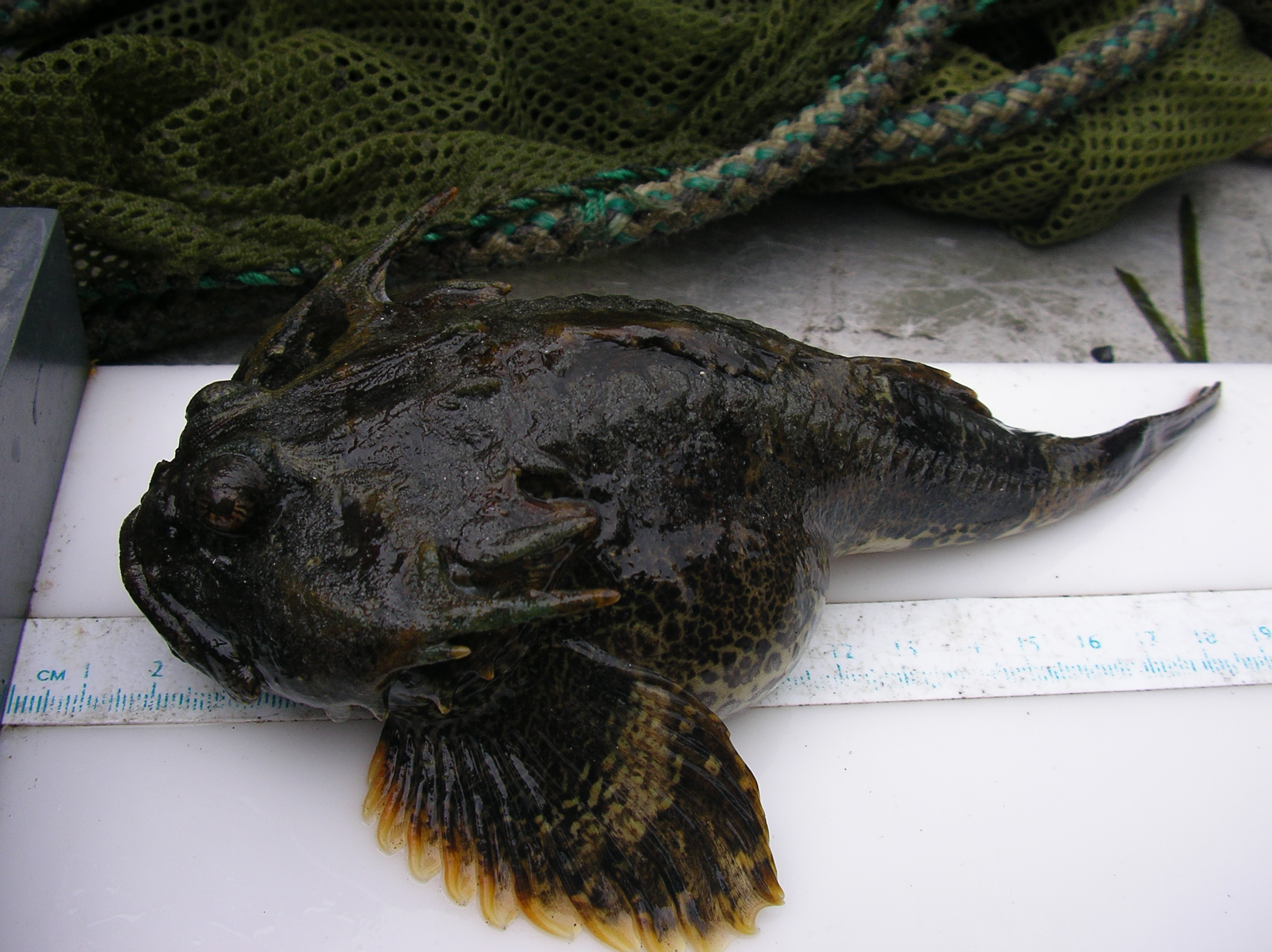

Scientific classification
- Kingdom: Animalia
- Phylum: Chordata
- Class: Actinopterygii
- Order: Perciformes
- Suborder: Cottoidei
- Family: Psychrolutidae
- Genus: Enophrys
- Species: E. bison

Binomial name
- Enophrys bison (Girard, 1854)

Synonyms
- Aspicottus bison Girard, 1854

= Enophrys bison =

Species of fish

Enophrys bison, the buffalo sculpin, is a species of marine ray-finned fish, belonging to the family Cottidae, the typical sculpins. It is found in the eastern Pacific Ocean.

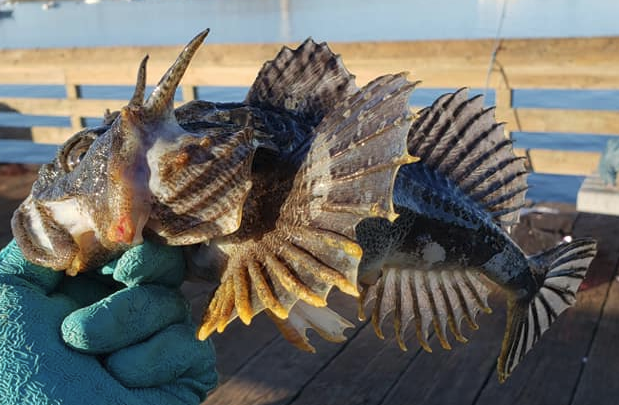
A buffalo sculpin caught in Half Moon Bay, California

== Taxonomy ==
The buffalo sculpin was first formally described as Aspicottus bison in 1854 by the French zoologist Charles Frédéric Girard with its type locality given as San Francisco. The specific name bison is presumed to refer to the long preopercular spines, similar to the horns of an American bison (Bison bison).

== Description ==
The buffalo sculpin has a dorsal fins which are supported by between 7 and 9 spines and between 10 and 13 soft rays while the anal fin has 8 or 9 soft rays. The pelvic fins are small and the caudal fin is rounded. This species reaches a maximum published total length of 37 cm (15 in). This species is well-camouflaged and has a mottled pattern, which varies from pink and green to brown in colour, and there are dark saddle patches along the back. There is a long, straight preopercular spine projecting from each cheek. The lateral line is made up of prominent raised plates. The snout is short and blunt.

== Distribution and habitat ==
This fish species occurs in the Eastern Pacific Ocean, from Kodiak Island, Alaska, to Monterey Bay, California, USA. They are typically found in rocky or sandy reef environments, where they can camouflage themselves in rocks and seaweed. These fish commonly inhabit a depths down to 20 m (66 ft), though the deepest recorded depth is at 220 m (720 ft).

== Biology ==
Buffalo Sculpin are predators and prey on a variety of animals including young fishes, mussels, isopods, amphipods, and crabs. Algae are frequently recorded among its gut contents, but it is not clear that this is consumed deliberately or by accident when the fish grabs prey. It is an oviparous fish in which there is paternal care. They spawn in the late winter through to early spring, the female laying her eggs on rocks or on artificial structures in the lower part of the intertidal zone down as far as 12 m (39 ft) in depth. The eggs are laid in batches of 19,000 – 32,000 in exposed places, subject to the current. A number of females frequently spawn with a single male which then guards the eggs and fans them with his pectoral fins. The larvae emerge after 5 or 6 weeks. The spinynose sculpin (Asemichthys taylori) lays its eggs on the egg masses of this species, thought to be a strategy to take advantage of the buffalo sculpin's egg guarding behaviour.
