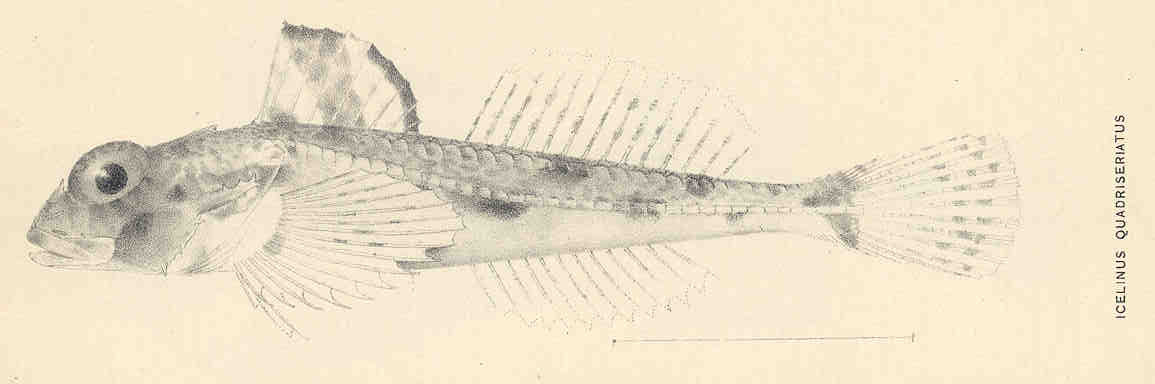
- Yellowchin sculpin (I. quadriseriatus)
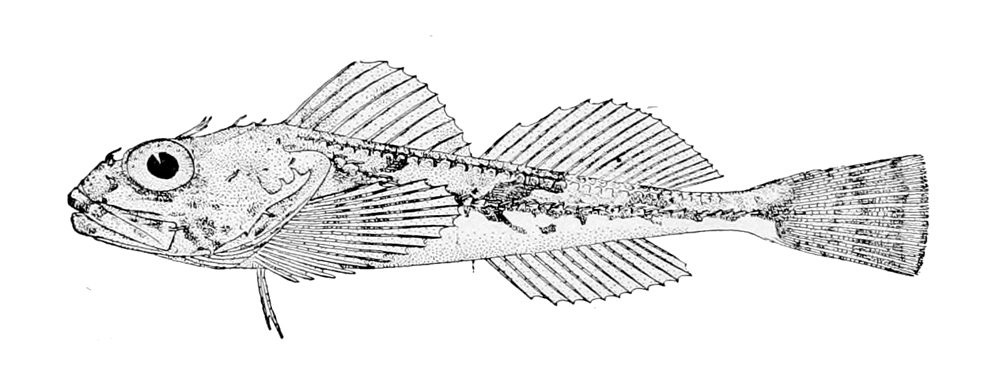
- Northern Sculpin (I. borealis)

Scientific classification
- Kingdom: Animalia
- Phylum: Chordata
- Class: Actinopterygii
- Order: Perciformes
- Suborder: Cottoidei
- Family: Psychrolutidae
- Genus: Icelinus; Jordan, 1885

Type species
- Artedius quadriseriatus Lockington, 1880

Synonyms
- Medicelinus Bolin, 1936; Penicelinus Bolin, 1936; Tarandichthys Jordan & Evermann, 1896

= Icelinus =

Genus of fishes

Icelinus is a genus of marine ray-finned fishes belonging to the family Cottidae, the typical sculpins. These fishes are found in the northern and eastern Pacific Ocean.

== Taxonomy ==
Icelinus was first proposed as a monospecific genus in 1885 by the American ichthyologist David Starr Jordan with its only and type species being Artedius quadriseriatus. This species had been described in 1880 by the English zoologist William Neale Lockington from San Francisco. The 5th edition of Fishes of the World classifies this genus within the subfamily Cottinae of the family Cottidae, however, other authors classify the genus within the subfamily Oligocottinae of the family Psychrolutidae. The genus Icelinus may not be monophyletic as a study found that the 9 eastern Pacific species were in a clade which was a sister taxon to the genera Furcina and Antipodocottus while the 2 northwestern Pacific species (I. japonicus and I. pietschi) were found to be so closely related to the genus Stlengis that they were placed within that genus, leaving Icelinus confined to the eastern Pacific.

== Etymology ==
Icelinus is a diminutive of Icelus, the genus I. quadriseriatus was thought to belong to.

== Species ==
There are currently 11 recognized species in this genus:

- Icelinus borealis C. H. Gilbert, 1896 (Northern sculpin)
- Icelinus burchami Evermann & Goldsborough, 1907 (Dusky sculpin)
- Icelinus cavifrons C. H. Gilbert, 1890 (Pit-head sculpin)
- Icelinus filamentosus C. H. Gilbert, 1890 (Threadfin sculpin)
- Icelinus fimbriatus C. H. Gilbert, 1890 (Fringed sculpin)
- Icelinus japonicus Yabe, Tsumura & Katayama, 1980
- Icelinus limbaughi Rosenblatt & W. L. Smith, 2004 (Canyon sculpin)
- Icelinus oculatus C. H. Gilbert, 1890 (Frogmouth sculpin)
- Icelinus pietschi Yabe, Soma & Amaoka, 2001
- Icelinus quadriseriatus (Lockington, 1880) (Yellowchin sculpin)
- Icelinus tenuis C. H. Gilbert, 1890 (Spotfin sculpin)

== Characteristics ==
Icelinus sculpins are characterised by having the fourth uppermost spine on the preoperculum having a number of points like the antler of a deer. They have a single spine and 2 soft rays in the pelvic fin and there are two rows of ctenoid scales along the dorsal fin bases. These are small fishes, the largest species in the genus is I. filamentosus, which has a maximum published total length of 27 cm (11 in), while the smallest is I. piestchi which has a maximum published standard length of 4.2 cm (1.7 in).

== Distribution ==
Icelinus sculpins are found in the northern and eastern Pacific Ocean. They are inshore fishes.
