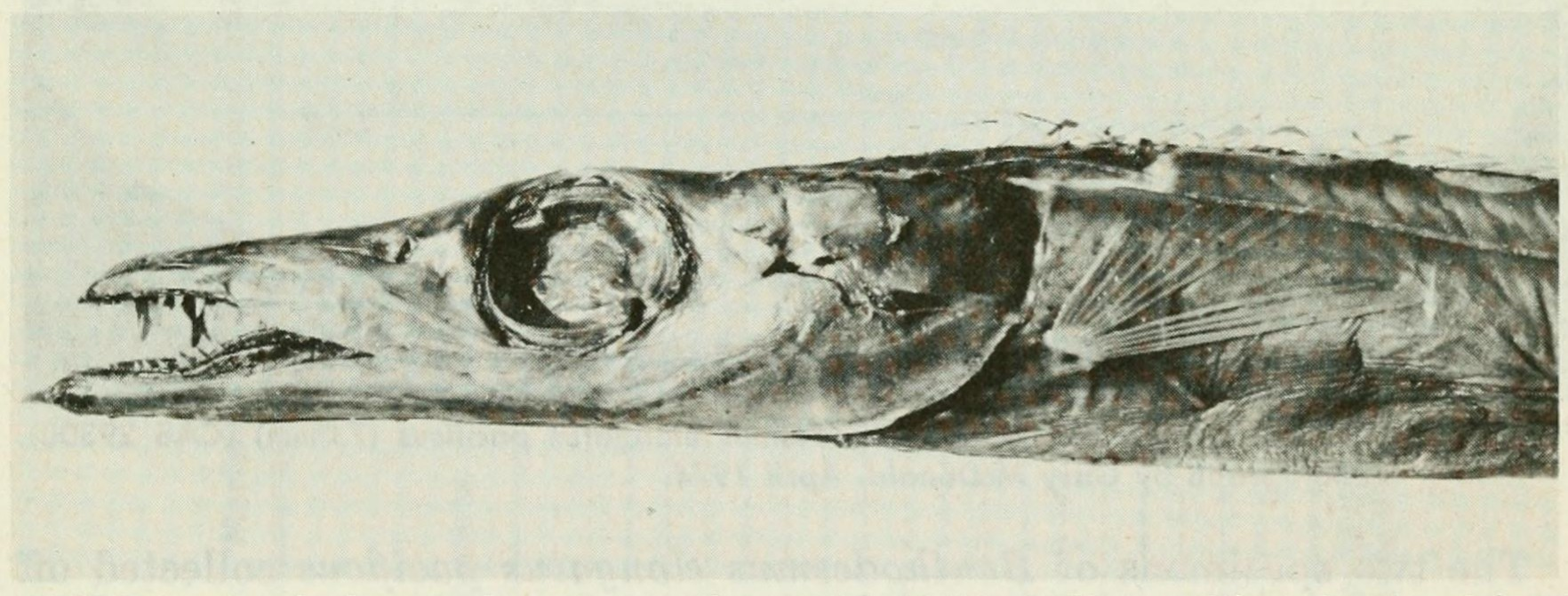

Scientific classification
- Kingdom: Animalia
- Phylum: Chordata
- Class: Actinopterygii
- Order: Scombriformes
- Family: Trichiuridae
- Genus: Benthodesmus
- Species: B. pacificus

Binomial name
- Benthodesmus pacificus Parin & Becker, 1970

= North Pacific frostfish =

Species of fish

The North Pacific frostfish, Benthodesmus pacificus, is a cutlassfish of the family Trichiuridae found in the north Pacific Ocean between latitudes 50° N and 30° N at depths of 100–1,000 metres (330–3,280 ft). Its length is up to 112 centimetres (44 in).
