= Pygmy poacher =

Scientific classification
- Kingdom: Animalia
- Phylum: Chordata
- Class: Actinopterygii
- Order: Perciformes
- Suborder: Cottoidei
- Family: Agonidae
- Subfamily: Bathyagoninae
- Genus: Odontopyxis; Lockington, 1880
- Species: O. trispinosa

Binomial name
- Odontopyxis trispinosa Lockington, 1880

Species of fish

The pygmy poacher (Odontopyxis trispinosa) is a species of poacher that is native to the eastern Pacific Ocean along the North American coast from southern Alaska to northern Mexico. This species occurs at depths of from 9 to 373 metres (30 to 1,224 ft). This species grows to a length of 9.5 centimetres (3.7 in) TL. This species is commonly displayed in public aquariums. This species is the only known member of its genus.
