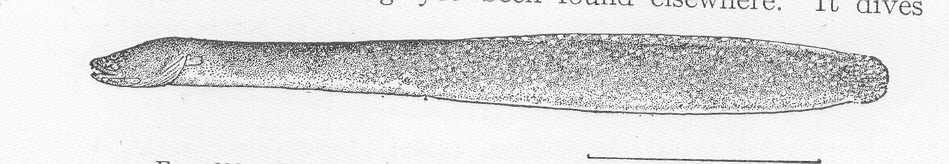

Scientific classification
- Kingdom: Animalia
- Phylum: Chordata
- Class: Actinopterygii
- Order: Perciformes
- Suborder: Zoarcoidei
- Family: Scytalinidae; Jordan & Starks, 1895
- Genus: Scytalina; Jordan & Gilbert, 1880
- Species: S. cerdale

Binomial name
- Scytalina cerdale Jordan & Gilbert, 1880

= Graveldiver =

Genus of fishes

The graveldiver (Scytalina cerdale) is a species of scorpaeniform fish, the only species in the genus Scytalina and the family Scytalinidae. Graveldivers are small, with snake-like heads (hence the generic name). Their bodies are compact, and lack pelvic fins, with very small pectoral fins. Their range encompasses the coastal area from the Bering Sea to central California.

== Taxonomy and etymology ==
The graveldiver is the only species in the family Scytalinidae and the 5th edition of Fishes of the World classifies this family within the suborder Zoarcoidei, within the order Scorpaeniformes. Other authorities classify this family in the infraorder Zoarcales within the suborder Cottoidei of the Perciformes because removing the Scorpaeniformes from the Perciformes renders that taxon non monophyletic.

The generic name Scytalina is of a Greek origin, from the diminutive of skytale, meaning "viper". This refers to the snake-like head. The specific name cerdale means "wary one" or "the fox", in allusion to its agility and quick movement when disturbed. Jordan and Gilbert suggested an alternative generic name Scytaliscus due to the similarity between Scytalina and the unrelated genus Scytalinus. This name is unnecessary and is not in wide use.

== Description ==
Graveldivers are small fish, reaching lengths of only 15 cm (5.9 in), but usually not exceeding 10 centimetres (3.9 in). They are long and compressed, resembling blennies. The head is snake-like, and the dorsal fins and anal fins have no soft rays, and are supported only by thin spines. Each has 41–51 spines, originating deep in the skin. They are at opposite sides of the body. The dorsal and anal fins converge at the rounded caudal fin. The pectoral fins are very small, with only about eight rays, and the pelvic fins and girdle are absent altogether. Graveldivers have no lateral lines, scales, pyloric caeca, or swim bladders. They are pinkish-brown in colour, and may bear some purple markings. The edge of the caudal (tail) fin is reddish-orange.

== Distribution and habitat ==
Graveldivers are marine fish found in the cold northern and eastern Pacific Ocean, from the Bering Sea on the Alaskan coast to Diablo Cave in central California. They are demersal fish, occurring in tidal pools and rocky bottoms. They may burrow under rocks and substrates such as sand, gravel, and broken shells, hence their name. They may burrow to depths of 25 feet (7.6 m) or more. Graveldivers generally inhabit shallow intertidal and subtidal areas.
