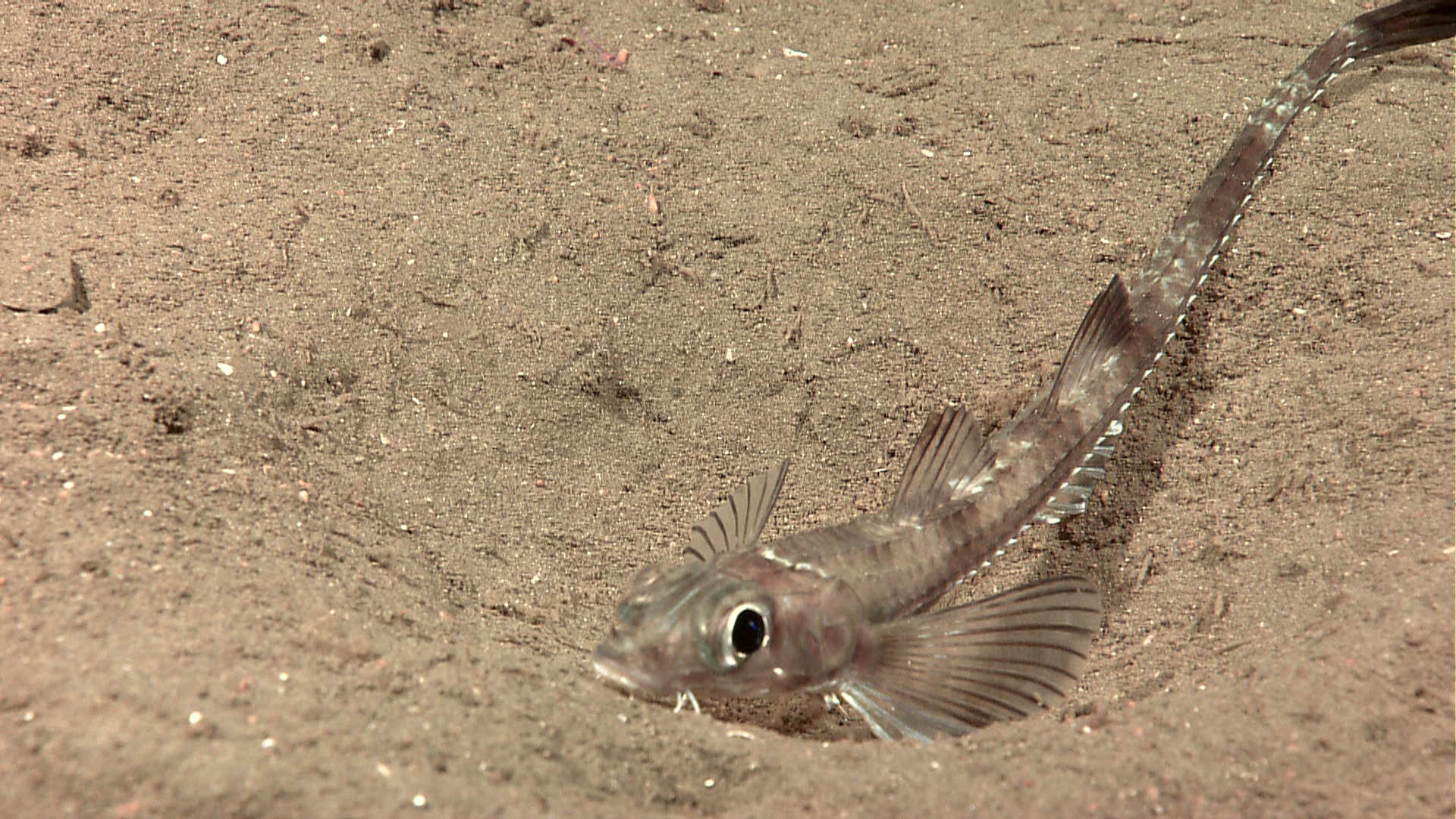
- Xeneretmus latifrons

Scientific classification
- Kingdom: Animalia
- Phylum: Chordata
- Class: Actinopterygii
- Order: Perciformes
- Suborder: Cottoidei
- Family: Agonidae
- Subfamily: Bathyagoninae
- Genus: Xeneretmus; C. H. Gilbert, 1903

= Xeneretmus =

Genus of fishes

Xeneretmus is a genus of poachers native to the eastern Pacific Ocean.

== Species ==
There are currently four recognized species in this genus:

- Xeneretmus latifrons (C. H. Gilbert, 1890) (blacktip poacher)
- Xeneretmus leiops C. H. Gilbert, 1915 (smooth-eye poacher)
- Xeneretmus ritteri C. H. Gilbert, 1915 (stripefin poacher)
- Xeneretmus triacanthus (C. H. Gilbert, 1890) (blue-spotted poacher)
