= Gray starsnout =

Scientific classification
- Domain: Eukaryota
- Kingdom: Animalia
- Phylum: Chordata
- Class: Actinopterygii
- Order: Perciformes
- Suborder: Cottoidei
- Family: Agonidae
- Genus: Bathyagonus
- Species: B. alascanus

Binomial name
- Bathyagonus alascanus (Gilbert, 1896)

Synonyms
- Xenochirus alascanus Gilbert, 1896; Asterotheca alascana (Gilbert, 1896); Bathyagonus alascana (Gilbert, 1896); Xenertmus alascanus (Gilbert, 1896)

Species of fish

The gray starsnout (Bathyagonus alascanus), also known as the gray starsnout poacher in the United States, is a fish in the family Agonidae. It was described by Charles Henry Gilbert in 1896. It is a marine, temperate water-dwelling fish which is known from the eastern Pacific Ocean, from the coast of the Bering Sea in Alaska, to the Oregon-California border. It dwells at a depth range of 18–252 metres, and inhabits rocky areas. Males can reach a maximum total length of 13 centimetres.

The species epithet "alascanus" refers to the species' type locality in Alaska. The Gray starsnout is preyed on by the Pacific cod (Gadus macrocephalus).
