= Bigeye poacher =

Scientific classification
- Domain: Eukaryota
- Kingdom: Animalia
- Phylum: Chordata
- Class: Actinopterygii
- Order: Perciformes
- Suborder: Cottoidei
- Family: Agonidae
- Genus: Bathyagonus
- Species: B. pentacanthus

Binomial name
- Bathyagonus pentacanthus (Gilbert, 1890)

Synonyms
- Xenochirus pentacanthus Gilbert, 1890; Asterotheca pentacantha (Gilbert, 1890); Asterotheca pentacanthus (Gilbert, 1890); Xenertmus pentacanthus (Gilbert, 1890)

Species of fish

The bigeye poacher (Bathyagonus pentacanthus), also known commonly as the bigeye starsnout or the bigeye starsnout poacher, is a fish in the family Agonidae. It was described by Charles Henry Gilbert in 1890. It is a marine, subtropical fish which is known from the Gulf of Alaska to southern California, USA, in the northern Pacific Ocean. It dwells at a depth range of 110–910 metres, and inhabits soft bottoms. Males can reach a maximum total length of 23 centimetres.

The bigeye poacher is preyed on by the Pacific cod (Gadus macrocephalus).
