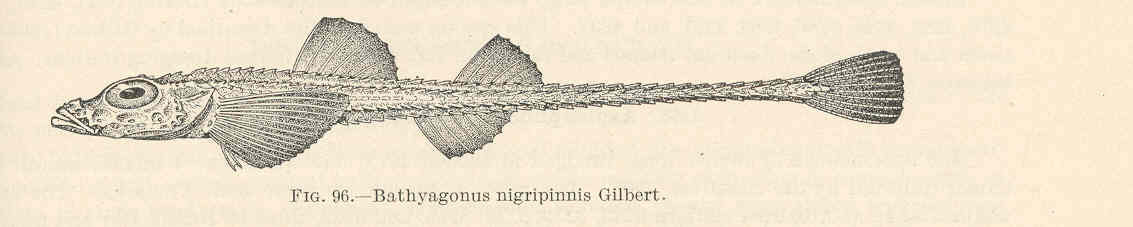

Scientific classification
- Domain: Eukaryota
- Kingdom: Animalia
- Phylum: Chordata
- Class: Actinopterygii
- Order: Perciformes
- Suborder: Cottoidei
- Family: Agonidae
- Genus: Bathyagonus
- Species: B. nigripinnis

Binomial name
- Bathyagonus nigripinnis Gilbert, 1890

= Blackfin poacher =

Species of fish

The blackfin poacher (Bathyagonus nigripinnis), also known as the blackfin starsnout poacher in the United States, is a fish in the family Agonidae. It was described by Charles Henry Gilbert in 1890. It is a marine, boreal water-dwelling fish which is known from the northern Pacific Ocean, including Komandorski Island and Avachin Bay in Russia, St. Mathew Island in the Bering Sea, and Eureka, California, USA. It dwells at a depth range of 18–1290 metres, most often at around 400–700 m, and inhabits soft bottoms. It is known to live for a maximum of 9 years. Males can reach a maximum total length of 24.2 centimetres, but more commonly reach a TL of 20 cm.

The blackfin poacher is preyed on by the sablefish (Anoplopoma fimbria) and the Aleutian skate (Bathyraja aleutica).
