= Blobfish =

Blobfish may refer to:

- Psychrolutidae, a fish family commonly known as blobfishes
  - Psychrolutes microporos, commonly known as a blobfish or fathead
    - Mr Blobby (fish), an individual specimen of Psychrolutes microporos and the subject of a well-known photograph
  - Psychrolutes marcidus, commonly known as a smooth-head blobfish or simply a blobfish
  - Psychrolutes occidentalis, Western blobfish or Western Australian sculpin
  - Psychrolutes phrictus, blob sculpin, also commonly known as a blobfish
- Ebinania, a genus of fish
