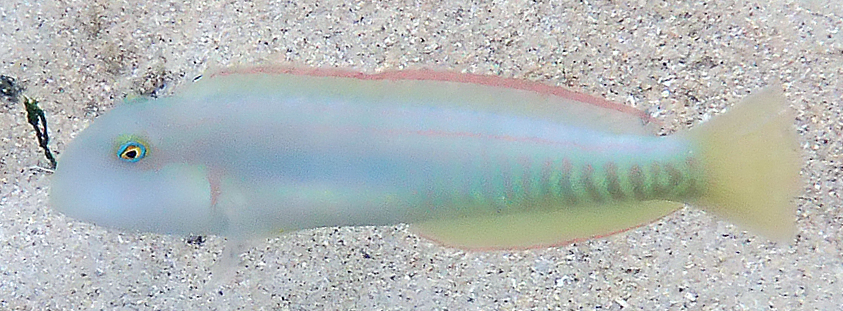

Conservation status
- Least Concern (IUCN 3.1)

Scientific classification
- Kingdom: Animalia
- Phylum: Chordata
- Class: Actinopterygii
- Order: Labriformes
- Family: Labridae
- Genus: Cymolutes
- Species: C. praetextatus

Binomial name
- Cymolutes praetextatus (Quoy & Gaimard, 1834)

Synonyms
- Julis praetextata Quoy & Gaimard, 1834

= Cymolutes praetextatus =

Species of fish

Cymolutes praetextatus, the knife razorfish or knife wrasse, is a species of ray-finned fish from the family Labridae, the wrasses. It occurs in the Indo-Pacific where it occurs over reef flats and in shallow lagoons.

== Description ==
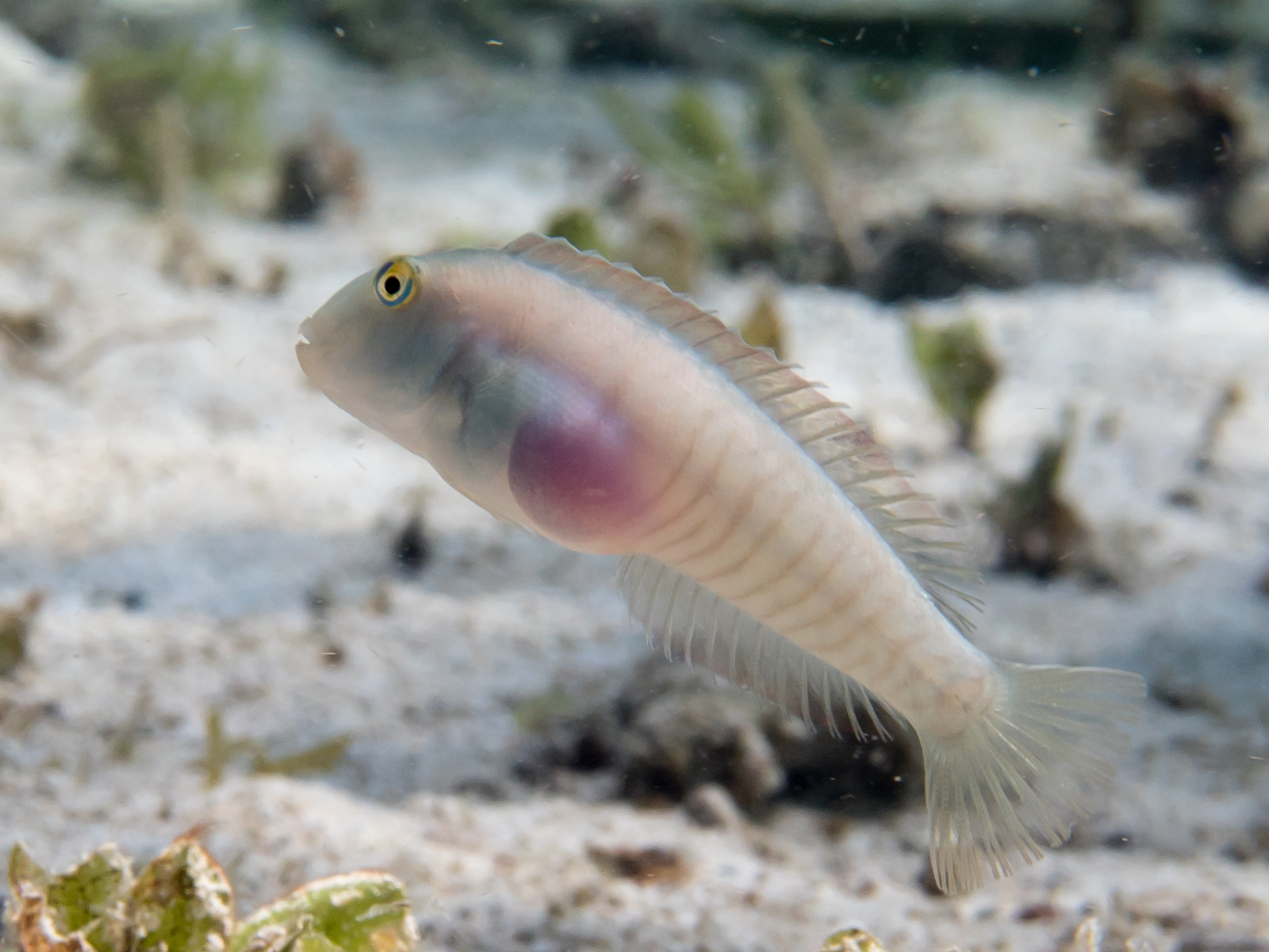
In Indonesia

Cymolutes praetextatus is a pale coloured wrasse which has steep profile to its head. The flanks are marked with indistinct whitish bars and there is a white stripe along its back which sits above a wide, yellowish or darker coloured stripe, although this may not be present.

This species has 9-10 spines in its dorsal fin which also has 12-13 soft rays while the anal fin has 2-3 spines and 11-12 soft rays. The largest males grow to a standard length of 20 centimetres (7.9 in).

== Distribution ==
Cymolutes praetextatus is an Indo-Pacific species which is found from the eastern coast of Africa through the Indian Ocean and into the Pacific Ocean as far as the Society Islands, the Line Islands and Hawaii. In Australian waters it occurs at Ningaloo Reef, Rowley Shoals and Scott Reef in Western Australia, Ashmore Reef in the Timor Sea, and the Great Barrier Reef in Queensland, it also occurs around Norfolk Island in the Tasman Sea and the Cocos (Keeling) Islands.

== Habitat and biology ==
Cymolutes praetextatus is a solitary fish which lives over reef flats and in shallow lagoons, where there are sandy areas which have rubble and weed and are swept by currents. Its diet consists mainly of small benthic invertebrates. When this species perceives danger it can dive into the sand to hide.

== Human uses ==
This species is rarely caught by fisheries and does not appear often in the aquarium trade.

== Species description and taxonomy ==
Cymolutes praetextatus was originally described as Julis praetextata in 1834 by the French zoologists Quoy & Gaimard from type material collected off Mauritius on the voyage of the Astrolabe. When Albert Günther created the genus Cymolutes he named C. praetextatus as its type species.
