= Blue and gold fusilier =

Blue and gold fusilier is a common name for several fishes and may refer to:

- Caesio caerulaurea
- Caesio teres
