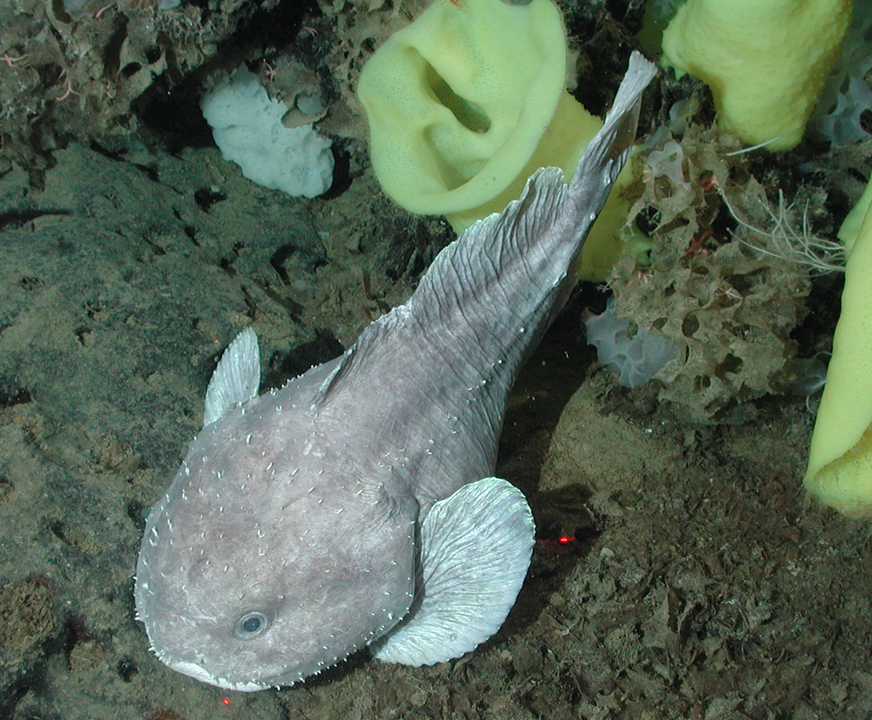
- Blob sculpin, Psychrolutes phrictus

Scientific classification
- Kingdom: Animalia
- Phylum: Chordata
- Class: Actinopterygii
- Division: Teleostei
- Order: Perciformes
- Suborder: Cottoidei
- Family: Psychrolutidae
- Genus: Psychrolutes; Günther, 1861

Type species
- Psychrolutes paradoxus Günther, 1861

Species
- See text

Synonyms
- Cottunculoides Barnard, 1927; Gilbertidia Berg, 1898; Gilbertina Jordan & Starks, 1895; Platycottus Schmidt, 1935

= Psychrolutes =

Genus of fishes

Psychrolutes is a genus of marine ray-finned fishes belonging to the family Psychrolutidae, the fatheads and toadfishes. Though found predominantly in the deep sea, a handful of species are present in the intertidal regions of the North Pacific rim. In June 2003, During the NORFANZ Expedition north-west of New Zealand, scientists trawled a specimen of P. microporos at a depth between 1,013 metres (3,323 ft) and 1,340 metres (4,400 ft) on the Norfolk Ridge.

== Species ==
There are currently 12 recognized species in this genus:

- Psychrolutes dolganovi (Mandrytsa, 1993)
- Psychrolutes inermis (Vaillant, 1888)
- Psychrolutes macrocephalus (Gilchrist, 1904)
- Psychrolutes marcidus (McCulloch, 1926) (blobfish)
- Psychrolutes marmoratus (T. N. Gill, 1889)
- Psychrolutes microporos J. S. Nelson, 1995 (blobfish)
- Psychrolutes occidentalis R. Fricke, 1990 (Western Australian sculpin)
- Psychrolutes paradoxus Günther, 1861 (Tadpole sculpin)
- Psychrolutes phrictus Stein & C. E. Bond, 1978 (blob sculpin)
- Psychrolutes pustulosus (Schmidt, 1937)
- Psychrolutes sigalutes (D. S. Jordan & Starks, 1895) (soft sculpin)
- Psychrolutes sio J. S. Nelson, 1980

Catalog of Fishes classifies Gilbertidia as a synonym of Psychrolutes, but FishBase treats it as a valid genus.
