= Scott Reef =

Scott Reef may refer to:

- Scott Reefs northwest of Australia, see Scott and Seringapatam Reefs
- A reef close to Sala y Gomez, a remote Pacific island belonging to Chile
