= Gilbertidia =

Scientific classification
- Kingdom: Animalia
- Phylum: Chordata
- Class: Actinopterygii
- Order: Perciformes
- Suborder: Cottoidei
- Family: Psychrolutidae
- Genus: Gilbertidia; Berg, 1898

Type species
- Gilbertina sigalutes D. S. Jordan & Starks, 1895

Synonyms
- Gilbertina Jordan & Starks, 1895

Genus of fishes

Gilbertidia is a genus of marine ray-finned fishes belonging to the family Psychrolutidae, the fatheads and toadfishes. These fishes are found in the northern Pacific Ocean.

== Taxonomy ==
Gilberitidia was first proposed as a genus name by the Argentinian-Latvian naturalist and entomologist Carlos Berg in 1898 as a replacement name for Gilbertina, a name proposed in 1895 by the American ichthyologists David Starr Jordan and Edwin Chapin Starks. which was invalid under the ICZN as it was preoccupied by the gastropod fossil genus Gilbertina Morlet, 1888. The type species is Gilbertina sigalutes which is a synonym of Psychrolutes sigalutes and this would normally mean that Gilbertina is a synonym of Psychrolutes. In 1935 Peter Schmidt proposed the genus Platycottus for Gilbertidia pustulosa, however, Catalog of Fishes treats this as a synonym of Psychrolutes as well.

== Species ==
There are currently two recognized species in this genus:

- Gilbertidia dolganovi Mandritsa, 1993
- Gilbertidia pustulosa P. J. Schmidt, 1937
