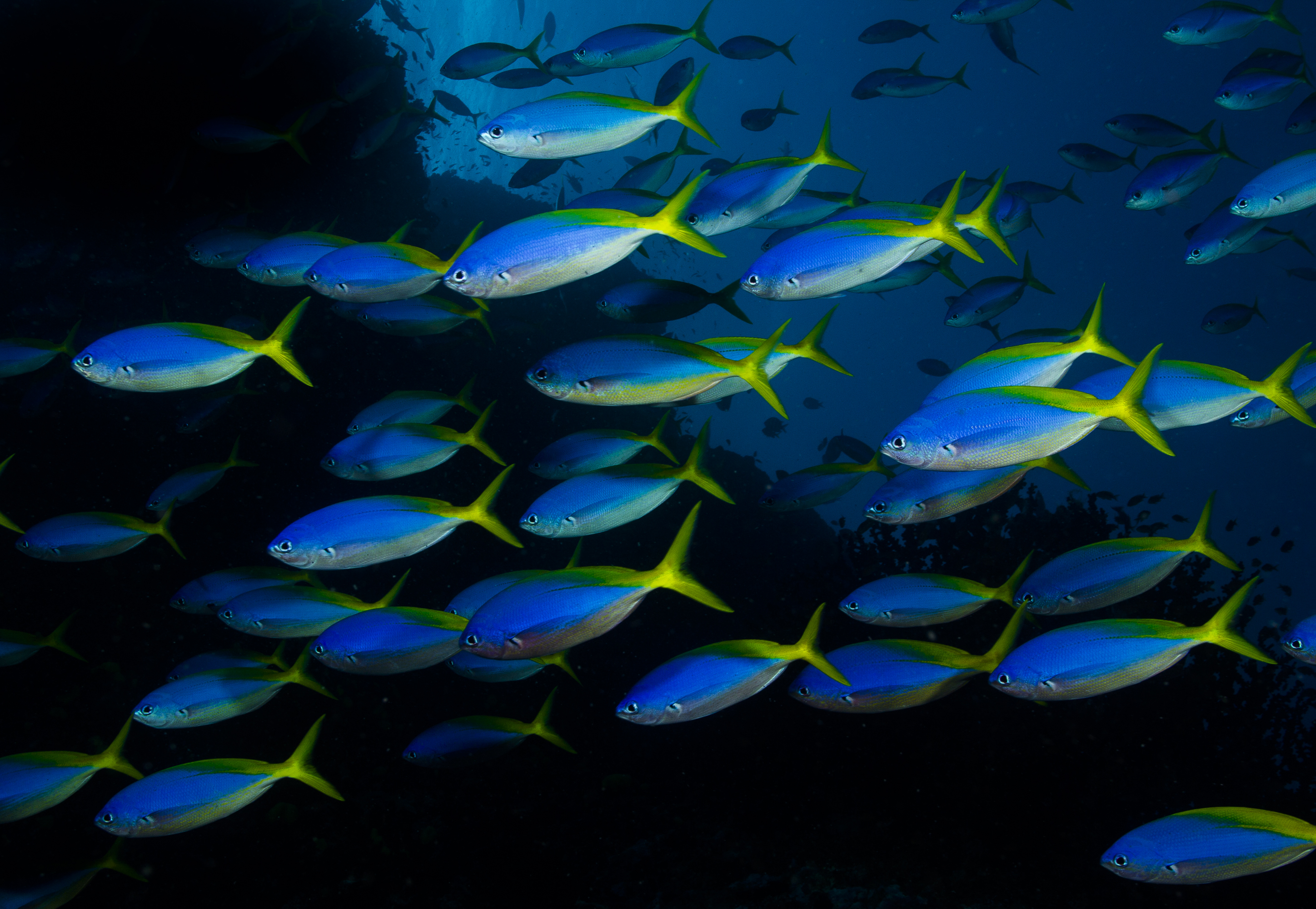
- A school of Caesio teres in Fiji

Conservation status
- Least Concern (IUCN 3.1)

Scientific classification
- Kingdom: Animalia
- Phylum: Chordata
- Class: Actinopterygii
- Order: Acanthuriformes
- Family: Lutjanidae
- Genus: Caesio
- Species: C. teres

Binomial name
- Caesio teres Seale, 1906

Synonyms
- Caesio pulcherrima Smith & Smith, 1963

= Caesio teres =

Species of fish

Caesio teres, the yellow and blueback fusilier, beautiful fusilier, blue and gold fusilier (not to be confused with Caesio caerulaurea) or yellow-tail fusilier, is a species of marine, pelagic ray-finned fish belonging to the family Caesionidae. It occurs in the Indian and Western Pacific Oceans.

== Taxonomy ==
Caesio teres was first formally described in 1906 by the American ichthyologist Alvin Seale with the type locality given as Shortland Island in the Solomon Islands. This species has been placed in the subgenus Flavicaesio. The specific name teres means "cylindrical", a reference to the cylindrical cross-section of the body compared to C. lunaris.

== Description ==
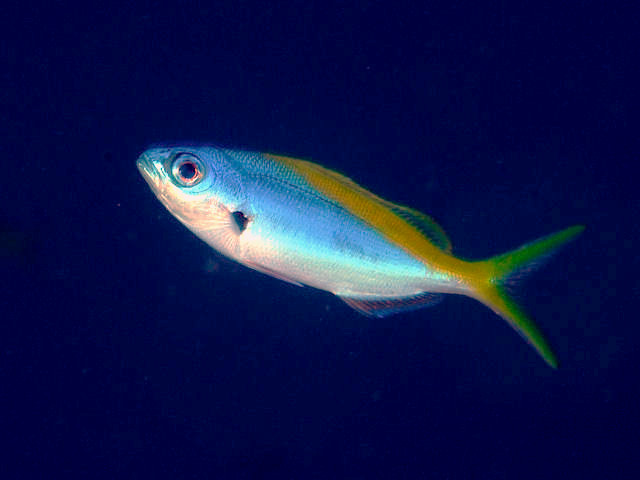
C. teres

Caesio teres has a moderately deep, fusiform and laterally compressed body. The dorsal fin has 10 spines and 14–16, typically 15, soft rays while the anal fin contains 3 spines and 12–13 soft rays. The pectoral fins contain 20–22, typically 21 rays. This species attains a maximum total length of 40 cm (16 in), although 26.6 cm (10.5 in) is more typical. The upper back and the rear part of the dorsal fin are bright yellow with the remainder of the body being bright blue on the upper body and white ventrally. The pectoral fin is white with a black upper base, the pelvic and anal fins are white.

== Distribution and habitat ==
Caesio teres has a wide tropical Indo-West Pacific distribution. It is found from the East African coast between Somalia and South Africa east into the Pacific as far as the Line and Tuamotu Islands, north to southern Japan south to the Great Barrier Reef. It is absent from the Red Sea and the Persian Gulf. In Australian waters this species is found at Rowley Shoals in Western Australia, at the Ashmore Reef in the Timor Sea, and from the northern Great Barrier Reef to Escape Reef, Queensland. It is also found at Christmas Island and the Cocos (Keeling) Islands. This species is found on coral reefs at depths between 5 and 60 m (16 and 197 ft).

== Biology ==
Caesio teres feeds on zooplankton. It is diurnal, and lives in groups and forms schools with other species of fusiliers such as Caesio xanthonota.The adults migrate to defined areas in The vicinity of the reef where they spawn close to the surface over and in the openings of deep channels during ebbing tides, the timing being governed by lunar cycles. It is an oviparous species which lays large numbers of small, pelagic eggs.

== Fisheries ==
Caesio teres is targeted by fisheries in some parts of its distribution and frequently drive-in nets are used to catch it.
