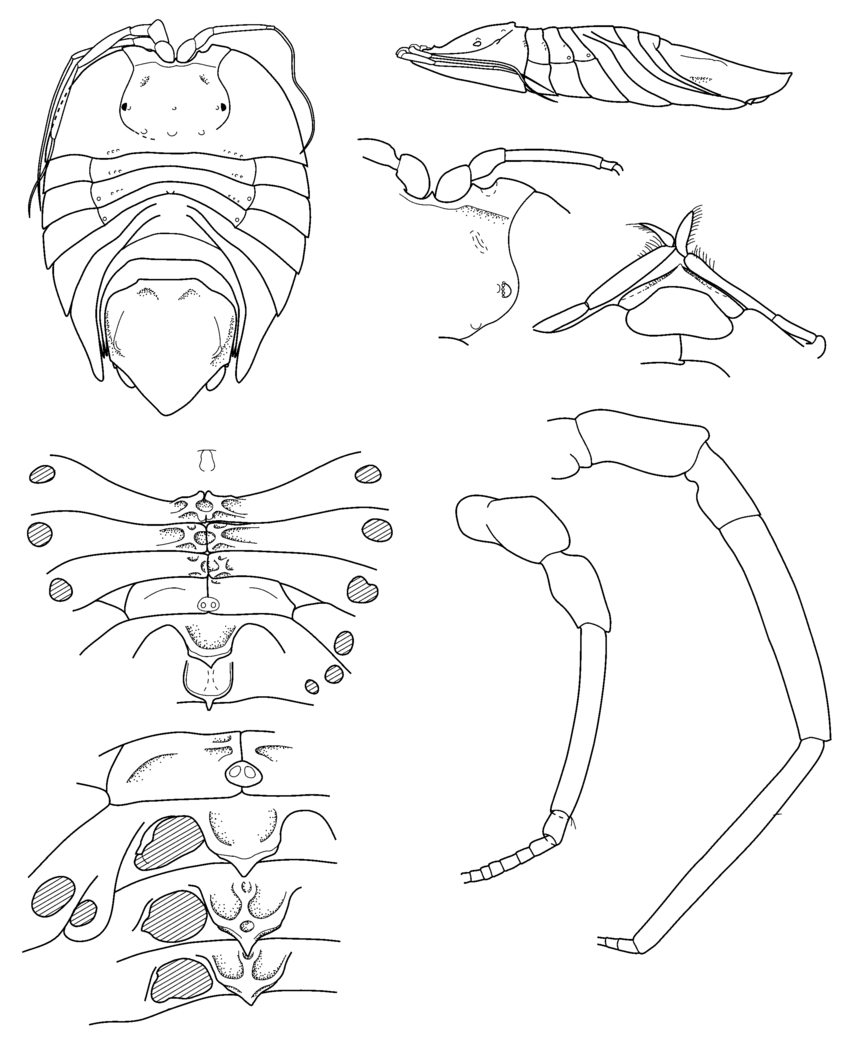

Scientific classification
- Kingdom: Animalia
- Phylum: Arthropoda
- Class: Malacostraca
- Order: Isopoda
- Family: Serolidae
- Genus: Myopiarolis
- Species: M. norfanz

Binomial name
- Myopiarolis norfanz Bruce, 2009

= Myopiarolis norfanz =

Species of crustaceans

Myopiarolis norfanz is a species of isopoda crustacean in the family Serolidae and was first described by Niel L. Bruce in 2009. It was named in honour of the NORFANZ Expedition.
