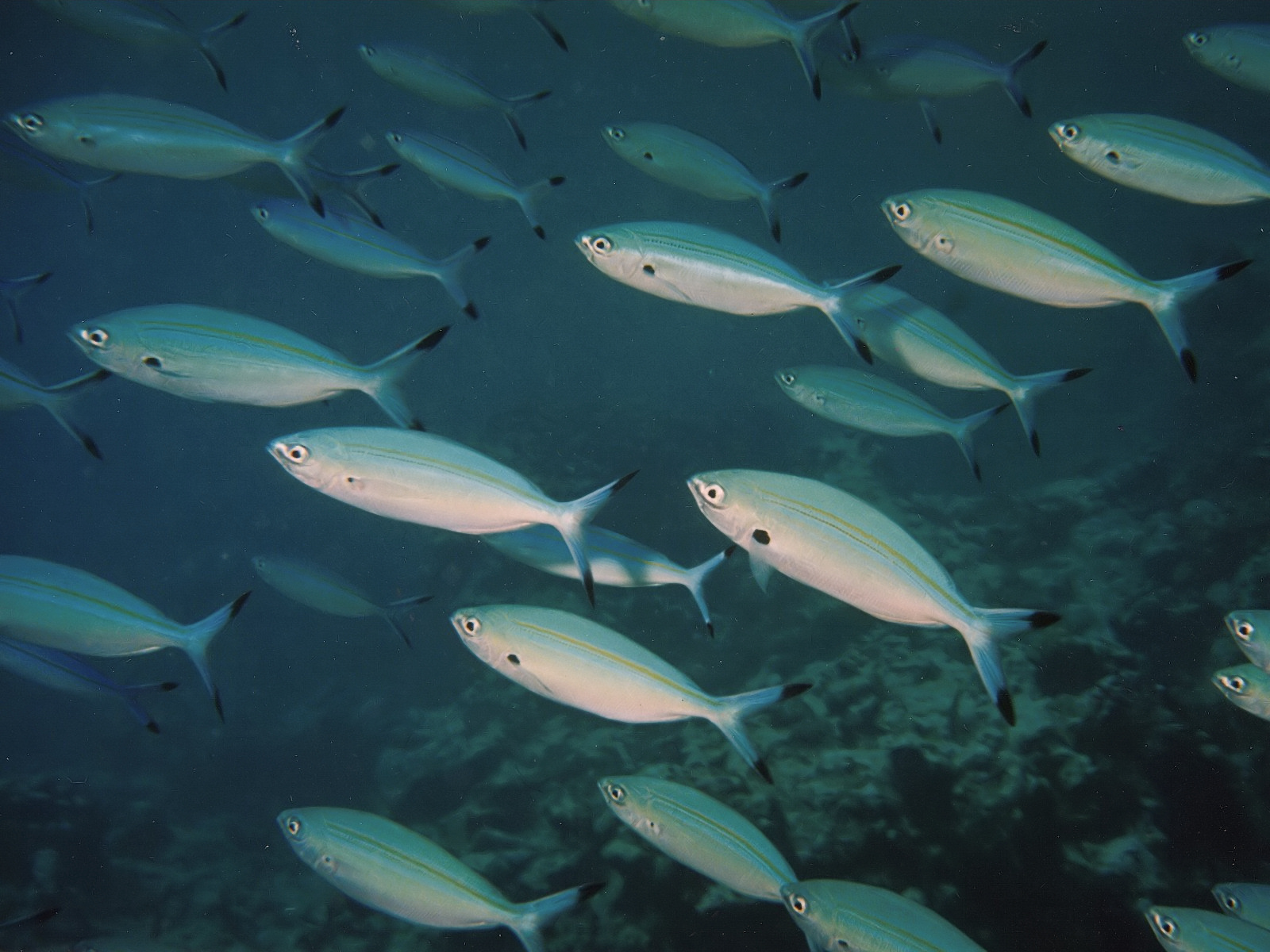

Conservation status
- Least Concern (IUCN 3.1)

Scientific classification
- Kingdom: Animalia
- Phylum: Chordata
- Class: Actinopterygii
- Order: Acanthuriformes
- Family: Lutjanidae
- Genus: Caesio
- Species: C. varilineata

Binomial name
- Caesio varilineata Carpenter, 1987

= Caesio varilineata =

Species of fish

Caesio varilineata, the variable-lined fusilier or thin-lined fusilier, is a species of pelagic marine ray-finned fish, a fusilier belonging to the family Caesionidae. It is found in the Indo-Pacific region.

== Taxonomy ==
Caesio varilineata was first formally described in 1987 by the American ichthyologist Kent E. Carpenter with the type locality given as the Persian Gulf. Carpenter placed it in the subgenus Caesio. The specific name is a combination of vari-, meaning "various" and lineata which means "lined", a reference to the variable number of horizontal, golden stripes on the flanks.

== Description ==
Caesio varilineata is a small to medium-sized fish which grows to about 40 cm (16 in) long. The eyes are large, the mouth is small and terminal and is protrusible, being able to be extended forward to swallow food. The body is fusiform or spindle-shaped. The caudal fin is deeply forked. The dorsal fin has 10 spines and 14–16 soft rays while the anal fin contains 3 spines and 11–13 soft rays. This species attains a maximum total length of 40 cm (16 in). The body colouration is silver green-blue with from 2 to 6 yellow longitudinal lines which intensity and width are variable. The external part of the lobes from the caudal fin are lined with black.

== Distribution & habitat ==
Caesio varilineata is only found in the Indian Ocean from western Indonesia to the eastern coast of Africa, Red Sea and Persian Gulf included. It lives in the open water close to reef and the external reefs. This species was recently reported from the Mediterranean Sea off Alexandria, Egypt, a likely entry via the Suez Canal. As there are no coral reefs in the Mediterranean these fusiliers have probably adapted to use rock reefs covered by Anthozoa.

== Biology ==
Caesio varilineata has a diet consisting of zooplankton which it feeds on in aggregations in the middle of the water column. It frequently joins mixed species schools with other species of fusiliers. It is an oviparous fish, laying a large number of small pelagic eggs.

== Fisheries ==
Caesio varilineata is moderately important to some coastal fisheries within its range and of minor importance in others. It is caught with gillnets, handlines and traps and is sold as fresh fish. It is a common item in fish markets in East Africa and in Sri Lanka, although only infrequently reported from markets in Oman, maybe as bycatch. In the Maldives and Laccadives, the juveniles are caught to be used as bait in the tuna fishery. This species is vulnerable to overexploitation and is regarded as being overfished in the Persian Gulf. The records from the Mediterranean came from fish markets in Alexandria.
