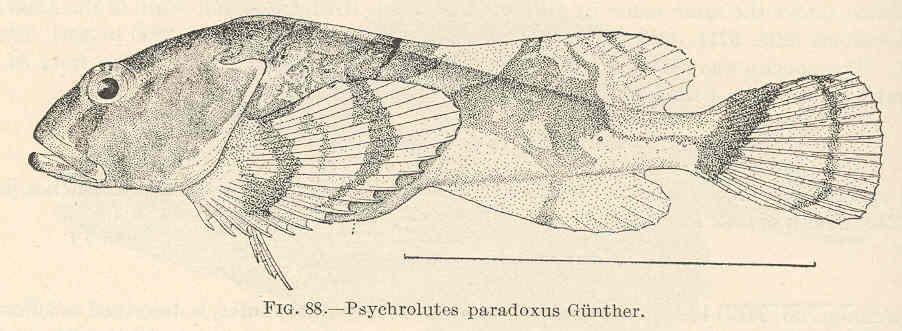

Scientific classification
- Kingdom: Animalia
- Phylum: Chordata
- Class: Actinopterygii
- Order: Perciformes
- Suborder: Cottoidei
- Family: Psychrolutidae
- Genus: Psychrolutes
- Species: P. paradoxus

Binomial name
- Psychrolutes paradoxus Günther, 1861

Synonyms
- Psychrolutes zebra Bean, 1890

= Tadpole sculpin =

Species of marine ray-finned fish

The tadpole sculpin (Psychrolutes paradoxus) is a species of marine ray-finned fish belonging to the family Psychrolutidae, the fatheads and toadfishes. This species is found in the North Pacific Ocean from the Sea of Okhotsk and the Sea of Japan north to the Bering Sea and east and south to the southern Puget Sound in Washington. It is found at depths between 0 and 1,100 m (0 and 3,609 ft), mainly on soft bottoms although it has been reported from rocky substrates, and may be found along the shore. This species reaches a maximum published total length of 9 cm (3.5 in).
