= Mermaid Reef Marine Park =

Australian marine park in the Rowley Shoals north-west of Broome, Western Australia

- IUCN category II (national park)
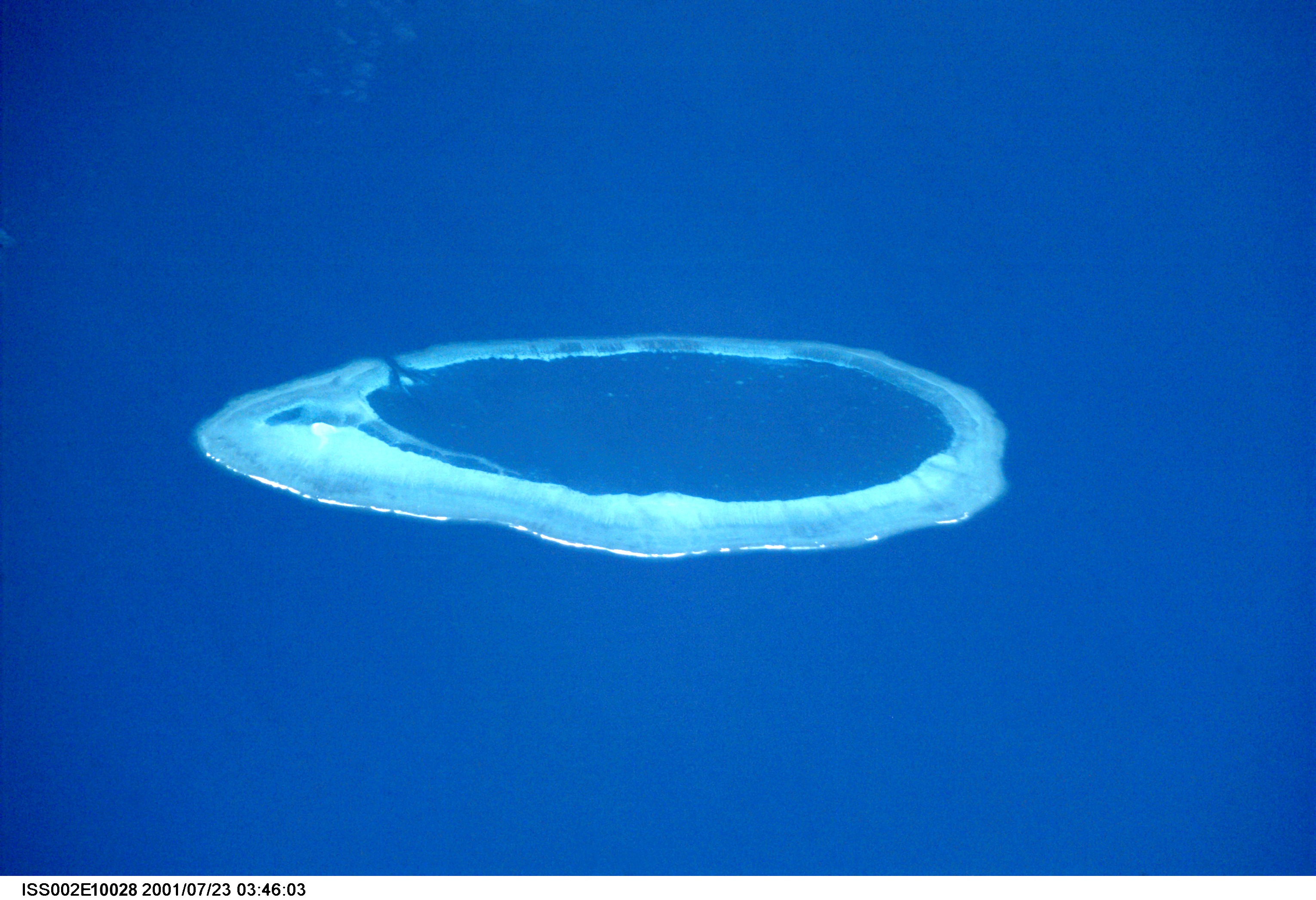
- Mermaid Reef within the park seen from the International Space Station on 23 July 2001.
- Map showing the Mermaid Reef Marine Park. The area is a National Park Zone ('no take' zone).
- Location: Australia
- Coordinates: 17.0917°S 119.6250°E
- Area: 540 km^{2} (210 sq mi)
- Established: 10 April 1991
- Operator: Parks Australia
- Website: parksaustralia.gov.au/marine/parks/north-west

The Mermaid Reef Marine Park (previously known as the Mermaid Reef Marine National Nature Reserve) is an Australian marine park in the Rowley Shoals, located approximately 280 kilometres (170 mi) north-west of Broome, Western Australia. The marine park covers an area of 540 km^{2} (210 sq mi) and is assigned IUCN category II. It is one of 13 parks managed under the North-west Marine Parks Network, and lies adjacent to the Argo-Rowley Terrace Marine Park

== Conservation values ==
=== Species and habitat ===
- Important areas for sharks including the grey reef shark, the whitetip reef shark and the silvertip whaler.
- Important foraging area for marine turtles.
- Important area for toothed whales, dolphins, tuna and billfish.
- Important resting and feeding sites for migratory seabirds
- The reserve, along with the adjacent Rowley Shoals Marine Park, provides the best geological example of shelf atolls in Australia

=== Ecology and bioregion ===
- Mermaid Reef has national and international significance due to its pristine character, coral formations, geomorphic features and diverse marine life. It is a key area for over 200 species of hard corals and 12 classes of soft corals with coral formations in pristine condition.
- Examples of the seafloor habitats and communities of the Northwest Transition provincial bioregion.

== History ==
The Marine Park was originally proclaimed on 10 April 1991 as the Mermaid Reef Marine National Nature Reserve. It was proclaimed as a Commonwealth Marine Reserve in 2013 and later renamed Mermaid Reef Marine Park on 9 October 2017.

== Summary of protection zones ==
The Mermaid Reef Marine park has been assigned IUCN protected area category II and is wholly zoned as a National Park.

The following table is a summary of the zoning rules within the Mermaid Reef Marine Park:

Zone	IUCN	Activities permitted						Total area (km^{2})
Zone	IUCN	Vessel transiting	Recreational fishing	Commercial fishing	Commercial aquaculture	Commercial tourism	Mining	Total area (km^{2})
National Park	II	Yes	No	No	No	excludes fishing, with approval	No	540
External link: Zoning and rules for the North-west Marine Parks Network

== See also ==
- Protected areas managed by the Australian government
