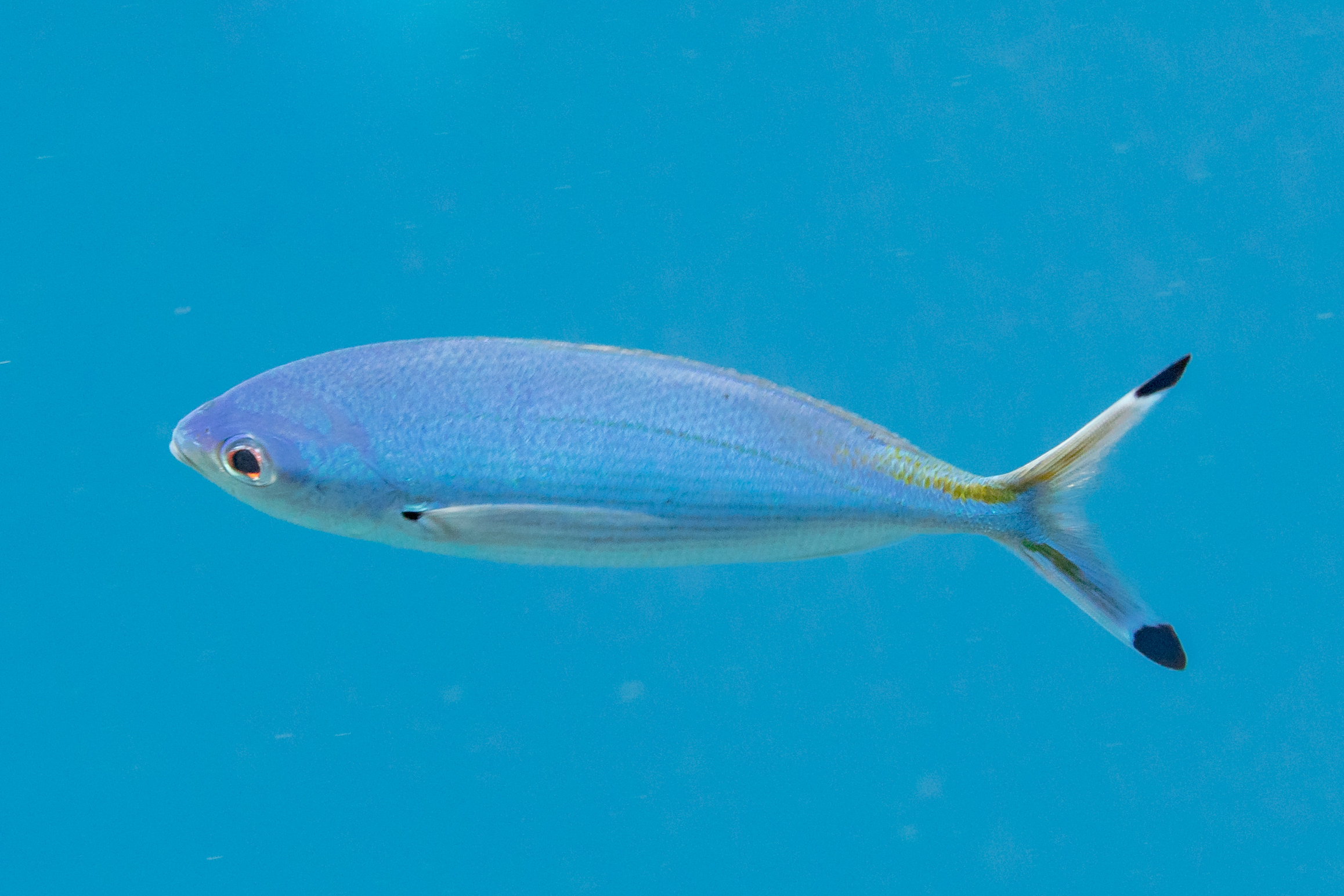
- Caesio suevica from the Red Sea

Scientific classification
- Kingdom: Animalia
- Phylum: Chordata
- Class: Actinopterygii
- Order: Acanthuriformes
- Family: Lutjanidae
- Subfamily: Lutjaninae
- Genus: Caesio; Lacépède, 1801

Type species
- Caesio caerulaureus Lacépède, 1801

Species
- See text

Synonyms
- Flavicaesio Carpenter, 1987; Odontonectes Günther, 1859

= Caesio =

Genus of ray-finned fishes

Caesio is a genus of marine ray-finned fish, fusiliers belonging to the family Lutjanidae. They are native to the Indian Ocean and the western Pacific Ocean, although one species has invaded the eastern Mediterranean Sea through the Suez Canal by Lessepsian migration.

== Taxonomy ==
Caesio was created in 1801 by the French naturalist Bernard Germain de Lacépède when he described Caesio caerilaurea. In 1876, the Dutch ichthyologist Pieter Bleeker designated C. caerulaurea as the type species of the genus Caesio. The genus name, Caesio, means ”blue”.

== Species ==
Currently, nine species in this genus are recognized, organised into three subgenera according to some authorities:

- Subgenus Caesio
  - Caesio caerulaurea Lacépède, 1801 – blue and gold fusilier
  - Caesio striata Rüppell, 1830 – striated fusilier
  - Caesio varilineata K. E. Carpenter, 1987 – variable-lined fusilier
  - Caesio xanthalytos Holleman, Connell & K. E. Carpenter, 2013
- Subgenus Flavicaesio
  - Caesio suevica Klunzinger, 1884 – Suez fusilier
  - Caesio teres Seale, 1906 – yellow and blueback fusilier
  - Caesio xanthonota Bleeker, 1853 – yellowback fusilier
- Subgenus Odontonectes
  - Caesio cuning (Bloch, 1791) – redbelly yellowtail fusilier
  - Caesio lunaris G. Cuvier, 1830 – lunar fusilier

== Characteristics ==
Caesio fusiliers have a reasonably high, fusiform and elongate body which is moderately laterally compressed. They have a continuous dorsal fin which has 10 spines, all of which are connected by membranes and have 13-16 soft rays. The anal fin has 3 spines and 10-13 soft rays. Both these fins have scales. The pectoral fins have 17 -23 rays. They may be plain or have one or more horizontal stripes and there may be black markings on the tail, typically black spots on the tips of the lobes or black lines in the middle of lobes.

== Distribution and habitat ==
Caesio fusiliers are found in coastal areas of the Indian and Pacific Oceans, including the Red Sea. One species, C. varilineata has been recorded in the eastern Mediterranean, probably having reached there through the Suez Canal as a Lessepsian migrant. They are mainly found on coral reefs.

== Biology ==
Caesio fusiliers are sociable fishes which aggregate in schools, frequently forming mixed species schools with other fusilier species. These fish have a diet dominated by zooplankton from midwater while in their schools. They attain sexual maturity quickly and the females have high fecundity. They lay numerous small, pelagic eggs and spawning occurs throughout much of the year. Spawning aggregations form at periods determined by lunar cycles.

== Fisheries ==
Caesio fusiliers are of some importance to inshore fisheries. They are taken using drive-in nets, gili nets, traps, trawls, and handlines. The catch is sold as fresh fish or preserved as salted fish. The juveniles of some species are caught to be used as bait in tuna fisheries.
