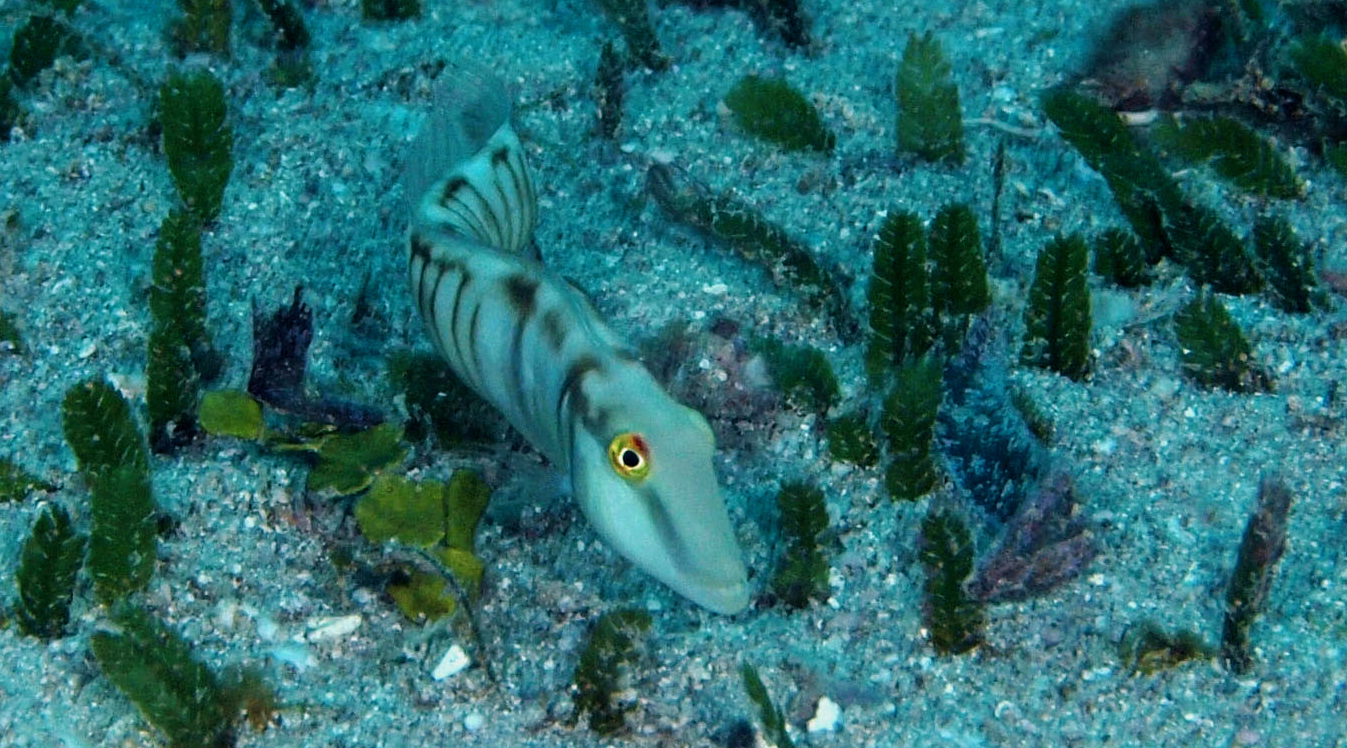

Conservation status
- Least Concern (IUCN 3.1)

Scientific classification
- Kingdom: Animalia
- Phylum: Chordata
- Class: Actinopterygii
- Order: Labriformes
- Family: Labridae
- Genus: Cymolutes
- Species: C. torquatus

Binomial name
- Cymolutes torquatus (Valenciennes, 1840)

Synonyms
- Xyrichthys torquatus Valenciennes, 1840

= Cymolutes torquatus =

Species of fish

Cymolutes torquatus, the finescale razorfish, razor wrasse or collared knifefish, is a species of marine ray-finned fish from the family Labridae, the wrasses. It is a solitary wrasse of sandy flats which has a wide Indo-Pacific distribution. It has no recorded human uses.

== Description ==
Cymolutes torquatus differs from Cymolutes praetextatus in having 12 instead of 13 rays in its dorsal fin and in the possession of dark brown markings on its head and body in not having a small black spot on the upper base of the caudal fin. It grows to a maximum of 20 centimetres (7.9 in) in standard length. The other meristic measurements for this species are that it has 9 spines in the dorsal fin as well as 9-12 soft rays while the anal fin has 2-3 spines and 9-12 soft rays.

== Distribution ==
Cymolutes torquatus is distributed from southwestern Madagascar and Rodrigues Island in the western Indian Ocean through that Ocean to Papua New Guinea and the Marquesas Islands, north to southern Japan, and south to Lord Howe Island, Lizard Island and Sydney Harbour in Australia.

== Habitat and biology ==
Cymolutes torquatus is found in sandy areas in lagoons, reef flats and tidal channels. The juveniles are frequently recorded in the vicinity of areas of sparse seagrass, algae and small rubble outcrops. This species can dive into the sand when it feels threatened. It can also be found in estuaries. It feeds on small benthic invertebrates.

== Species naming ==
Cymolutes torquatus was first formally described in 1840 as Xyrichthys torquatus by the French zoologist Achille Valenciennes with the type locality given as Suriname, which was an error as he meant the East Indies.
