= Psychrolutes marmoratus =

Scientific classification
- Kingdom: Animalia
- Phylum: Chordata
- Class: Actinopterygii
- Order: Perciformes
- Suborder: Cottoidei
- Family: Psychrolutidae
- Genus: Psychrolutes
- Species: P. marmoratus

Binomial name
- Psychrolutes marmoratus (Gill, 1889)

Synonyms
- Neophrynichthys marmoratus Gill, 1889; Besnardia gyrinops Lahille, 1913

Species of fish

Psychrolutes marmoratus is a species of marine ray-finned fish belonging to the family Psychrolutidae, the fatheads. This is a demersal fish which is found in the southwestern Atlantic and southeastern Pacific Oceans off Chilean and Argentinian Patagonia.
