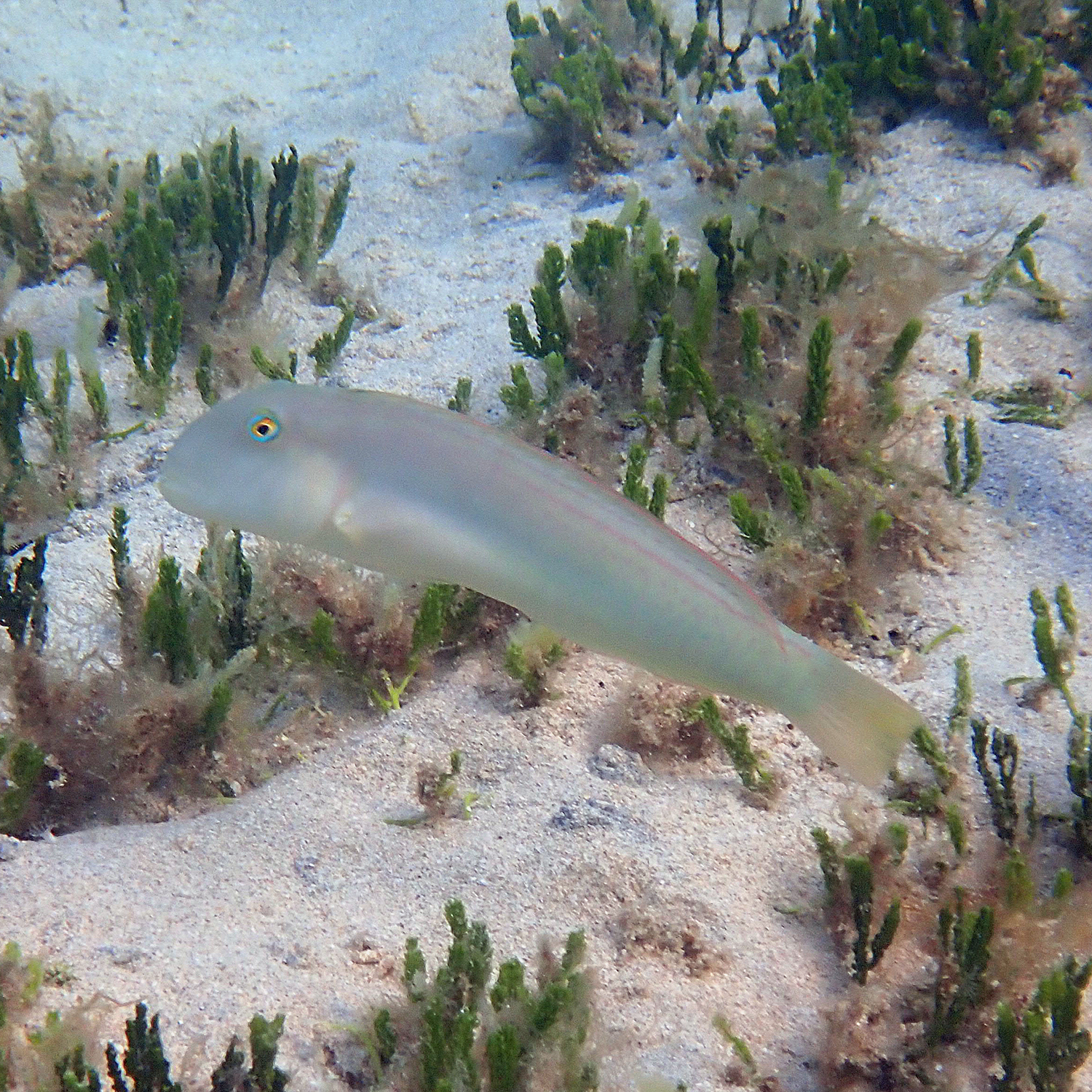
- Cymolutes praetextatus

Scientific classification
- Kingdom: Animalia
- Phylum: Chordata
- Class: Actinopterygii
- Order: Labriformes
- Family: Labridae
- Subfamily: Xyrichtyinae
- Genus: Cymolutes; Günther, 1861

Type species
- Julis praetextata Quoy & Gaimard, 1834

= Cymolutes =

Genus of fishes

Cymolutes is a genus of wrasses native to the Indian and Pacific Oceans.

== Species ==
The currently recognized species in this genus are:

Species	Common name	Image
Cymolutes lecluse (Quoy & Gaimard, 1824)	sharp-headed wrasse	
Cymolutes praetextatus (Quoy & Gaimard, 1834)	knife razorfish	
Cymolutes torquatus (Valenciennes, 1840)	finescale razorfish	
