= Psychrolutes macrocephalus =

Conservation status
- Least Concern (IUCN 3.1)

Scientific classification
- Kingdom: Animalia
- Phylum: Chordata
- Class: Actinopterygii
- Order: Perciformes
- Suborder: Cottoidei
- Family: Psychrolutidae
- Genus: Psychrolutes
- Species: P. macrocephalus

Binomial name
- Psychrolutes macrocephalus (Gilchrist, 1904)

Synonyms
- Cottunculus macrocephalus Gilchrist, 1904

Species of fish

Psychrolutes macrocephalus is a species of marine ray-finned fish belonging to the family Psychrolutidae, the fatheads. This is a bathydemersal fish which is found in the southeastern Atlantic from off the Northern and Western Cape of South Africa with reports from Namibia and Japan. It has been recorded at depths from 419 to 1,012 m (1,375 to 3,320 ft).
