= Argo-Rowley Terrace Marine Park =

Australian marine park north-west of Broome, Western Australia

- IUCN category VI (protected area with sustainable use of natural resources)
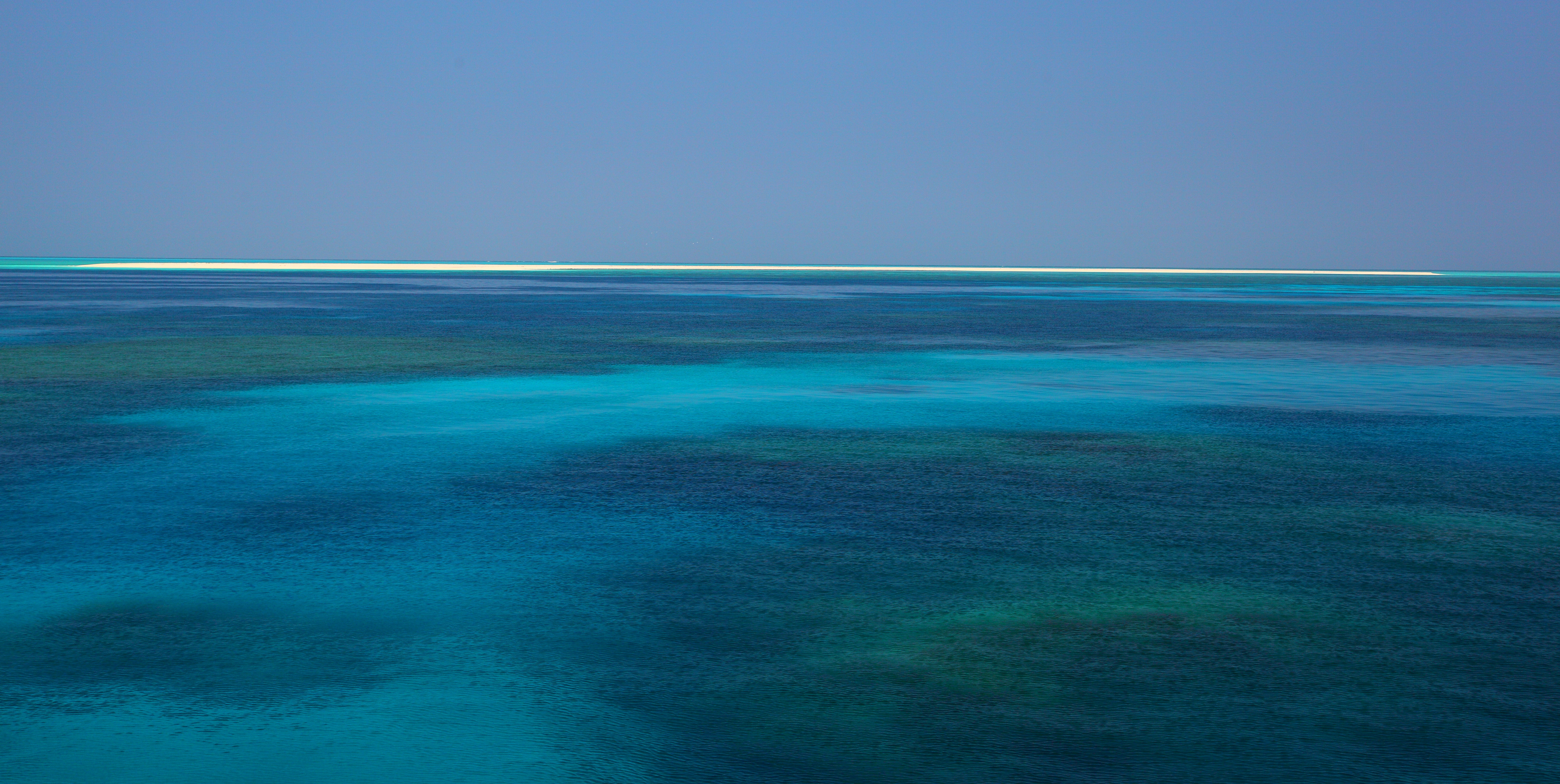
- Map showing the Argo-Rowley Terrace Marine Park. The shaded area is a National Park Zone ('no take' zone).
- Location: Australia
- Coordinates: 15.5086°S 118.3667°E
- Area: 146,003 km^{2} (56,372 sq mi)
- Established: 1 July 2018
- Operator: Parks Australia
- Website: parksaustralia.gov.au/marine/parks/north-west

The Argo-Rowley Terrace Marine Park (formerly known as the Argo-Rowley Terrace Commonwealth Marine Reserve) is an Australian marine park offshore of Western Australia. It encompasses the protected areas of the Rowley Shoals, about 260 km (160 mi) north-west of Broome. The marine park covers an area of 146,003 km^{2} (56,372 sq mi) and is assigned IUCN management category VI. It is the largest of the 13 parks managed under the North-west Marine Parks Network.

== Conservation values ==
=== Species and habitat ===
- Important foraging areas for migratory seabirds and the endangered loggerhead turtle.
- Important area for sharks, which are found in abundance around the Rowley Shoals relative to other areas in the region.
- The reserve provides protection for the communities and habitats of the deeper offshore waters of the region in depth ranges from 220 metres (720 ft) to over 5,000 metres (16,000 ft).

=== Bioregions and ecology ===
- The reserve provides protection for many seafloor features including aprons and fans, canyons, continental rise, knolls/abyssal hills and the terrace and continental slope.
- Examples of the communities and seafloor habitats of the Northwest Transition and Timor Province provincial bioregions.
- The reserve provides connectivity between the existing Mermaid Reef Marine Park and reefs of the Western Australian Rowley Shoals Marine Park and the deeper waters of the region.
- Canyons linking the Argo Abyssal Plain with the Scott Plateau (unique seafloor feature with enhanced productivity and feeding aggregations of species).
- Mermaid Reef and the Commonwealth waters surrounding Rowley Shoals (an area of high biodiversity with enhanced productivity and feeding and breeding aggregations).

== History ==
The marine park was proclaimed under the EPBC Act on 14 December 2013 and renamed Argo-Rowley Terrace Marine Park on 9 October 2017. The management plan and protection measures of the marine park came into effect for the first time on 1 July 2018.

== Summary of protection zones ==
The Argo-Rowley Terrace Marine Park has been assigned IUCN protected area category VI. However, within the marine park there are three protection zones; each zone has an IUCN category and related rules for managing activities to ensure the protection of marine habitats and species.

The following table summarizes the zoning rules within the Argo-Rowley Terrace Marine Park:

| Zone | IUCN | Activities permitted | | | | | | Total area (km^{2}) |
| Zone | IUCN | Vessel transiting | Recreational fishing | Commercial fishing | Commercial aquaculture | Commercial tourism | Mining | Total area (km^{2}) |
|---|---|---|---|---|---|---|---|---|
| National Park | II | Yes | No | No | No | excludes fishing, with approval | No | 36,050 |
| Multiple Use | VI | Yes | Yes | most, with approval | with approval | with approval | with approval | 108,812 |
| Special Purpose (Trawl) | VI | Yes | Yes | excluding longline, with approval | with approval | with approval | with approval | 1,141 |
External link: Zoning and rules for the North-west Marine Parks Network

== See also ==
- Protected areas managed by the Australian government
