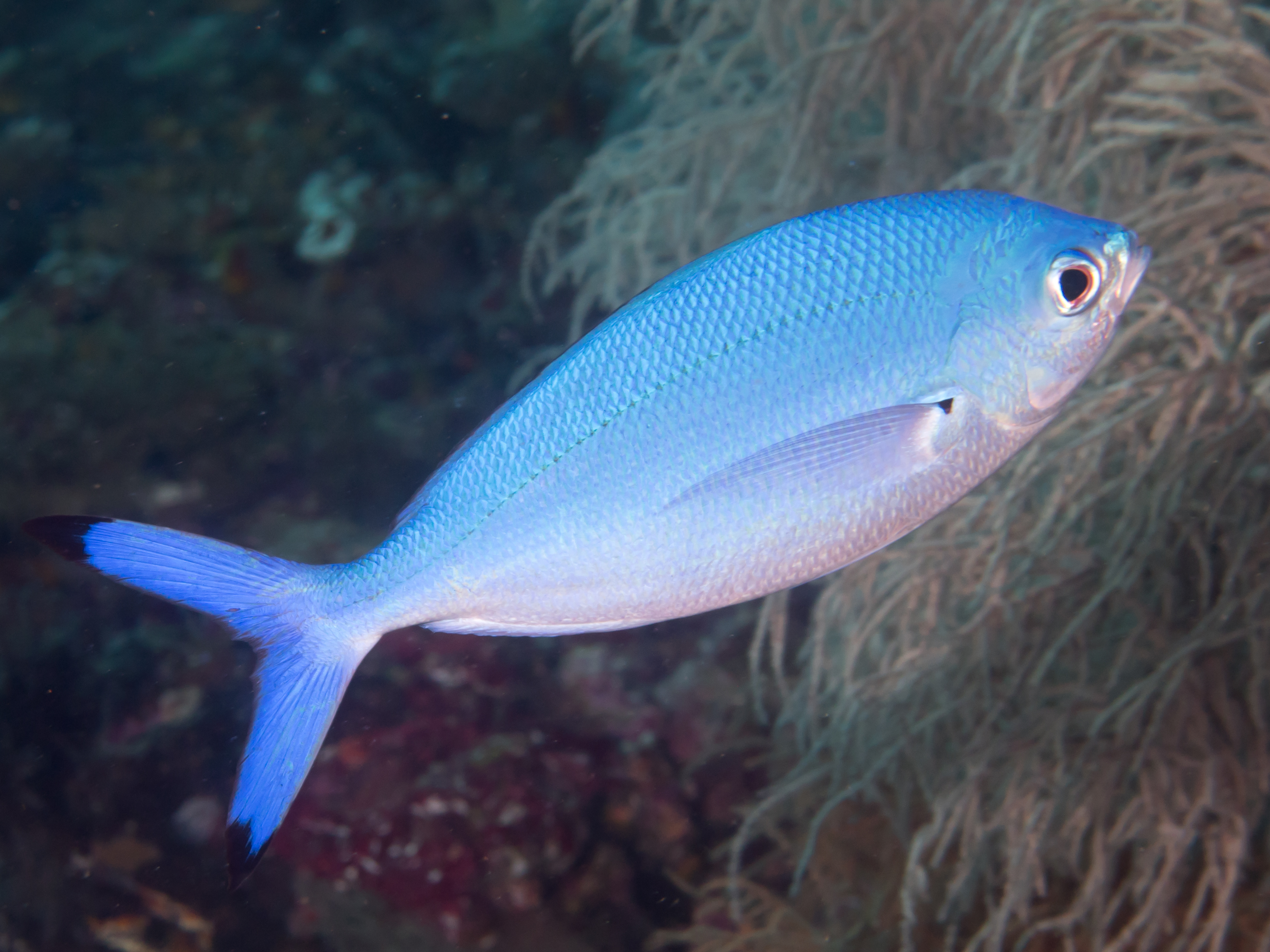

Conservation status
- Least Concern (IUCN 3.1)

Scientific classification
- Kingdom: Animalia
- Phylum: Chordata
- Class: Actinopterygii
- Order: Acanthuriformes
- Family: Lutjanidae
- Genus: Caesio
- Species: C. lunaris

Binomial name
- Caesio lunaris Cuvier, 1830

Synonyms
- Pterocaesio lunaris (Cuvier, 1830)

= Lunar fusilier =

Species of fish

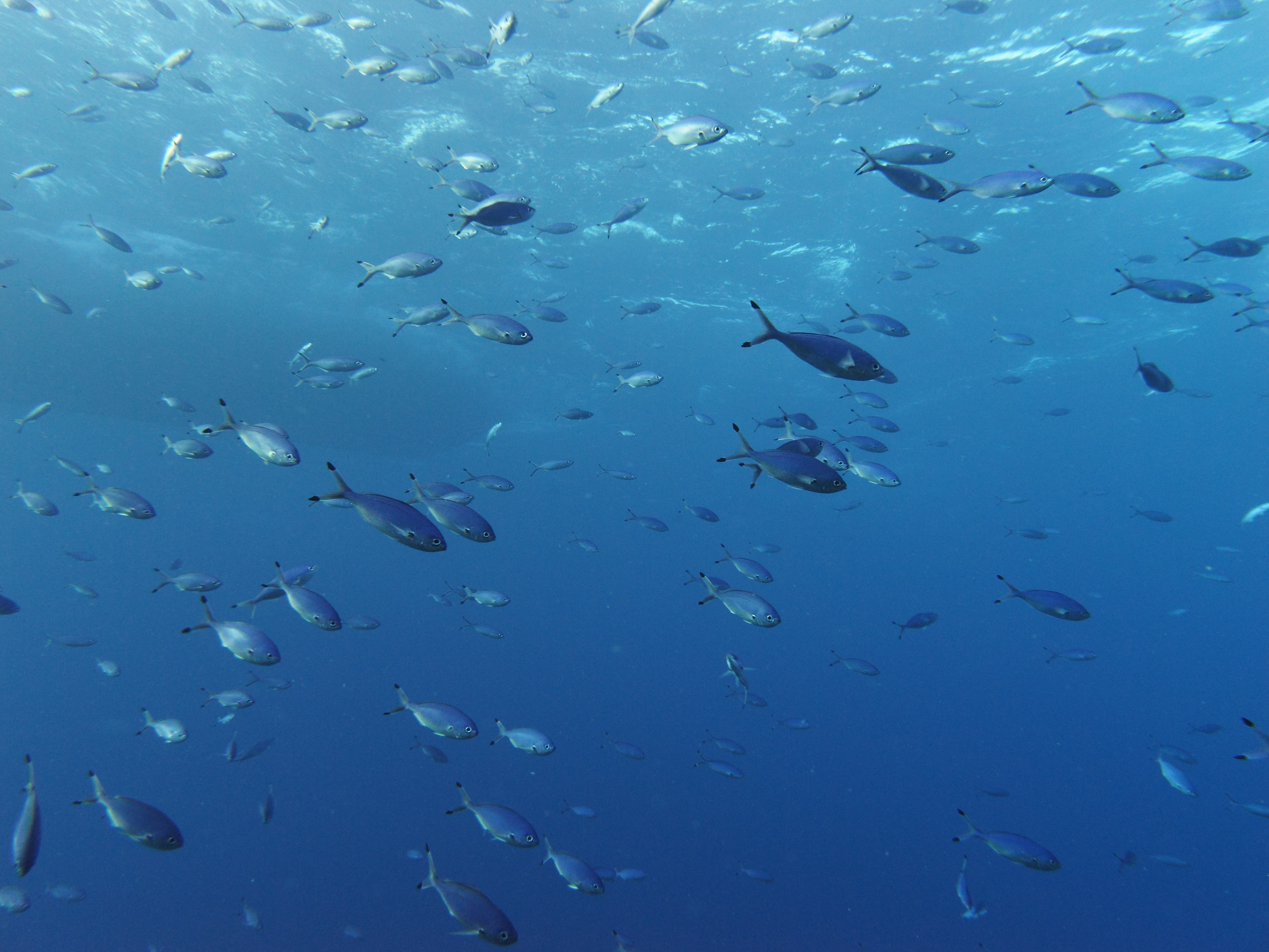
School of lunar fusilier at the Red Sea, Egypt

The lunar fusilier (Caesio lunaris), also known as the blue fusilier or moon fusilier, is a species of marine ray-finned fish, a fusilier belonging to the family Caesionidae. It is widespread throughout the tropical waters of the Indo-West Pacific area.

== Taxonomy ==
The lunar fusilier was first formally described in 1830 by the French zoologist Georges Cuvier with the type locality given as New Ireland. This species has been placed in the subgenus Odontonectes. The specific name lunaris means "of the moon", a name Cuvier attributed to Christian Gottfried Ehrenberg, the collector of the type), Cuvier being of the opinion that Ehrenberg gave it that name because of the row of scales on the neck which was in a crescent shape.

== Description ==
The lunar fusilier has a moderately deep, fusiform body which is laterally compressed. There are small teeth in the jaws, the vomer and the palatines. There are 10 spines in the dorsal fin and 13–15, usually 14. soft rays while the anal fin has 3 spines and 10, rarely 11, soft rays. The dorsal and anal fins have scales. The pectoral fins have 18–21, typically 19 or 20, rays. This species attains a maximum total length of 40 cm (16 in). The overall colour of the body is bluish, becoming a paler shade on the underside. The caudal fin lobes in adults are blue with a black tip to each lobe. The pectoral fins have a black axil and upper base. The rest of the pectoral fins, the pelvic fins and the anal fins are white to pale blue while the dorsal fin is bluish. Juveniles often have a yellow caudal fin and yellow markings on parts of the caudal peduncle.

== Distribution and habitat ==
The lunar fusilier is found throughout the Indo-West Pacific. It occurs along the eastern coast of Africa from the Red Sea to Sodwana Bay, KwaZulu-Natal, South Africa eastwards across the Indian Ocean, including the Persian Gulf and into the Pacific Ocean. In the Pacific its range extends east to the Marshall Islands and Fiji, north to southern Japan and south to off northwestern Australia and New Caledonia. It is found at depths down to 60 m (200 ft) in inshore waters, largely near coral reefs with a preference for the seaward slopes and in lagoons.

== Biology ==
Lunar fusiliers aggregate in large schools in midwater along the upper edges of steep slopes and in the vicinity of patch reefs. They frequently form mixed species schools with other fusiliers. They feed on zooplankton. The adults feed in deep clear waters some distance from the reef during the day, sheltering in the reef during the night, while the juveniles prefer to always stay close to the reef. The juveniles often associate with other juvenile fusiliers, mostly Caesio cuning. This is an oviparous species which lays large numbers of small, pelagic eggs.

== Fisheries ==
The lunar fusilier is targeted by fisheries in all areas in which it occurs. Fishermen use drive-in nets, gillnets, seine nets and fish traps to catch it. The catch is sold as fresh fish. This species is vulnerable to overfishing and has declined in some areas, but in many parts of its range it remains common.
