= Mr Blobby (fish) =

Famous blobfish

- Species: Psychrolutes microporos
- Died: June 2003
- Cause of death: Decompression
- Resting place: Australian Museum
- Known for: Subject of meme
- Awards: World's Ugliest Animal

Mr Blobby (officially designated AMS I.42771-001) was a specimen of Psychrolutes microporos, known for being the subject of an image macro meme reading "Go home evolution, you're drunk".

== Collection and photography ==
Mr Blobby was collected from the Norfolk Ridge during the NORFANZ Expedition in June 2003. Caught at a depth between 1013 and 1340 metres by the RV Tangaroa, it was 285mm long and had a parasitic copepod at the side of its mouth.

In its natural habitat, P. microporos is a tadpole-shaped fish with a tapered tail. The soft, swollen appearance of the specimen in the photograph is a result of barotrauma (cell rupturing due to differences in pressure), caused by rapid decompression as it was brought to the surface.

It was photographed in this state by Kerryn Parkinson, an ichthyologist at the Australian Museum. After taking a more standard scientific image of the specimen, Parkinson decided it was "comical, charismatic and grumpy", photographing it from the front as well.

== Media profile ==
In 2010, the photograph was featured in the Australian television show The Gruen Transfer, where advertising agencies were asked to design campaigns to "save the blobfish".

Mr Blobby's profile was raised again when it won the title of ugliest animal in the world in 2013, a competition run by the Ugly Animal Preservation Society with the goal of drawing attention to less charismatic species.

Mr Blobby appeared in the 2018 book You're Called What? by Kes Gray.

== Scientific significance ==
Though not a taxonomically significant specimen of Psychrolutidae, Mr Blobby has been described as indicative of the limited knowledge humans have of ocean fauna.

Mr Blobby is stored at the Australian Museum's Ichthyology Collection in 70% ethyl alcohol. This process has shrunk the specimen, and it now appears closer to its undersea form.
