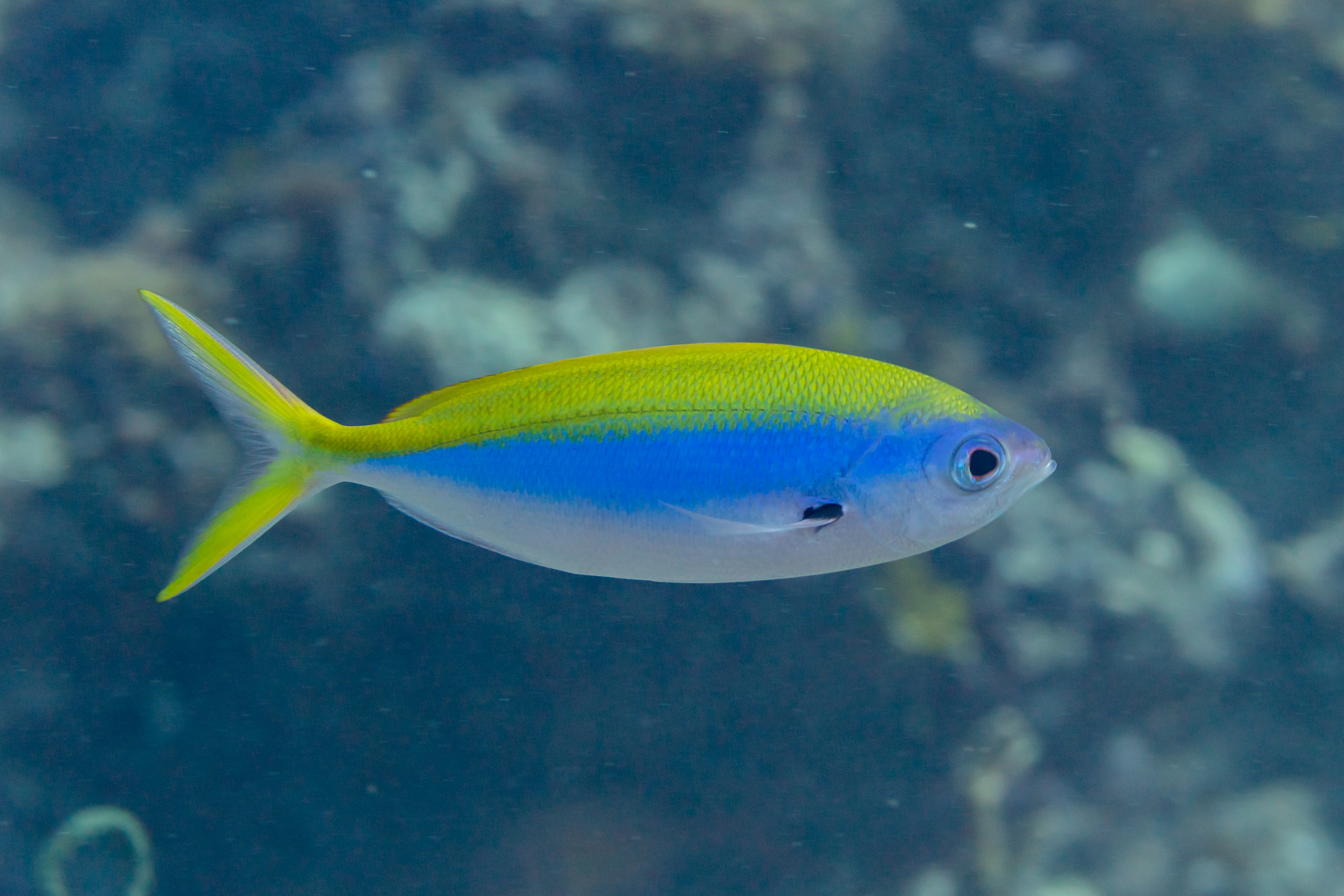

Conservation status
- Least Concern (IUCN 3.1)

Scientific classification
- Kingdom: Animalia
- Phylum: Chordata
- Class: Actinopterygii
- Division: Teleostei
- Order: Acanthuriformes
- Family: Lutjanidae
- Genus: Caesio
- Species: C. xanthonota

Binomial name
- Caesio xanthonota Bleeker, 1853

= Yellowback fusilier =

Species of fish

The yellowback fusilier (Caesio xanthonota) is a pelagic marine ray-finned fish, a fusilier belonging to the family Caesionidae. It is native to the tropical Indo-Pacific, being found in shallow water from the East African coast to Indonesia.

== Taxonomy ==
The yellowback fusilier was first formally described in 1853 by the Dutch ichthyologist Pieter Bleeker with the type locality given as Batavia on Java. This species has been placed in the subgenus Flavicaesio. The specific name xanthonota is a compunction of xantho meaning "yellow" and nota meaning "back", a reference to the yellow upperparts of this species.

== Description ==
The yellowback fusilier is a small to medium-sized fish which grows to about 40 cm (16 in) long. The mouth is small and terminal and is protrusible, being able to be extended forward to swallow food. The body is fusiform or spindle-shaped. The dorsal fin has 10 spines and 14–15 soft rays. The anal fin has three spines and 11 or 12 soft rays. The caudal fin is deeply forked.

The body coloration is greyish blue with a bright yellow zone on the back. The yellow area goes from the forehead, between the eyes, to the tail, and includes the dorsal fin and the caudal fin. This area corresponds more or less to the upper third of the body. The belly is plain white.

== Distribution and habitat ==
Caesio xanthonota is widely distributed throughout the tropical waters of the Indian Ocean, the Red Sea and Persian Gulf excluded, to Indonesia in the western Pacific Ocean. It lives in mid-water in deep lagoons and close to external reefs from the surfaceto 50 m deep.

== Diet ==
It feeds on zooplankton, so it is a planktivore.

== Behaviour ==
The yellowback fusilier is diurnal, and lives in groups and forms schools with other caesionids such as Caesio teres.
