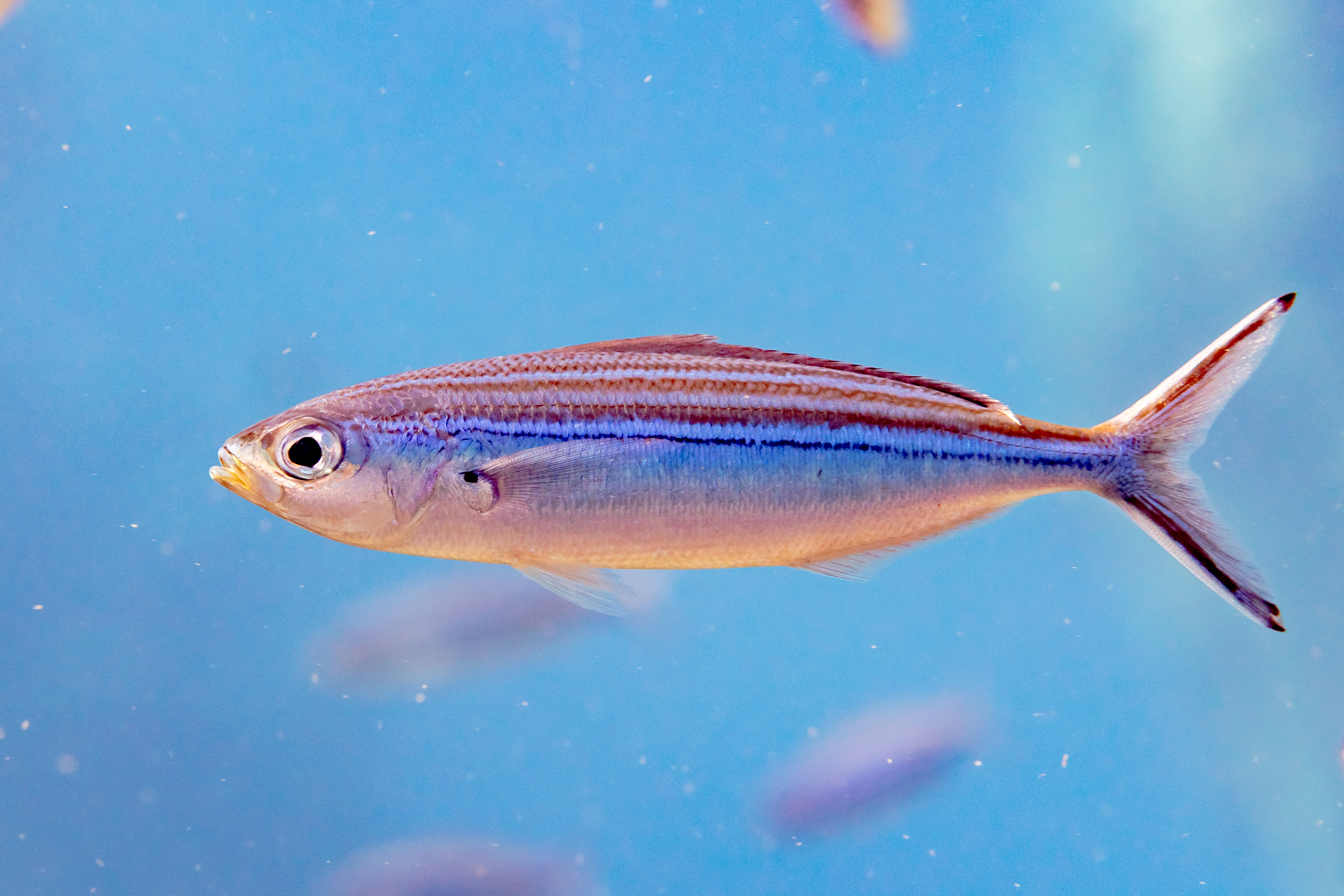
- Aggregation of Caesio suevica

Conservation status
- Least Concern (IUCN 3.1)

Scientific classification
- Kingdom: Animalia
- Phylum: Chordata
- Class: Actinopterygii
- Order: Acanthuriformes
- Family: Lutjanidae
- Genus: Caesio
- Species: C. suevica

Binomial name
- Caesio suevica Klunzinger, 1884

= Caesio suevica =

Species of fish

Caesio suevica, the Suez fusilier, is a species of marine ray-finned fish, a fusilier belonging to the family Caesionidae. It is endemic to the Red Sea.

== Taxonomy ==
Caesio suevica was first formally described in 1884 by the German zoologist Carl Benjamin Klunzinger with the type locality given as El Qoseir on the Red Sea coast of Egypt. In his 1987 review of the genus Caesio, Kent E. Carpenter placed this species in the subgenus Flavicaesio. The specific name means "belonging to Suez", the Gulf of Suez being just to the north of the type locality.

== Description ==
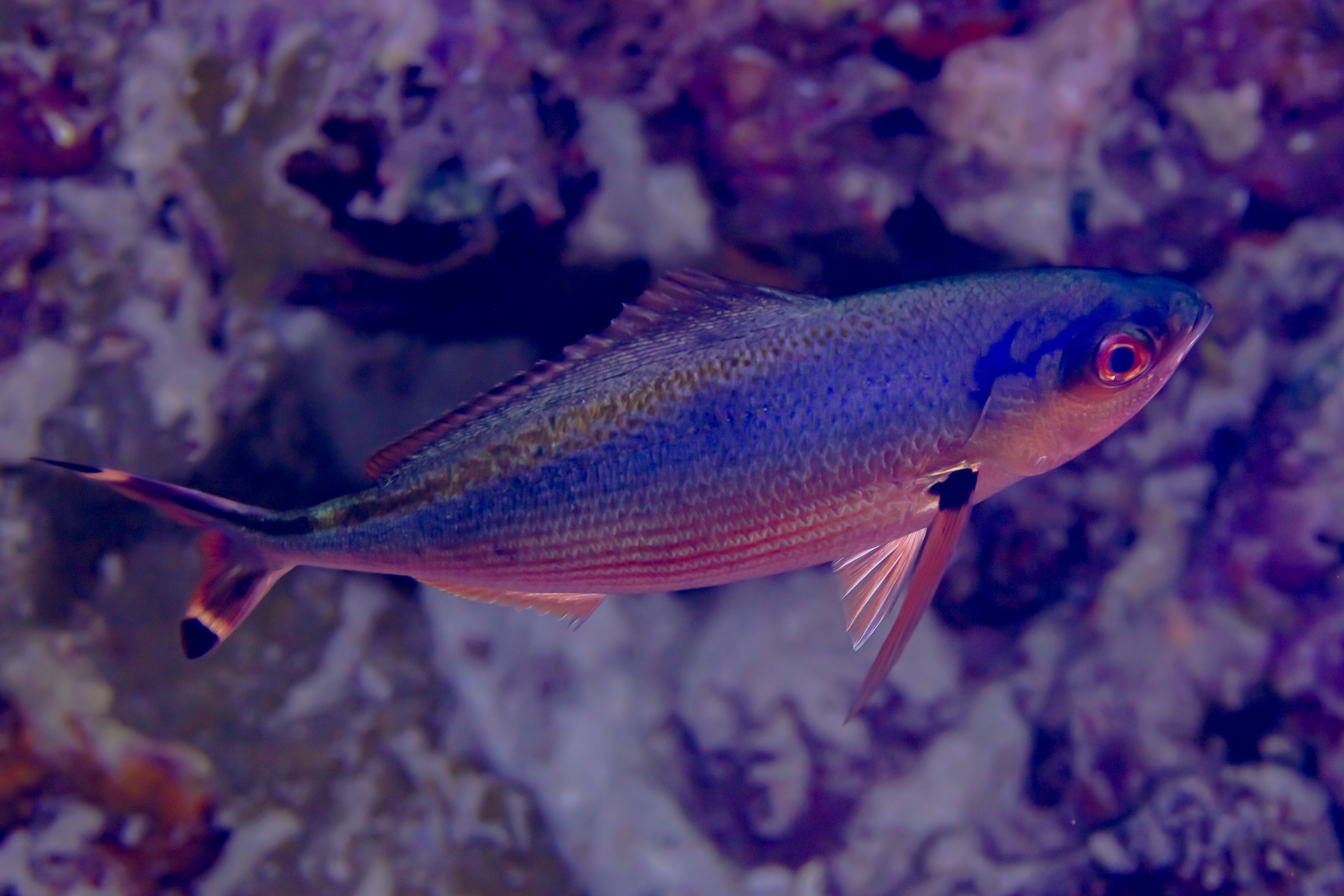
Suez fusilier with different coloration

Caesio suevica has a moderately slender, fusiform and laterally compressed body. The jaws, vomer and palatines have small conical teeth. The dorsal fin has 10 spines and 14-15 soft rays while the anal fin has 3 spines and 12 soft rays. This species can reach a maximum total length of 35 cm (14 in). These fishes are light silver blue, with fine gray stripes. The back shows a yellow line starting at the base of the dorsal fin. Ventrally they are paler. The tip of each caudal-fin lobe has a black blotch bordered by a white band.

== Distribution and habitat ==
Caesio suevica is endemic to the Red Sea records from elsewhere in the Indian Ocean are probably misidentifications. The Suez fusilier inhabits coastal areas, especially on coral reefs, at a depth from 2 to 25 m.

== Biology ==
Caesio suevica form large midwater aggregations. They are oviparous. Females lay many, small pelagic eggs. They mainly feed on zooplankton, mostly ctenophores and scyphozoans.

== Fisheries ==
Caesio suevica is sometimes fished for using handlines and gill nets. It is not a frequent target species for fisheries although, in Jordan, it is a commercially important.

== Bibliography ==
- Carpenter, K.E. (1987) Revision of the Indo-Pacific fish family Caesionidae (Lutjanoidea), with descriptions of five new species., Indo-Pacific Fishes (15):56 p.
