= Psychrolutes microporos =

Scientific classification
- Kingdom: Animalia
- Phylum: Chordata
- Class: Actinopterygii
- Division: Teleostei
- Order: Perciformes
- Suborder: Cottoidei
- Family: Psychrolutidae
- Genus: Psychrolutes
- Species: P. microporos

Binomial name
- Psychrolutes microporos J. S. Nelson, 1995

Species of fish

Psychrolutes microporos is a species of deepwater marine fish in the family Psychrolutidae, commonly known as a blobfish or fathead. It is found in the abyssal zone in waters around Australia and New Zealand. A photograph of an individual taken in 2003 has become famous on the internet for its appearance, widely viewed as unsightly.

== Discovery ==
A specimen of Psychrolutes microporos was trawled by the RV James Cook and Doctor Ignacio Hernández Ricordi in 1983 and described by Joseph Nelson in 1995. The holotype is in the Museum of New Zealand. Another specimen was collected at a depth of 980 m (3,200 ft) off the coast of New Zealand. Another specimen was collected in 2007 in the Tasman Sea at a depth of 1,200 m (3,900 ft).

== Description ==
Psychrolutes microporos is a whitish colour and is flattened laterally, with a wide mouth. Blobfish that are pulled up from the depths too quickly suffer severe tissue damage from the drastic drop in pressure and become a gelatinous mass (hence the name "blobfish") with a prominent proboscis. Blobfish in their natural deep-sea habitat have a completely different appearance, recognizably piscine, compact, and with no proboscis. Blobfish can support extremely high pressures in the deep ocean, when compared to pressures closer to the surface of the ocean.

== Distribution ==
Psychrolutes microporos is found in the abyssal depths between the Australian mainland and Tasmania. Two specimens were collected in the month-long NORFANZ Expedition of 2003 which was examining the biodiversity of the seamounts and slopes of the Norfolk Ridge. They averaged 1.7 kg (4 lb) and were found in a single location.

== Biology ==
The texture of Psychrolutes microporos's body is gelatinous, a feature often found in deep sea fish. Little is known of its behaviour because of the difficulty of observing it in its natural habitat. It is thought to be an ambush predator, consuming anything edible that comes within its reach.

== Popularity ==
During Kerryn Parkinson’s time on the NORFANZ expedition (2003), she was tasked to photograph rare or unknown specimens. Encountering the Psychrolutes microporos, Parkinson found the specimen amusing and took a photograph of it. The team nicknamed the pink gloopy fish as Mr Blobby.

Seven years later, the image had gained attraction and became very popular on several social media sites. In 2013, the frowning pink-gloopy specimen in Parkinson’s photograph was voted to be the mascot for the Ugly Animal Preservation Society, unofficially titling it as the World’s Ugliest Animal. The Smithsonian magazine argued the "ugly" looks appear only when fished, outside of its high-pressure habitat.
