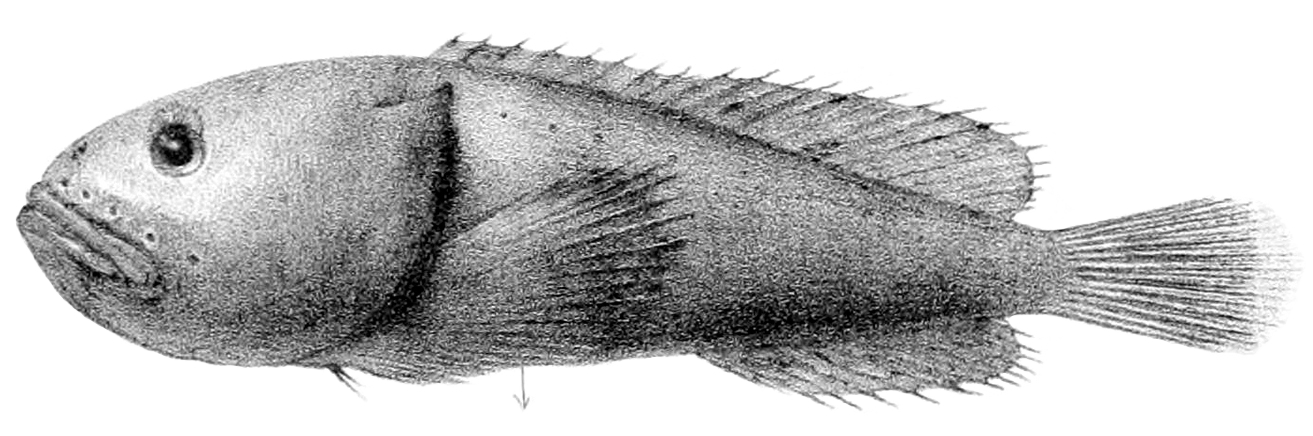

Conservation status
- Least Concern (IUCN 3.1)

Scientific classification
- Kingdom: Animalia
- Phylum: Chordata
- Class: Actinopterygii
- Order: Perciformes
- Suborder: Cottoidei
- Family: Psychrolutidae
- Genus: Psychrolutes
- Species: P. inermis

Binomial name
- Psychrolutes inermis (Vaillant, 1888)

Synonyms
- Cottunculus inermis Vaillant, 1888

= Psychrolutes inermis =

Species of fish

Psychrolutes inermis is a species of marine ray-finned fish belonging to the family Psychrolutidae, the fatheads. This is a bathydemersal fish which is found in the eastern Atlantic from Mauritania south to the southwestern Indian Ocean from South Africa and Mozambique. It has been recorded at depths from 550 to 1,550 m (1,800 to 5,090 ft).
