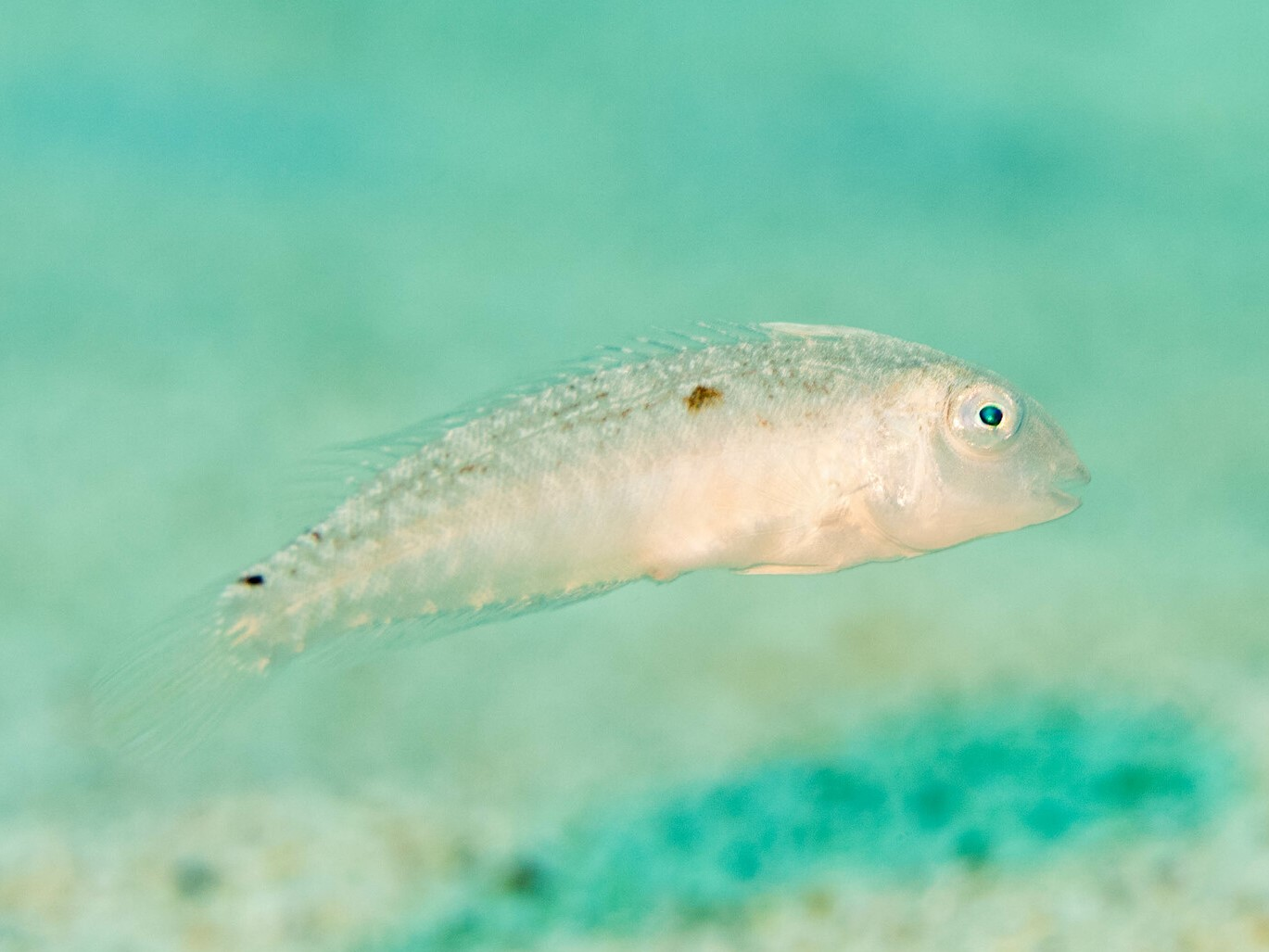
- Juvenile

Conservation status
- Least Concern (IUCN 3.1)

Scientific classification
- Kingdom: Animalia
- Phylum: Chordata
- Class: Actinopterygii
- Order: Labriformes
- Family: Labridae
- Genus: Cymolutes
- Species: C. lecluse

Binomial name
- Cymolutes lecluse (Quoy & Gaimard, 1824)

Synonyms
- Xyrichthys lecluse Quoy & Gaimard, 1824

= Cymolutes lecluse =

Species of fish

Cymolutes lecluse, the sharp-headed wrasse or Hawaiian knifefish, is a species of marine ray-finned fish from the family Labridae, the wrasses. It is endemic to the Hawaiian Islands where it is found in lagoons over sandy substrates and is piscivorous. It is found at depths of between 5–119 metres (16–390 ft).
