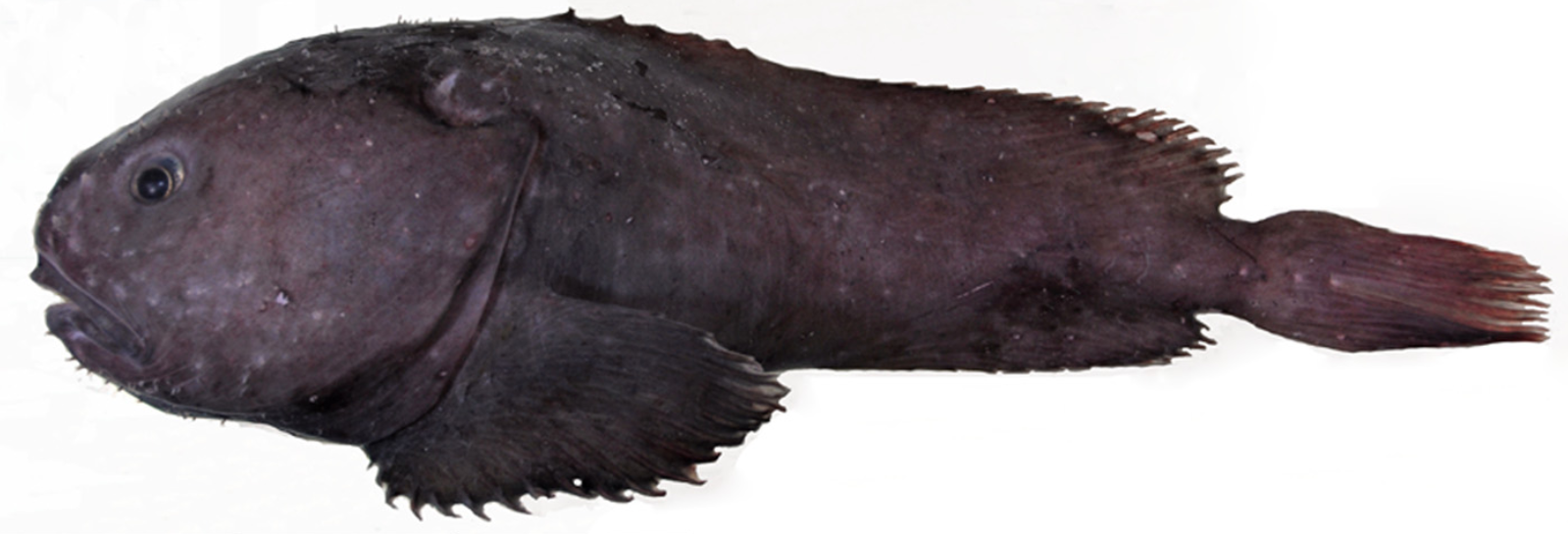

Scientific classification
- Kingdom: Animalia
- Phylum: Chordata
- Class: Actinopterygii
- Order: Perciformes
- Suborder: Cottoidei
- Family: Psychrolutidae
- Genus: Psychrolutes
- Species: P. sio

Binomial name
- Psychrolutes sio J. S. Nelson, 1980

= Psychrolutes sio =

Species of fish

Psychrolutes sio is a species of marine ray-finned fish belonging to the family Psychrolutidae, the fatheads. This is a demersal fish which is found in the eastern Pacific Oceans off Chile and Peru.
