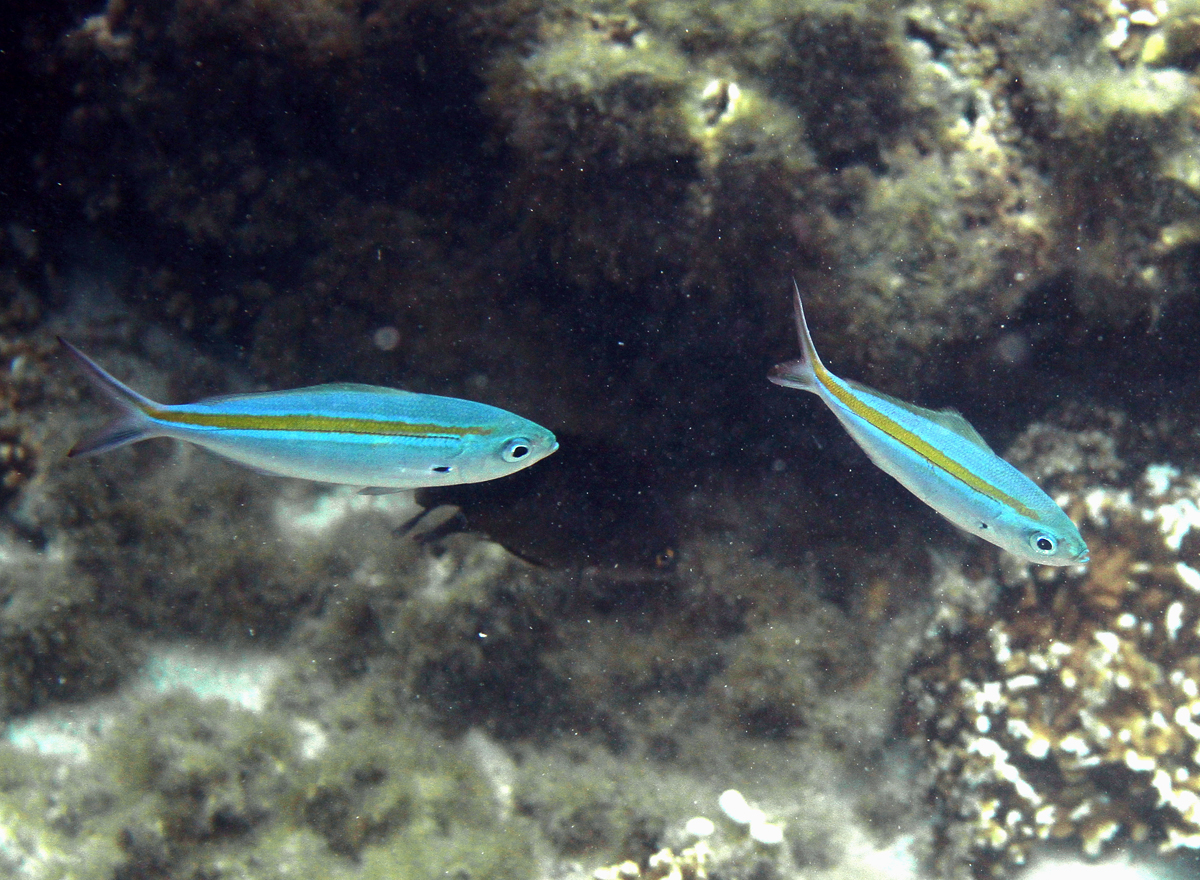

Conservation status
- Least Concern (IUCN 3.1)

Scientific classification
- Kingdom: Animalia
- Phylum: Chordata
- Class: Actinopterygii
- Division: Teleostei
- Order: Acanthuriformes
- Family: Lutjanidae
- Genus: Caesio
- Species: C. caerulaurea

Binomial name
- Caesio caerulaurea Lacépède, 1801

Synonyms
- Smaris mauritianus Quoy & Gaimard, 1824; Caesio maculatus Cuvier, 1830; Caesio azuraureus Rüppell, 1830; Caesio nori Montrouzier, 1857

= Caesio caerulaurea =

Species of fish

Caesio caerulaurea, the blue and gold fusilier (not to be confused with Caesio teres), blue fusilier, gold-band fusilier or scissor-tailed fusilier, is a species of marine fish in the family Caesionidae. It is widespread throughout the tropical waters of the Indo-Pacific area, including the Red Sea.

== Taxonomy ==
Caesio caerulaurea was first formally described in 1801 by the French naturalist Bernard Germain de Lacépède with the type locality given as Molucca in Indonesia. Lacépède used the name Caesio caerulaureus, although this was later corrected to C. caetulaurea as Caesio is feminine, creating a new genus. In 1876 the Dutch ichthyologist Pieter Bleeker designated C. caerulaurea as the type species of the genus Caesio. The specific name caerluaurea is a derived from caeruleaus meaning "sky blue" and aureus which means "golden", a reference to the blue back and yellow flank stripe Lacépède described.

== Description ==
Caesio caeruaurea has a quite deep, fusiform, elongated body which shows moderate lateral compression. There are small conical teeth in the jaws as well as on the vomer and the palatine. The dorsal fin has 10 spines and 14–16 soft rays while the anal fin contains 3 spines and 10–12 soft rays. The dorsal and anal fins have scales. This species attains a maximum total length of 35 cm (14 in), although 25 cm (9.8 in) is more typical. The overall colour of this fusilier is bluish fusilier changing to white on the underside. There is a yellow or golden stripe over the lateral line bordered on both sides by a thin white to pale blue stripe which continues as blackish streaks on both lobes of the forked caudal fin, creating the appearance of scissors.

== Distribution and habitat ==
Caesio caerulaurea has a wide distribution in the tropical waters of the Indo-Pacific. It is found along the eastern coast of Africa from the Red Sea as far south as South Africa then east along through the Indian Ocean, although it is absent from the Persian Gulf into the Pacific. In the Pacific Ocean their range extends east as far as French Polynesia, northwards to southern Japan and south as far as Vanuatu and New Caledonia. In Australia it is found from Shark Bay in Western Australia north to Cassini Island, the Ashmore Reef in the Timor Sea and from the northern Great Barrier Reef off, Queensland south to Sydney. It also occurs at Christmas Island and Lord Howe Island. It occurs at depths between 2 and 40 m (6 ft 7 in and 131 ft 3 in). This species occurs on coastal, lagoon and seaward reefs, typically where there is a healthy growth of corals.

== Biology ==
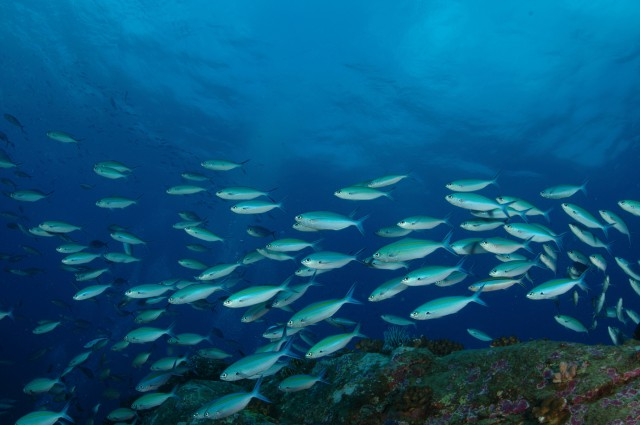
Caesio caerulaurea (Lacepède, 1801)

Caesio caerulaurea forms large schools in midwater where they feed on zooplankton. They attain sexual maturity quite early, have a high fecundity with numerous small pelagic eggs. Spawning takes place during most of the year, and occurs as mass spawning on lunar cycles.

=== Spawning behaviour ===
Caesio caerulaurea has a definite pattern of courtship with six distinct patterns. Firstly as the dusk approaches 1–2 males approach a female and start to nip and butt her abdomen, which is swollen. This takes place 60–90 minutes ahead of spawning. The fish then interrupt this behaviour and return to their shoals. Less than 60 minutes prior to actual spawning 2–6 males will compete to get their abdomen as close to the female's as they can. Once a male has excluded the other males the pair swim upwards in a spiral to the surface where the eggs and milt are released. This is followed by other "sneaker" males who release their own milt at the spot where the original pair spawned. Sometimes a pair can avoid being followed by "sneaker" males.

== Fisheries ==
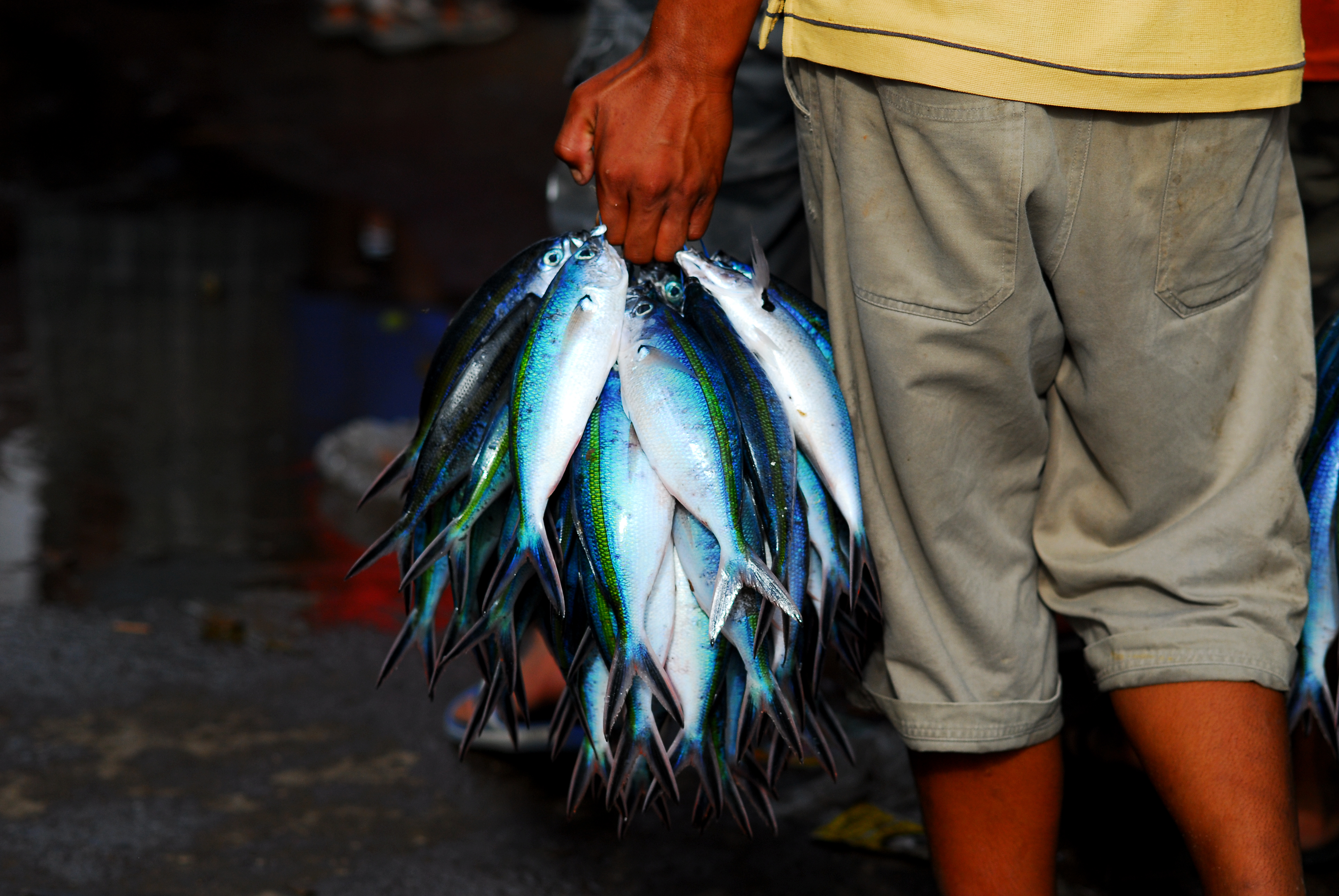
Port Moresby Fish Market

Caesio caerulaurea is an important quarry for coastal fisheries, and is frequently recorded in fish markets in Indonesia and the Philippines. They are caught using drive-in nets, gill nets, fish traps, trawls and handlines. The juveniles are used as tuna baitfish in some areas. It is normally caught as part of a multispecies catches of fusiliers. There is also illegal fishing of this species using blasts from explosives thrown in the sea.
