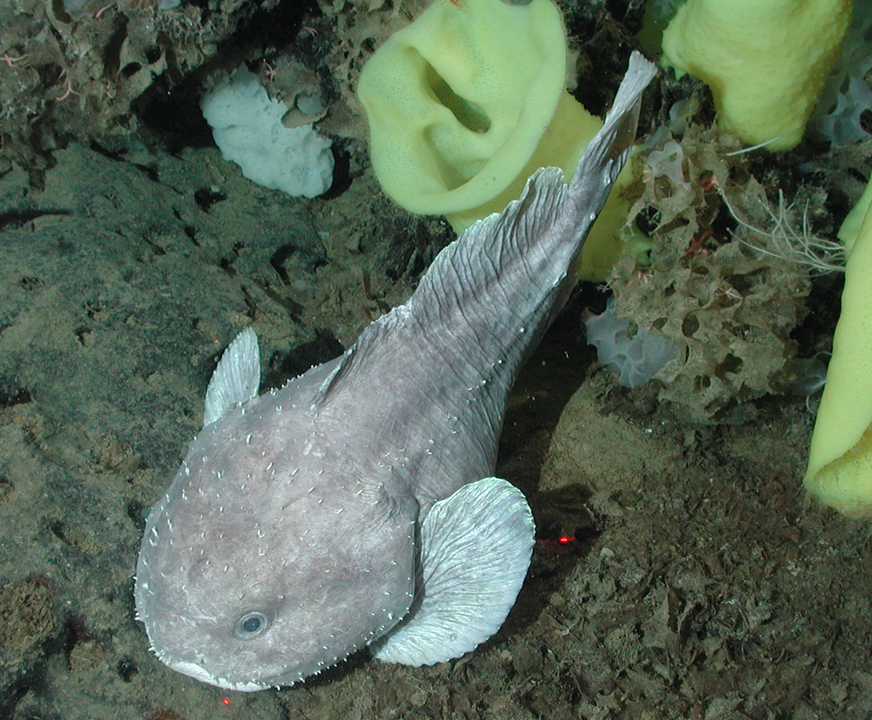

Scientific classification
- Kingdom: Animalia
- Phylum: Chordata
- Class: Actinopterygii
- Division: Teleostei
- Order: Perciformes
- Suborder: Cottoidei
- Family: Psychrolutidae
- Genus: Psychrolutes
- Species: P. phrictus

Binomial name
- Psychrolutes phrictus Stein & C. E. Bond, 1978

= Blob sculpin =

Species of fish

The blob fish (Psychrolutes phrictus) or blob sculpin is a species of deep-sea fish of the family Psychrolutidae. It feeds mainly on crustaceans, molluscs, and sea pens.

It lives off the continental shelves in very deep water (839–2800 m) in the North Pacific Ocean by the coasts of Japan, the Bering Sea, and California. When the female lays eggs the adult fish guard the nest.

== Description ==
Maximum length is 70 cm (28 in). The head is broad and flattened, the eyes are large and widely separated, and the mouth is curved with fleshy lips. There is no spine in front of the operculum (the bony flap that covers the gills), the branchiostegal membranes are fused to the isthmus (the fleshy projection separating the gill openings), and there are many small cirri (fleshy threads) scattered over the head and body. The operculum is poorly ossified and is covered by a gelatinous layer. Behind the head, the body tapers rapidly to the caudal peduncle and there is a gelatinous layer between the skin and the muscle. The dorsal fin has eight spines and nineteen to twenty soft rays, and the anal fin has no spines and twelve to fourteen soft rays. The pectoral fins are broad and in larger individuals, have fleshy pads near their tips. The upper parts of this fish are grey or black and the underparts pale, with some indistinct mottling. It has 8 spines.

== Distribution ==
The blob sculpin is native to the northeastern Pacific Ocean where it is found on or near the seabed at depths from 500 to 2,800 m (1,600 to 9,200 ft). The bottom water temperatures in the area averaged around 2.4 °C (36.3 °F). For most of the egg nests observed, adult fish were keeping close vigil nearby, frequently positioned right on top of or directly touching the eggs, usually within 3 meters of the nest.

=== Ecology ===
Aggregations of blob sculpins have been observed by using a remotely operated underwater vehicle. The fish were at depths between 1,300 and 3,000 m (4,300 and 9,800 ft) on the Gorda Escarpment off the coast of California. They spawn adhesive eggs onto limestone-like rocks in the deep sea, and are known to brood large pinkish eggs in nests, actually lying on the eggs or in contact with them in many instances. The collected eggs measured an impressive 40 mm in length. However, numerous eggs began hatching prematurely upon being sampled, with the emerging juvenile organisms still retaining remnants of the egg casing surrounding them. The eggs were free of sediment which makes it likely the adults were actively fanning them, the first known example of parental care in egg-laying deep sea fishes. Scattered around and among the sculpins were octopuses in the genus Graneledone, also brooding their eggs. About half the octopuses were within 5 metres of an adult or breeding sculpin. At one site, 84 sculpins and 64 nests were observed as well as numerous brooding octopuses; the researchers described it as a "reproductive hot spot".

The diet of this fish consists mainly of such invertebrates as sea pens, crustaceans and gastropod molluscs. Other items consumed include cephalopods, crinoids, sea cucumbers and fish. Some of the species of fish are pelagic but researchers think they must have been swimming close to the seabed when consumed because the morphology of the blob sculpin is typical of a bottom dwelling fish. It is the host of skin parasites such as the copepods Chondracanthus yanezi and Neobrachiella amphipacifica.

== In captivity ==
The blob sculpin is extremely rare in captivity, but since at least 2017 successful attempts to house the species in Japan have been made Aquamarine Fukushima.
