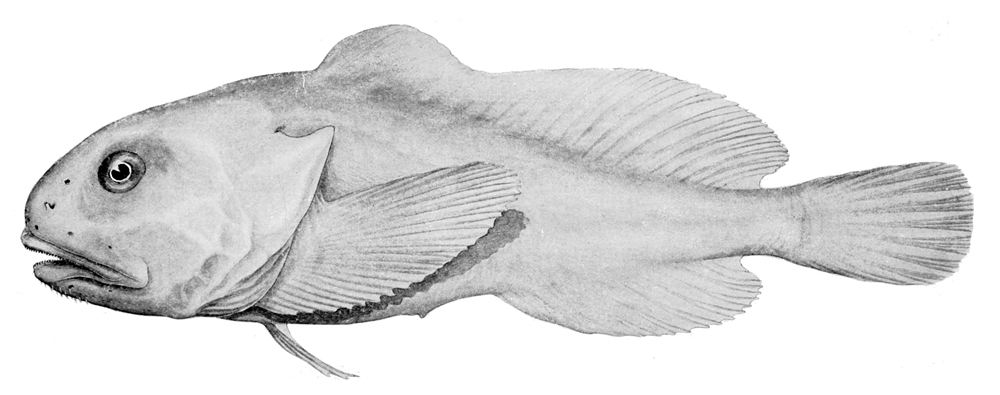
- An illustration of a blobfish by Allan Riverstone McCulloch

Scientific classification
- Kingdom: Animalia
- Phylum: Chordata
- Class: Actinopterygii
- Order: Perciformes
- Suborder: Cottoidei
- Family: Psychrolutidae
- Genus: Psychrolutes
- Species: P. marcidus

Binomial name
- Psychrolutes marcidus (McCulloch, 1926)

Synonyms
- Neophrynichthys marcidus McCulloch, 1926

= Psychrolutes marcidus =

Species of fish

Psychrolutes marcidus, the smooth-head blobfish, or simply the blobfish, is a deep-sea fish of the family Psychrolutidae. It inhabits the deep waters off the coasts of mainland Australia and Tasmania, as well as the waters of New Zealand.

Blobfish are typically shorter than 30 cm (12 in). They live at depths between 600 and 1,200 m (2,000 and 3,900 ft), where the pressure is 60 to 120 times greater than that at sea level, which would likely make gas bladders inefficient for maintaining buoyancy. Instead, the flesh of the blobfish is primarily a gelatinous mass with a density slightly less than that of water; this allows the fish to float above the sea floor without expending energy on swimming. The blobfish has a relative lack of muscle, but this is not a disadvantage, as its main food source is edible matter that floats in front of it, such as deep-ocean crustaceans.
