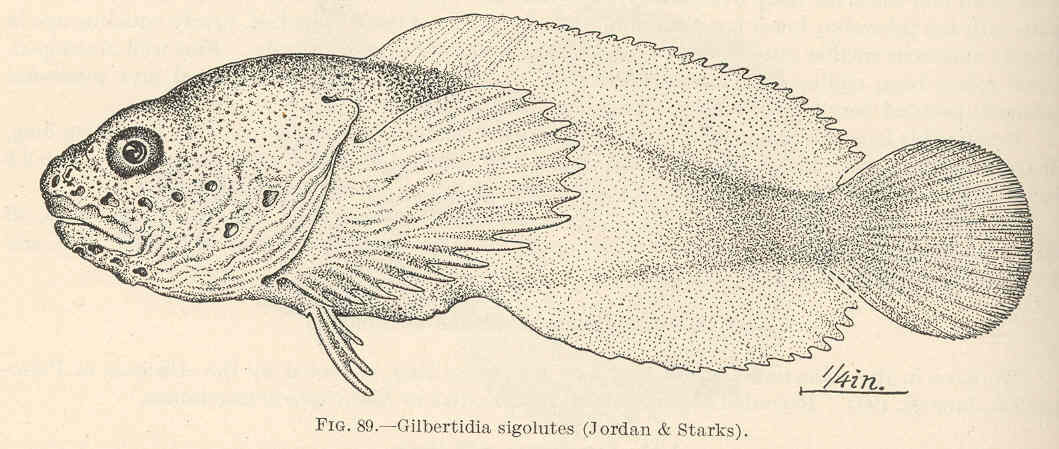

Scientific classification
- Kingdom: Animalia
- Phylum: Chordata
- Class: Actinopterygii
- Order: Perciformes
- Suborder: Cottoidei
- Family: Psychrolutidae
- Genus: Psychrolutes
- Species: P. sigalutes

Binomial name
- Psychrolutes sigalutes (Jordan & Starks, 1895)

Synonyms
- Gilbertina sigalutes Jordan & Starks, 1895; Gilbertidia sigalutes (Jordan & Starks, 1895)

= Soft sculpin =

Species of fish

The soft sculpin (Psychrolutes sigalutes) is a species of marine ray-finned fish belonging to the family Psychrolutidae, the fatheads and toadfishes. This species is found in the North Pacific Ocean from the Bering Sea to the southern Puget Sound in Washington. It is found at depths between 0 and 225 m (0 and 738 ft), mainly in rocky substrates and among sponges, it has also been reported from soft substrates. This species reaches a maximum published total length of 8.3 cm (3.3 in).
