= Psychrolutes occidentalis =

Western Australian Sculpin

Scientific classification
- Kingdom: Animalia
- Phylum: Chordata
- Class: Actinopterygii
- Order: Perciformes
- Suborder: Cottoidei
- Family: Psychrolutidae
- Genus: Psychrolutes
- Species: P. occidentalis

Binomial name
- Psychrolutes occidentalis R. Fricke, 1990

Species of fish

Psychrolutes occidentalis, also known as the Western Australian sculpin or western blobfish, is a species of deep-sea fish of the family Psychrolutidae. It is a bathydemersal fish found along the continental slope to the west of Australia.

== Distribution ==
Individuals have only been discovered in the Eastern Indian Ocean, around the Rowley Shoals off of northwestern Australia and well as Tasmania. They live in depths ranging from 350–700 meters deep. The discovery of psychrolutes occidentalis in this location was unusual as psychrolutes are not typically found in tropical waters.

== Biology ==
The species is found on the continental slope, and is a demersal fish, living near the bottom of the ocean. It grows to 11 cm (4.3 in) standard length.

The species has a soft reddish/brown body and head, with thin, loose skin covering all fins.
