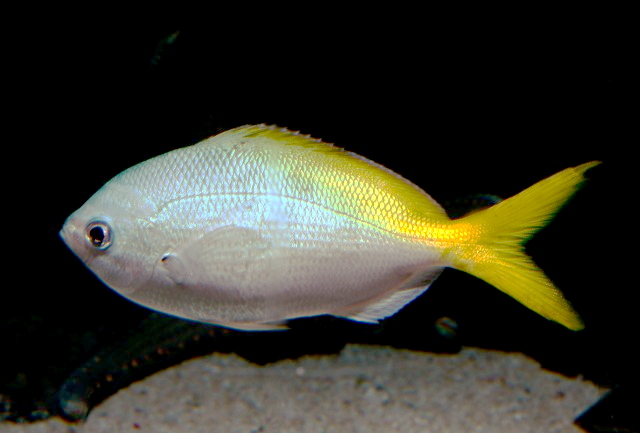

Conservation status
- Least Concern (IUCN 3.1)

Scientific classification
- Kingdom: Animalia
- Phylum: Chordata
- Class: Actinopterygii
- Order: Acanthuriformes
- Family: Lutjanidae
- Genus: Caesio
- Species: C. cuning

Binomial name
- Caesio cuning (Bloch, 1791)

Synonyms
- Sparus cuning Bloch, 1791; Cichla cuning (Bloch, 1791); Caesio erythrogaster Cuvier, 1830; Caesio erythrochilurus Fowler, 1904

= Caesio cuning =

Species of fish

Caesio cuning, the redbelly yellowtail fusilier, yellowtail fusilier, red-bellied fusilier or robust fusilier, is a species of marine ray-finned fish, a fusilier belonging to the family Caesionidae. It is native to the Indian and Western Pacific Oceans.

== Taxonomy ==
Caesio cuning was first formally described in 1791 as Sparus cuning by the German zoologist Marcus Elieser Bloch with the type locality given as Indonesia. This species has been placed in the subgenus Odontonectes. The specific name cuning is derived from the local Indonesian name ikan Tembra Cuning, ikan means "fish".

== Description ==
Caesio cuning has a deep and laterally compressed body. The jaws, vomer, and palatines have small conical teeth. The dorsal and anal fins have scales; the dorsal fin has 10 spines and 14 to 16, typically 15, soft rays while the anal fin contains 3 spines and 10 to 12, usually 11, soft rays. The pectoral fins have 17 to 20 fin rays, normally 18 or 19. This species attains a maximum total length of 60 cm (24 in). The rear of the back, the caudal fin and the dorsal surface of the caudal peduncle are yellow. The rest of the upper body is greyish blue. The lower flanks and abdomen are white or pinkish. The pectoral, pelvic, and anal fins are white to pink. The pectoral fin has black on its axil and on the upper part of its base. The dorsal fin is greyish-blue at the front and yellow at the rear.

== Distribution and habitat ==
Caesio cuning has an Indo-West Pacific range. It ranges from Sri Lanka and southern India east to Fiji, north to southern Japan and south to northern Australia. It occurs at depths between 1 and 60 m (3 ft 3 in and 196 ft 10 in). It often occurs in silty areas where visibility is poor, otherwise it is found in coastal waters, typically above rocky and coral reefs.

== Biology ==
Caesio cuning gathers in midwater schools where they feed on zooplankton such as salps, doliolids, pteropods, heteropods, chaetognaths, among other zooplankton. It is an oviparous species which lays large numbers of small, pelagic eggs.

== Fisheries ==
Caesio cuning is a moderately important target for coastal fisheries. It is common in fish markets in Indonesia and the Philippines. They are caught using drive-in nets, gill nets, traps, trawls and handlines. The fish caught are normally sold as fresh fish but some of the catch is preserved as salted fish. The juveniles are caught to be used as bait by tuna fisheries. There have been population declines in some areas because of overfishing but in other areas populations are stable.
