= Scott and Seringapatam Reefs =

Atoll-like reefs in Western Australia

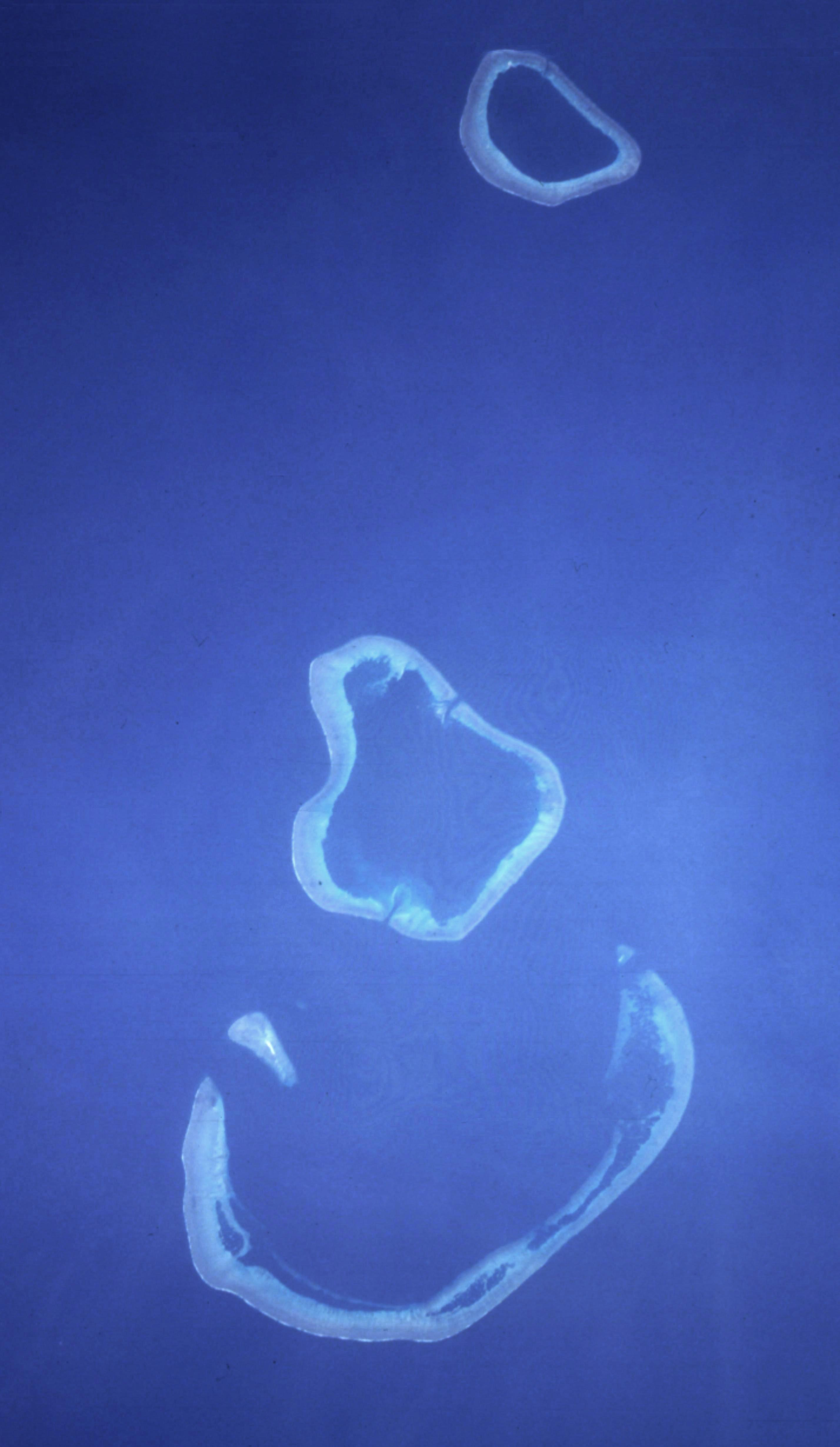
- Scott and Seringapatam Reefs from STS-80 at 359 km (223 mi) altitude on 29 November 1996.
- Interactive map of Scott and Seringapatam Reefs

Geography
- Location: Indian Ocean
- Coordinates: 14°3′S 121°46′E

Administration
- Australia
- State: Western Australia
- Reef: Scott and Seringapatam

Demographics
- Population: 0

Additional information
- Time zone: AWST (UTC+8)

Scott and Seringapatam Reefs is a group of atoll-like reefs in the Timor Sea more than 300 kilometres (190 mi) northwest of Cape Leveque, Western Australia, on the edge of the continental shelf. They are known as Pulau Dato in Indonesian. There are three or four separate reef structures, depending on whether Scott Reef Central is counted separately.

The group is just one of a number of reef formations off the northwest coast of Australia and belongs to Western Australia. Further to the northeast are Ashmore and Cartier Islands, and to the southwest are the Rowley Shoals.

== Location and description ==
Each of the reefs rises steeply from the seabed 400–500 metres (1,300–1,600 ft) below. Much of the reef area dries at low tide, but besides Sandy Islet of Scott Reef South, there are only a few rocks and sandbanks above the high water mark.

- Scott Reef South (also Horseshoe Reef or South Reef) is a large crescent-shaped formation that has a rare and unusual double reef crest. Its lagoon, has depths of over 24 m (79 ft) throughout the greater portion. The reef with its lagoon covers an area of 144 km^{2} (56 sq mi).
- Scott Reef Central, because of its proximity occasionally subsumed within Scott Reef South, lies off West Hook (the western extremity of the crescent of Scott Reef South), with Sandy Islet at 14°03′S 121°46′E (690 metres (2,260 ft) north-south, up to 110 metres (360 ft) wide, with an area of 9 hectares (22 acres)). This reef falls dry to the extent of 0.8–1.6 km (0.50–0.99 mi) from the islet. There is a conspicuous tower on the islet and also a boulder with a height 2.4 m near its northern end. A detached reef, which dries 0.6 m (2 ft 0 in), lies 2.4 km (1.5 mi) northeast of Sandy Islet. The passage between Scott Reef South and Scott Reef Central is only 33 m (108 ft) deep, much less than the passages between the other reefs (366 m (1,201 ft) between Scott Reef South and Scott Reef North).
- Scott Reef North consists of a large, approximately circular-shaped, reef lying 23 km (14 mi) southwest of Seringapatam Reef. The reef is composed of a narrow reef-crest that is backed by broad reef flats – much of which becomes exposed at low tide – and a deep central lagoon that is connected to the open sea by two delta-like channels. The reef with its lagoon covers an area of 106 km^{2} (41 sq mi).
- Seringapatam Reef is located at 13°40′S 122°05′E, 23 km (14 mi) north of Scott Reef North. It is an egg-shaped reef, with a total area of approximately 50 km^{2} (19 sq mi), which is about evenly divided between lagoon and reef flat. Its narrow reef rim encloses a relatively deep lagoon. Much of the reef becomes exposed at low tide. There are large boulders around its edges, with a few sandbanks, which rise about 1.8 m (5 ft 11 in) above the water, on the west side. Seringapatam Reef covers an area of 55 km^{2} (21 sq mi) (including the central lagoon). Captain Edwin Courtenay of Seringapatam was on a whaling voyage when he discovered the reef on 23 August 1839. He named the reef for his ship.

== Browse Basin Liquefied Natural Gas Development ==
Browse LNG was a major liquefied natural gas (LNG) project being developed by Woodside Petroleum, and included the Torosa gas field which lies underneath Scott Reef South and Scott Reef North. The project remains controversial for its environmental impact.

== Coral Bleaching ==
Scott Reef was extensively affected by coral bleaching in 2016 (during a global coral bleaching event), which killed approximately 80% of corals. This followed a previous extensive coral bleaching in 1998 during which "up to 80 per cent of Scott Reef corals died" but from which the reef did recover in the subsequent 10–15 years. Heat stress (indicated by NOAA Coral Reef Watch's Degree Heating Weeks metric) was the highest ever recorded in 2016. Nevertheless, given continuing and measurable climate change and the "direct correlation between increased temperatures and coral bleaching", the consequent increasing frequency of coral bleaching warrants concern that Scott Reef may not recover and survive from the 2016 bleaching event.
