= Rowley Shoals =

Coral reefs off the coast of Western Australia

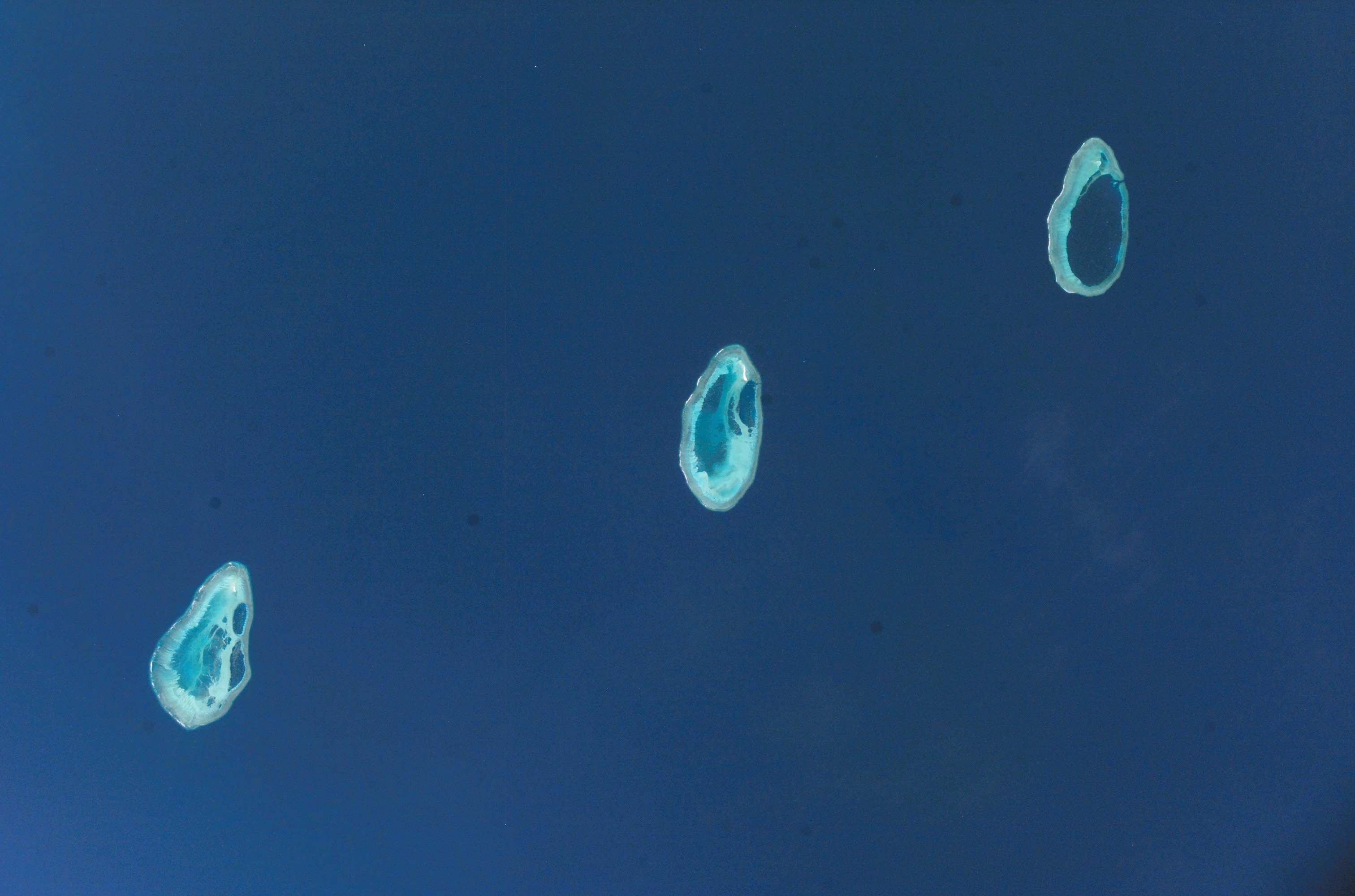
- The Rowley Shoals from the International Space Station at 389 km (242 mi) altitude on 21 September 2002.
- Interactive map of Rowley Shoals

Geography
- Location: Indian Ocean
- Coordinates: 17°20′S 119°20′E

Administration
- Australia
- State: Western Australia
- Shoals: Rowley Shoals

Demographics
- Population: 0

Additional information
- Time zone: AWST (UTC+8)

The Rowley Shoals is a group of three atoll-like coral reefs south of the Timor Sea, about 260 km (160 mi) west of Broome on the northwestern Australian coast, centred on 17°20′S 119°20′E, on the edge of one of the widest continental shelves in the world. Each atoll covers an area of around 80 to 90 km^{2} (31 to 35 sq mi) within the rim of the reef, including the lagoons, while the land areas are negligible. They belong to Western Australia. They all rise steeply from the surrounding ocean floor. To the northeast lie the Scott and Seringapatam Reefs which are located on the same undersea platform.

== Naming and history ==
The Rowley Shoals were so named by Captain Phillip Parker King in 1818 in honour of Captain Rowley who first sighted the Imperieuse Reef in 1800. It is believed that the Rowley Shoals reefs have been visited by fishermen from Indonesia, from at least the mid-18th century. The fishermen were also collecting or hunting for Trepang (holothurians or sea cucumbers), turtle shell, trochus shell and shark fin.

These early visitors apparently knew the Rowley Shoals as Pulau Pulo Dhaoh. In later years, fishermen from Roti Island, south of Timor, also visited the Rowley Shoals, which they knew as Pulau Bawa Angin. The individual reefs were also given names, Mermaid Reef being called Pulau Manjariti, Clerke Reef was Pulau Tengah and Imperieuse Reef was Pulau Matsohor.

== Description ==
- Mermaid Reef, the northeastern one of the three reefs at 17°06′S 119°37′E, is an atoll with a large lagoon enclosed by a rim of coral, which falls dry. There are many drying patches in the lagoon. On the northeast side of the reef, there is a passage, about 60 m wide, leading into the lagoon. Mermaid Reef rises steeply from the surrounding ocean floor, which is 440 m deep. The atoll was named in 1818 by Captain Philip Parker King, who discovered the reef and named it after his ship HMS Mermaid.
- Clerke Reef (also called Minstrel Shoal), at 17°19′S 119°21′E, lies about 23 km southwest of Mermaid Reef. The reef has a length of about 15 km north–south, and a width of about 6 km. Near the northern end of the reef lies Bedwell Islet, a bare sand cay about 2 m high. On the eastern and western sides of the reef there are a number of boulders which fall dry. A narrow passage leads to a lagoon, with many detached coral patches within the reef. Clerke Reef rises steeply from the surrounding ocean floor, which is 390 m deep. It was also named by Captain Philip Parker King, after Captain Clerke, who had reported it from a whaler between 1800 and 1809.
- Imperieuse Reef, at 17°35′S 118°55′E, lies about 35 km southwest of Clerke Reef and is the southwesternmost of Rowley Shoals. It is about 16 km in length north-south and has a width of about 8 km. On the southeastern edge of the reef there are numerous coral boulders, which rise about 3 m above the water mark. Large areas of the reef fall dry at low water and there are two lagoons, which each contain many coral patches within. Cunningham Islet, a small sand cay 3.7 m high and devoid of vegetation, is located close within the northern extremity of the reef, and is surrounded by a small lagoon, 93 m wide. The islet is the location of a lighthouse, Imperieuse Reef Light. Imperieuse Reef rises steeply from the surrounding ocean floor, which is 230 m deep. The reef was named by Captain Phillip Parker King after the ship (HMS Imperieuse) from which it was sighted by Captain Rowley in 1800.

== Geological history ==
The Rowley Shoals, along with Ningaloo Reef, the Ashmore and Cartier Islands and the Scott and Seringapatam Reefs, are the remnants of a Miocene aged barrier reef system which during the Middle Miocene around 16 million years ago spanned over 2,000 kilometres (1,200 mi) along the northwest Australian coast, but which was largely drowned due to tectonic subsidence during the late Miocene around 10 million years ago, with the Rowley Shoals having existed as isolated mounds since that time. Originally a fourth shoal existed to the southwest of the three existing mounds, but this reef was drowned by the Early Pleistocene, approximately 2.4 million years ago.

== Conservation ==
Mermaid Reef is listed on Australia's Commonwealth Heritage List and all three reefs of the Rowley Shoals were registered on the former Register of the National Estate. The Shoals are the only known origin and home of several unusual species, including the Western Australian sculpin, and so are of major ecological value.

- The Rowley Shoals Marine Park covers the Clerke and Imperieuse Reefs. Declared in 1990 and extended in 2004, the marine park is managed by the Department of Environment and Conservation (DEC) of Western Australia.
- The Mermaid Reef Marine Park protects the northeastern Mermaid Reef, it is an Australian marine park managed by Parks Australia.
- The Argo-Rowley Terrace Marine Park is adjacent to, and encompasses the Mermaid Reef and Rowley Shoals marine parks.

== Tourism ==
Since about 1977 charter boats based from Broome began operating deep sea fishing and diving expeditions to the reefs and seas around. Since this time interest in the area has grown considerably and the Rowley Shoals has achieved a reputation for offering some of the best diving in Australia.
