= NORFANZ Expedition =

- Country: New Zealand; Australia
- Location: New Zealand; Lord Howe Island; Norfolk Island; Tasman Sea
- Country of origin: Australia; New Zealand
- Start: May 2003
- End: June 2003
- Goal: Deep-sea exploration
- Funder: Australian Government; New Zealand Government
- Vessels: RV Tangaroa
- Participants: Clive Douglas Roberts; Mark McGrouther; John Paxton; Andrew L. Stewart; Kerryn Parkinson

The Norfolk Ridge / Lord Howe Rise Biodiversity Discovery Survey (NORFANZ) was an expedition undertaken in May to June 2003 to research the biodiversity found in and around the Norfolk Ridge and the Lord Howe Rise.

== Etyonomy ==
The species Myopiarolis norfanz was named in honour of the expedition.
