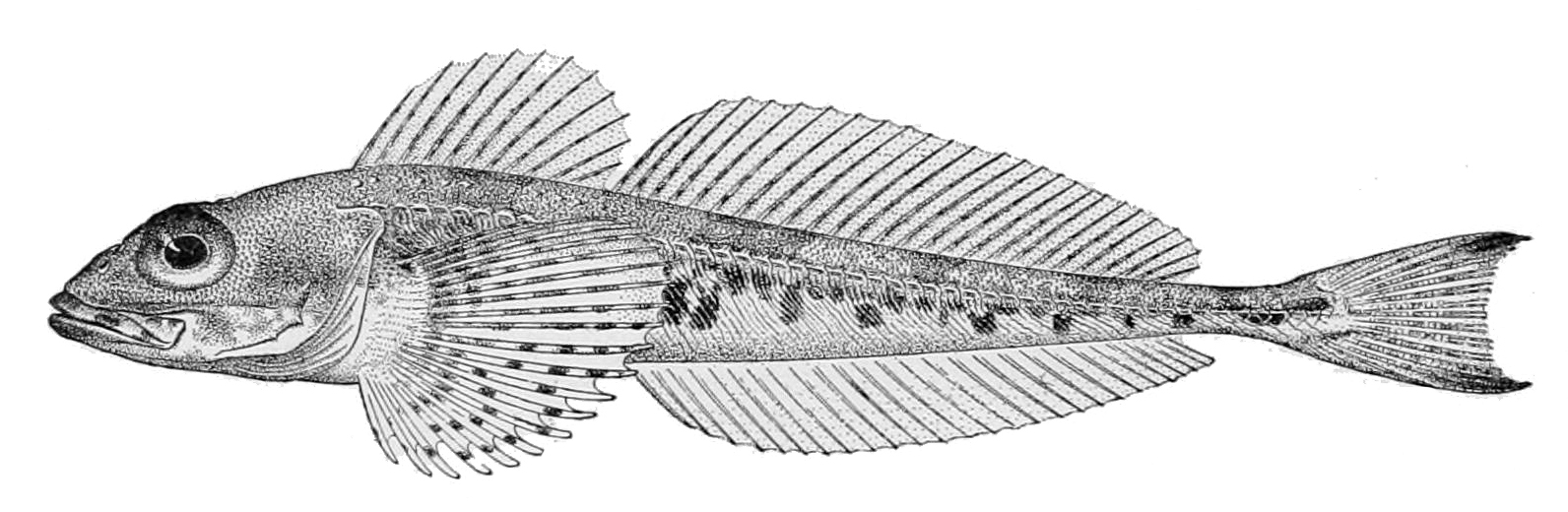
- Alaska Sculpin (T. metopias)
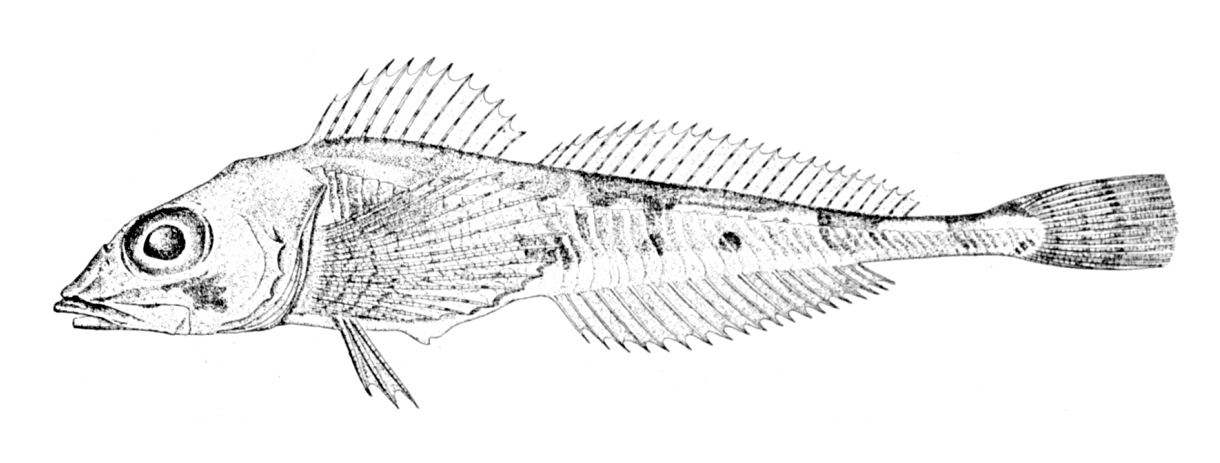
- Ribbed Sculpin (T. pingelii)

Scientific classification
- Kingdom: Animalia
- Phylum: Chordata
- Class: Actinopterygii
- Division: Teleostei
- Order: Perciformes
- Suborder: Cottoidei
- Family: Psychrolutidae
- Genus: Triglops; J. C. H. Reinhardt, 1830

Type species
- Triglops pingelii Reinhardt, 1837

Synonyms
- Elanura Gilbert, 1896; Prionistius Bean, 1884; Sternias Jordan & Evermann, 1898

= Triglops =

Genus of fishes

Triglops is a genus of marine ray-finned fishes belonging to the family Cottidae, the typical sculpins. These fishes are found in the North Pacific, Arctic and North Atlantic Oceans.

== Taxonomy ==
Triglops was first proposed as a monospecific subgenus of Cottus in 1830 by the Danish zoologist Johan Reinhardt when he described Triglops pingelii, giving its type locality as Quanneoen, south of Frederikshaab in western Greenland. The 5th edition of Fishes of the World classifies the genus Triglops within the subfamily Cottinae of the family Cottidae, however, other authors classify the genus within the subfamily Triglopinae of the family Psychrolutidae.

== Species ==
Triglops currently contains 10 recognized species in this genus:

- Triglops dorothy Pietsch & J. W. Orr, 2006 (Dorothy's sculpin)
- Triglops forficatus (Gilbert, 1896) (Scissortail sculpin)
- Triglops jordani (Schmidt, 1904) (Jordan's sculpin)
- Triglops macellus (T. H. Bean, 1884) (Roughspine sculpin)
- Triglops metopias Gilbert & Burke, 1912 (Alaskan sculpin)
- Triglops murrayi Günther, 1888 (Moustache sculpin)
- Triglops nybelini A. S. Jensen, 1944 (Bigeye sculpin)
- Triglops pingelii J. C. H. Reinhardt, 1837 (Ribbed sculpin)
- Triglops scepticus Gilbert, 1896 (Spectacled sculpin)
- Triglops xenostethus Gilbert, 1896 (Scaly-breasted sculpin)

== Characteristics ==
Triglops sculpins have slender, elongate, cylindrical to compressed or flattened bodies with a small head, which may also be slightly depressed or compressed, with a small horizontal or slightly oblique mouth. They have clearly separated dorsal fins, the first containing between 9 and 13 slender spines and the second having between 19 and 31 soft rays. The anal fin is supported by 18 to 32 soft rays. This genus is distinguished from the other marine sculpin genera by having the anus positioned halfway between the origins of the pelvic and anal fins, a feature shared with the genera Clinocottus and Leiocottus. The lateral line is made up of large scales which resemble plates and the scales underneath these form obvious rows of very small serrated plates, these are within close-set diagonal skin folds, a feature shared solely with Jordania. There are four preopercular spines and the branchiostegal membranes are joined but do not connect to the isthmus. They have vomerine teeth but no palatine teeth. The pelvic fin has a single spine and three soft rays. There are no cutaneous cirri on the head. The fishes in this genus range from a maximum published standard length of 9.7 cm (3.8 in) in T. xenostethus up to 30.8 cm (12.1 in) in T. scepticus.

== Distribution and habitat ==
Triglops sculpins are widespread in northern seas. In the Pacific Ocean they occur from the Sea of Japan and Sea of Okhotsk east into the Bering Sea, the Aleutian Islands the Gulf of Alaska south to Puget Sound. In the Arctic they are found from the Chuckchi and Beaufort Seas east to the Queen Elizabeth Islands and Hudson Bay and into the Atlantic south as far as Scotland and east to the Barents Sea, Kara Sea and Laptev Sea. They are benthic fishes which are found over varied substrates including rock, gravel, mud or sand at depths varying from the surface down to 930 m (3,050 ft), although they are commonest between 18 and 600 m (59 and 1,969 ft).

== Biology ==
Triglops sculpins are predators of invertebrates such as polychaetes, crustaceans and sometimes smaller fishes. They spawn from late summer into the winter, laying between 100 and over 2,500 demersal eggs.
