= APETx1 =

Peptide toxin from the venom of the aggregating anemone

Identifiers
- Organism: Anthopleura elegantissima
- Symbol: N/A
- PDB: 1WQK
- RefSeq (Prot): P61541.1
- UniProt: P61541
Search for
- Structures: Swiss-model
- Domains: InterPro

APETx1 is a peptide toxin from the venom of the sea anemone Anthopleura elegantissima. The toxin acts as a gating modifier on the human ether-à-go-go-related gene (hERG) channel, a type of voltage-gated potassium channel, and as a blocker of voltage-gated sodium channels, including Nav1.2 and Nav1.8.

== Sources ==
APETx1 is a peptide toxin purified from the venom of the sea anemone Anthopleura elegantissima, which produces multiple toxins.

== Chemistry ==
APETx1 is a 42-amino acid basic peptide toxin with an isoelectric point of 9.28. The peptide contains three disulfide bridges, and it has a molecular mass of 4,551.99 Da. Furthermore, the secondary structure of the peptide consists of four-stranded anti-parallel beta-sheets. Through its folding pattern, APETx1 is classified as a member of the Defensin family.

APETx1 has an 88% homology with APETx4, another Anthopleura elegantissima toxin that targets hERG channels. Moreover, APETx1 has 54% sequence homology with BDS1, which is also produced by sea anemones and targets voltage-gated potassium channels as well. Furthermore, the secondary structure of APETx1 is similar to that of BDS1, yet differs by at least one beta-turn. The scorpion venom ErgTx also targets the hERG channel. However, ErgTx has only a 20% sequence homology with APETx1.

== Target ==
APETx1 inhibits the hERG channel, a type of voltage-gated potassium channel. APETx1 is thought to interact with three aromatic residues (Y5, Y32 and F33), two basic residues (K8 and K18) and three aliphatic residues (G7, G31 and K18) on the S3b region of the hERG channel. On the S3b helix, the amino acids on positions 514 and 518 are on the same side and are both extracellularly exposed, allowing them to bind with APETx1. This region of the S3b helix contains the voltage sensor of the hERG channel. hERG currents are inhibited by APETx1 with an IC50 of 34 nM. Among the three hERG isoforms, hERG2 is unresponsive to APETx1, whereas hERG1 and hERG3 are equally sensitive to the toxin.

In addition, APETx1 blocks several mammalian voltage-gated sodium channels, including Nav1.2 with an IC50 of 31 nM, and Nav1.8 with an IC50 of 92 nM. It has no effect on invertebrate sodium channels.

== Mode of action ==
APETx1 alters the activation of hERG channels in a voltage-dependent manner. The toxin shifts the activation curve to more positive potentials and causes a negative shift in the inactivation curve. However, like ErgTx, it preferentially binds the channel in its closed state. The fact that APETx1 binds to the voltage sensor region of hERG and that it inhibits only 80% of the hERG channels at maximum affinity suggests that APETx1 is a gating modifier.

APETx1 blocks voltage-gated sodium channels by binding to neurotoxin site 1, similar to tetrodotoxin.

== Toxicity ==
APETx1 does not induce neurotoxicity after injection into the central nervous system of mice.

== As a potential drug target ==
As hERG channels are overexpressed in colorectal cancers, inhibition of these channels through APETx1 might lead to a reduction in tumor growth.
