= APEKTx1 =

Peptide toxin

Identifiers
- Symbol: N/A
- RefSeq: P86862.1
- UniProt: P86862
Search for
- Structures: Swiss-model
- Domains: InterPro

Kunitz-type serine protease inhibitor APEKTx1 is a peptide toxin derived from the sea anemone Anthopleura elegantissima. This toxin has a dual function, acting both as a serine protease inhibitor and as a selective and potent pore blocker of K_{v}1.1, a shaker related voltage-gated potassium channel.

== Sources ==
APEKTx1 is a potent toxin purified from the sea anemone A. elegantissima. Besides APEKTx1, other toxins such as APETx1, APE1-1, APE1-2, APE2-2, ApC, and APETx2 have been identified in A. elegantissima.

== Chemistry ==
APEKTx1 monomer structure prediction (Alpha-fold model). The average per residue confidence (pLDDT) is 91.46%. The levels of confidence of the model are color coded: dark blue very high (pLDDT > 90), light blue high (90 > pLDDT > 70), orange low (70 > pLDDT > 50), and yellow very low (pLDDT < 50).

This peptide has 65 amino acids crosslinked by 3 disulphide bridges, and has a molecular mass of 7475 Da. It acts as a monomer. The toxin belongs to the type 2 sea anemone peptides targeting voltage-gated K channels. Other type 2 toxins are the kalicludines from Anemonia sulcata, which selectively block K_{v}1.2 channels, and SHTX II from Stichodactyla haddoni. Structural homology is also shared with the basic pancreatic trypsin inhibitor (BPTI), a very potent Kunitz-type protease inhibitor, and dendrotoxins (DTX I and α-DTX), which are potent inhibitors of voltage-gated potassium channels.

APEKTx1
Amino acid sequence
INSICLLPKKQGFCRARFPRFYYNSSTRRCEMFY

YGGCGGNANNFNTLEECEKVCLGYGEAWKAP

== Target ==
APEKTx1 is a highly selective blocker of the voltage-gated potassium channel K_{v}1.1 with no effect on other tested potassium channels (K_{v}1.2, K_{v}1.3, K_{v}1.4, K_{v}1.5, K_{v}1.6, Shaker IR, K_{v}2.1, K_{v}3.1, K_{v}4.2 and K_{v}4.3). APEKTx1 selectively blocks K_{v}1.1 channels with an IC50 value of 0.9 nM, which makes it between a 700 to 3000 times more potent inhibitor than the two known sea anemone peptides targeted against K_{v} channels (kalicludines and SHTX II). APEKTx1 is thought to interact with K_{v}1.1 through the aliphatic residue alanine (A352), an acidic residue glutamate (E353), and an aromatic residue tyrosine (Y379), as a mutation in these sites causes a loss in affinity of the toxin for K_{v}1.1. These residues are located in the H5-loop between the S5 and S6 domains and are part of the channel’s pore.

In addition, APEKTx1 acts as a potent trypsin inhibitor (K_{d}= 124 nM), probably a competitive one. However, trypsin inhibition is more potent (as it has a higher affinity) in BPTI, which can be explained by the presence of Phe13 and Pro19 in APEKTx1, causing an unfavorable interaction.

== Mode of action ==
APEKTx1 works by blocking the K_{v}1.1 channel in its open conformation, showing no effect on the voltage-dependence of channel gating. In contrast to certain homologous toxins like DTX-K, APEKTx1 can completely block the K^{+} current. The binding site of the toxin is presumed to be located at the extracellular side, as evidenced by the rapid inhibition of current through K_{v}1.1 channels and the reversible binding upon washout. Unlike the irreversible binding of DTX K dendrotoxins (which are homologous to APEKTx1), APEKTx1's action is reversible. This is possibly due to the substitution of a lysine (either Lys3 or Lys26) with a neutral arginine in APEKTx1. APEKTx1 likely contains a dyad: a pair of amino acid residues composed of a basic residue and a hydrophobic residue separated from each other by 6.6 ± 1.0 Å that interacts with the aromatic residues on the P-loop participating in the channel-toxin interaction affinity. APEKTx1’s dyad is formed by Arg15 and Phe13, separated by 6.2 Å, contributing to the formation of a physical barrier that opposes the K^{+} efflux. Presumably, the side chain of Arg15 enters the K_{v}1.1 pore and interacts with the Asp377 residues, while Phe13 interacts with hydrophobic residues, including Tyr375, which is critically involved in the interaction affinity with the sea anemones toxins.

The interaction of APEKTx1 with K_{v}1.1 channels follows the kinetic behavior of a bimolecular reaction, meaning that the rate of binding depends on the concentration of both reactants (toxin and channel).
