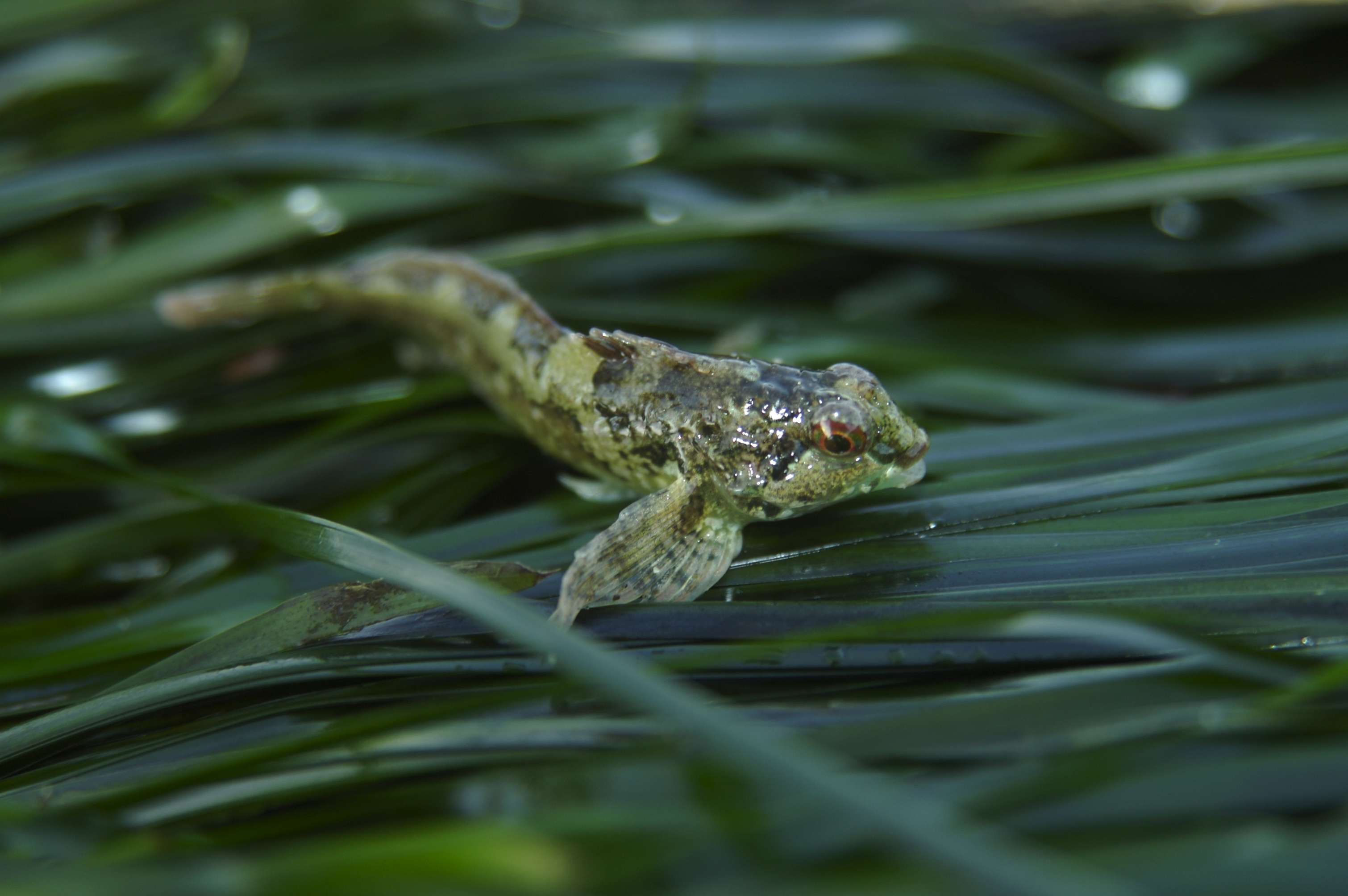
- Tidepool sculpin (O. maculosus)

Scientific classification
- Kingdom: Animalia
- Phylum: Chordata
- Class: Actinopterygii
- Order: Perciformes
- Suborder: Cottoidei
- Superfamily: Cottoidea
- Family: Psychrolutidae
- Genus: Oligocottus; Girard, 1856

Type species
- Oligocottus maculosus Girard, 1856

Synonyms
- Eximia Greeley, 1899; Rusciculus Greeley, 1899; Stelgidonotus Gilbert & Thompson, 1905; Greeleya Jordan, 1920

= Oligocottus =

Genus of fishes

Oligocottus is a genus of marine ray-finned fishes belonging to the family Psychrolutidae, the marine sculpins. These sculpins are found in the northern and eastern Pacific Ocean.

== Taxonomy ==
Oligocottus was first proposed as a monospecific genus in 1856 by the French biologist Charles Frédéric Girard when he described Oligocottus maculosus from Tomales Bay, San Francisco, California. The 5th edition of Fishes of the World classifies this genus within the subfamily Cottinae of the family Cottidae, however, other authors classify the genus within the subfamily Oligocottinae of the family Psychrolutidae. The genus has been found to be a monophyletic grouping with the saddleback sculpin as the more basal of the four species with the other three species creating a polytomy.

== Etymology ==
Oligocottus prefixes oligos, meaning "small", with Cottus, the type species of the family Cottidae. This is an allusion to the small size of O. maculosus.

== Species ==
There are four species listed in this genus:

- Oligocottus maculosus Girard, 1856 – Tidepool sculpin
- Oligocottus rimensis (Greeley, 1899) – Saddleback sculpin
- Oligocottus rubellio (Greeley, 1899) – Rosy sculpin
- Oligocottus snyderi Greeley, 1898 – Fluffy sculpin

== Characteristics ==
Oligocottus sculpins are characterised within the sculpins by having the anus located immediately to the front of the origin of the anal fin, the intromittent organ of the males is shaped like a long, thin cone and the front rays of the males' anal fins are modified. These sculpins are small fishes, with the largest being the rosy sculpin with a maximum published total length of 10 cm (3.9 in).

== Distribution and habitat ==
Oligocottus sculpins are found in the North Pacific, they are found off the along the Pacific coasts of North America from Alaska to Baja California. The tidepool sculpin has been reported from the Sea of Okhotsk and the Bering Sea but records west of the Gulf of Alaska are considered doubtful. They are found in the intertidal and subtidal zones and have the ability to breathe air.
