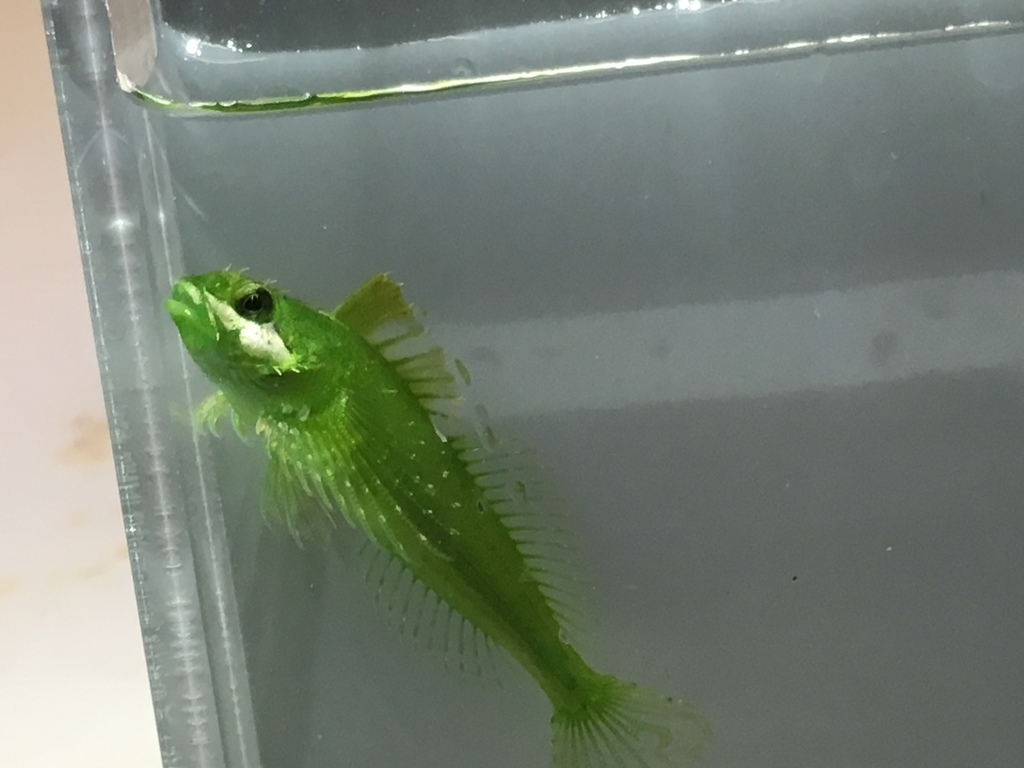

Conservation status
- Secure (NatureServe)

Scientific classification
- Kingdom: Animalia
- Phylum: Chordata
- Class: Actinopterygii
- Order: Perciformes
- Suborder: Cottoidei
- Family: Psychrolutidae
- Genus: Clinocottus
- Species: C. acuticeps

Binomial name
- Clinocottus acuticeps (Gilbert, 1896)

Synonyms
- Oligocottus acuticeps Gilbert, 1896; Blennicottus acuticeps (Gilbert, 1896); Oxycottus acuticeps (Gilbert, 1896)

= Clinocottus acuticeps =

Species of fish

Clinocottus acuticeps, the sharpnose sculpin, is a species of marine ray-finned fish belonging to the family Cottidae, the typical sculpins. This sculpin is found in the eastern Pacific Ocean.

== Taxonomy ==
Clinocottus acuticeps was first formally described as Oligocottus acuticeps in 1896 by the American ichthyologist Charles Henry Gilbert with its type locality given as Unalaska harbor, Unalaska in the Aleutian Islands. The genus Clinocottus has been resolved as paraphyletic or polyphyletic by some workers and that this species is apparently not closely related to the other species included in the genus. This species is the only species subgenus Oxycottus which was proposed as a genus by David Starr Jordan and Evermann in 1898. The specific name, acuticeps, means "pointed head", alluding to the sharply pointed snout.

== Description ==
Clinocottus acuticeps is identified by its flattened, three branched papilla near the anus and the possession of cirri on the eyeballs, head, the lateral line and at the tip of each spine in the dorsal fin. The lateral line is high near the head, curves down along the middle of the flanks and straightens as it nears the caudal peduncle. Each of the first 15 pores has a slender cirrus. The penultimate ray in the anal fin is the longest. The pectoral fins extend as far as or just beyond the origin of the anal fin. The caudal fin is rounded. The dorsal fins are supported by between 7 and 9 spines and 14 and 16 soft rays while the anal fin has 13 to 16 soft rays. They reach a maximum published total length of 6.4 cm (2.5 in). They vary on color, depending upon their habitat, sometimes the color is an almost uniform bright green, however, the typical color is green to light brown on the upper body marked with dark wedge-shaped saddles, the widest part being the lowest. They sometimes have a dark horizontal stripe along the lateral line which may be broken by pale spots. The underside is creamy to white. there are three dark radiating lines running from the eye, the first runs to the snout, the next down to the rear of the mouth and the third backwards to the base of the spine on the preoperculum. There is a dark blotch on the spiny dorsal fin between the first and the third spine. All the other fins, other than the plain pelvic fins, are typically dusky with indistinct mottling or barring.

== Distribution and habitat ==
Clinocottus acuticeps is found in the Eastern Pacific Ocean along the North American Pacific coast from the Bering Sea to the Big Sur River in central California. It is found at depths of between 0 and 20 m where it is common in rocky intertidal and subtidal areas, as well as on sand and among Zostera and macroalgae. They may desert tidal pools if the condition of the water becomes unsuitable and this species sometimes enters fresh water. This species shows a preference for substrates of sand, gravel and rock with mussels of the genus Mytilus.

== Biology ==
Clinocottus acuticeps is a facultative air breather and can survive out of water. It feeds on small benthic invertebrates found in tide pools and in algae. Spawning takes place in the spring and summer. This species has been recorded as a host for the copepod ectoparasite Haemobaphes intermedius.
