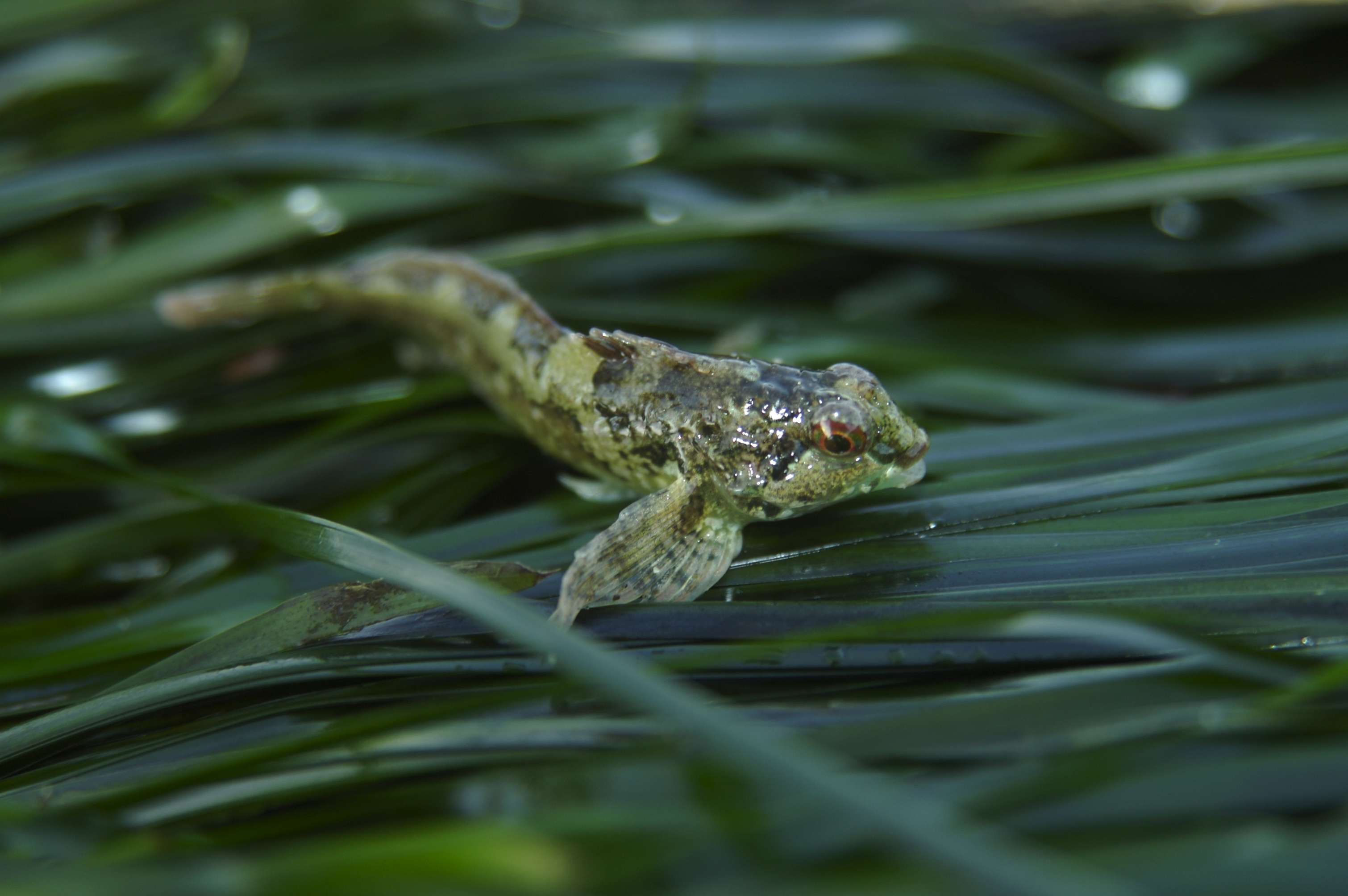

Scientific classification
- Kingdom: Animalia
- Phylum: Chordata
- Class: Actinopterygii
- Order: Perciformes
- Suborder: Cottoidei
- Family: Psychrolutidae
- Genus: Oligocottus
- Species: O. maculosus

Binomial name
- Oligocottus maculosus Girard, 1856

= Tidepool sculpin =

Species of fish

The tidepool sculpin (Oligocottus maculosus) is a fish species in the sculpin family Psychrolutidae that ranges from the Bering Sea to southern California. Individuals reach up to 8 cm (3 in) in length and are common in tidepools.

== Description ==
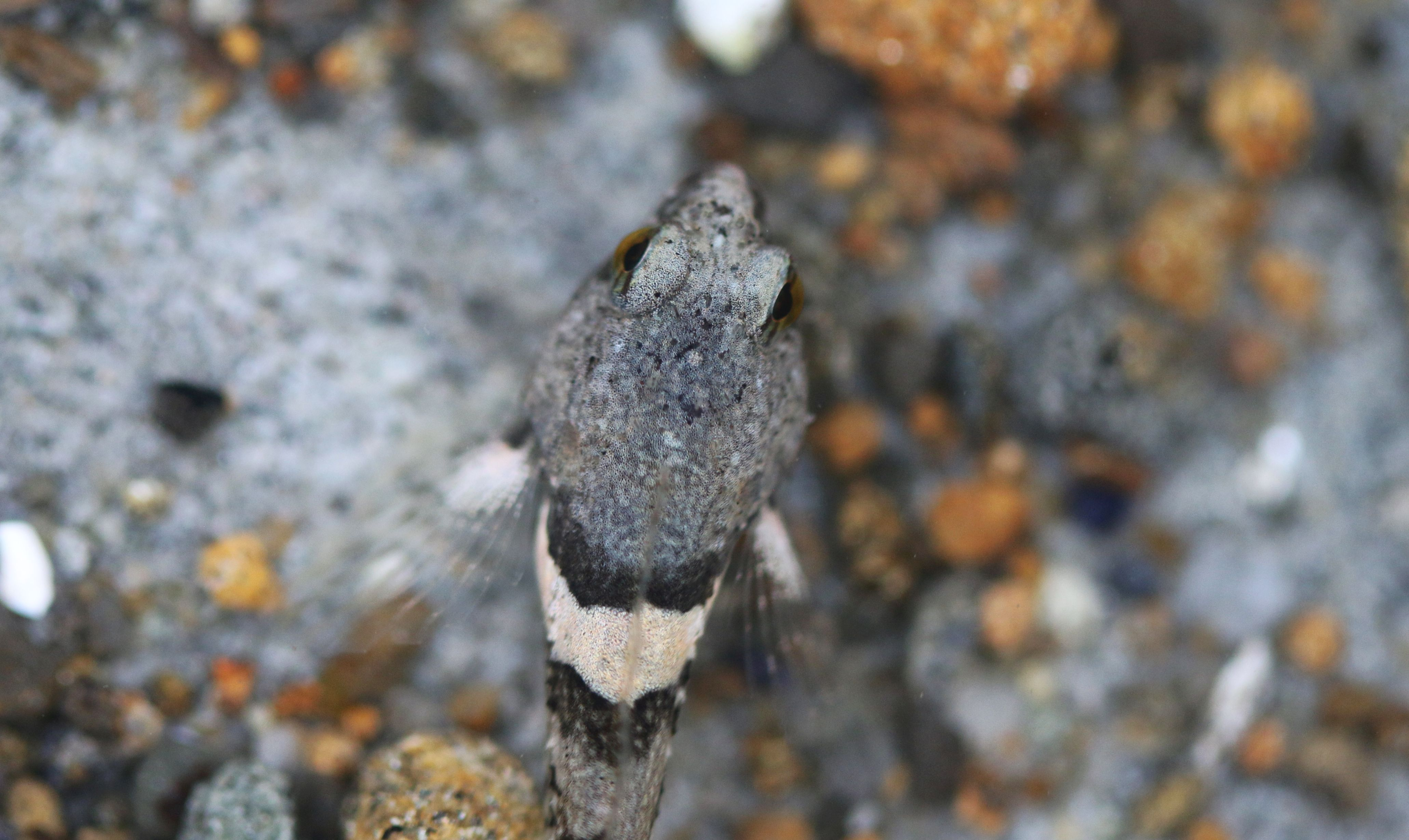
Top-down view, showing width of head

The tidepool sculpin grows to a length of about 8 cm (3 in) and has a large head, tapering body, and spiny fins. It has a single pre-opercular spine and tufts of cirri on the top of the head but not on the body below the dorsal fin as the fluffy sculpin (Oligocottus snyderi) does. It varies considerably in colour, is often marbled in grey, brown and white, but may be reddish or greenish and can change colour rapidly so as to camouflage itself.

== Distribution and habitat ==
The tidepool sculpin is found in the northeastern Pacific Ocean from the Bering Sea to southern California. Its depth range is from the intertidal zone down to about 100 m (330 ft). It is tolerant of both brackish water and normal seawater. It is found higher up the shore and is more tolerant of warmer water than other species of sculpin such as the fluffy sculpin.

== Ecology ==
The tidepool sculpin is a common small fish in pools in the intertidal zone of rocky coasts, flitting from one hiding place to another. It shows great homing ability, returning each time the tide recedes to the pool in which it has taken up residence. It has been shown to have the ability to return to its home pool from a distance of 102 m (335 ft) after having been displaced for six months. It is a predator, feeding on small invertebrates such as isopods, amphipods, gastropod molluscs, polychaete worms and barnacles, as well as insects that happen to fall into the water. Small amounts of algae also form part of the diet. Sculpins are preyed upon by diving birds and by predatory fishes when the tide is high. When the seas are rough it moves higher up the shore. It can leave the water and breathe air, exchanging both oxygen and carbon dioxide, while hiding in a damp spot, and it attempts to evade predators by flapping about or wriggling in an effort to reach a more favourable location.

The fish become mature when about 35 mm (1.4 in) in length. The male has modified anal fin rays, and either they are used as claspers with fertilisation being internal, or the male clasps the female and fertilises the eggs as they are being laid. Small clusters of eggs are laid in late winter, often in crevices or empty barnacle shells. The larvae are planktonic in the open sea; in embayments, they sometimes school near the seabed. After thirty to sixty days the larvae move back to rock pools and become juvenile fish. Their growth rate is affected if they are too crowded in a pool.
