= Arthur White Greeley =

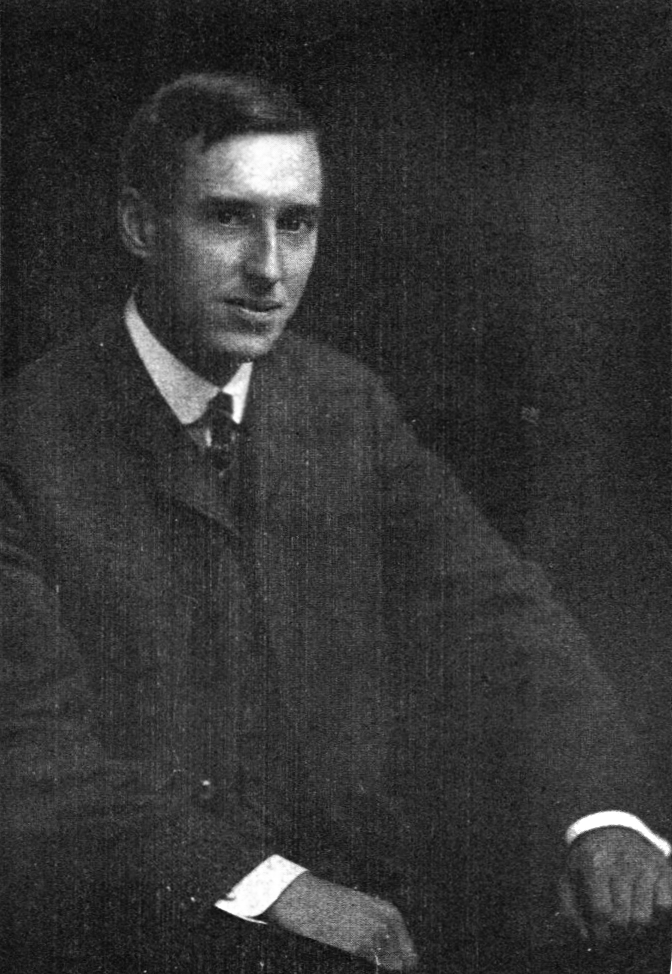
- Born: June 13, 1875; Oswego, New York
- Died: March 15, 1904 (aged 28); St. Louis, Missouri
- Education: University of Chicago; Stanford University
- Scientific career
- Workplaces: Washington University in St. Louis; San Diego Normal School

Arthur White Greeley (June 13, 1875 – March 15, 1904) was an American physiologist and ichthyologist. Greeley was born in Oswego, New York, the eldest of two sons of Frank Norton Greeley, a Congregational clergyman, and Anna Cheney (Buckhout) Greeley. His brother William would go on to become chief forester of the U.S. Forest Service. He graduated from Stanford University in 1898, and spent one year as a graduate student in zoology, during which he went to Alaska with the fur-seal expedition and to Brazil with the Banner-Agassiz expedition, where he made most of the biological collections. The following year he was an instructor at San Diego Normal School (now San Diego State University), leaving there to enter the University of Chicago as fellow in physiology. Two years later he took his doctorate of philosophy under Jacques Loeb with a thesis on the action of low temperatures on micro-organisms, and was then appointed Assistant Professor of Zoology at the Washington University in St. Louis, Missouri. For three summers he was a member of the staff of instruction in physiology at the Marine Biological Laboratory at Wood's Hole, Massachusetts. He died in St. Louis, after an operation for appendicitis, on March 15, 1904, at the age of twenty-eight.

Greeley described several species of sculpin, including the saddleback sculpin, rosy sculpin, fluffy sculpin and the bald sculpin. He is commemorated in the names of the fish genus Greeleya and Sphoeroides greeleyi, as well as the sea slug Diaulula greeleyi, and the sea snail Crassispira greeleyi.
