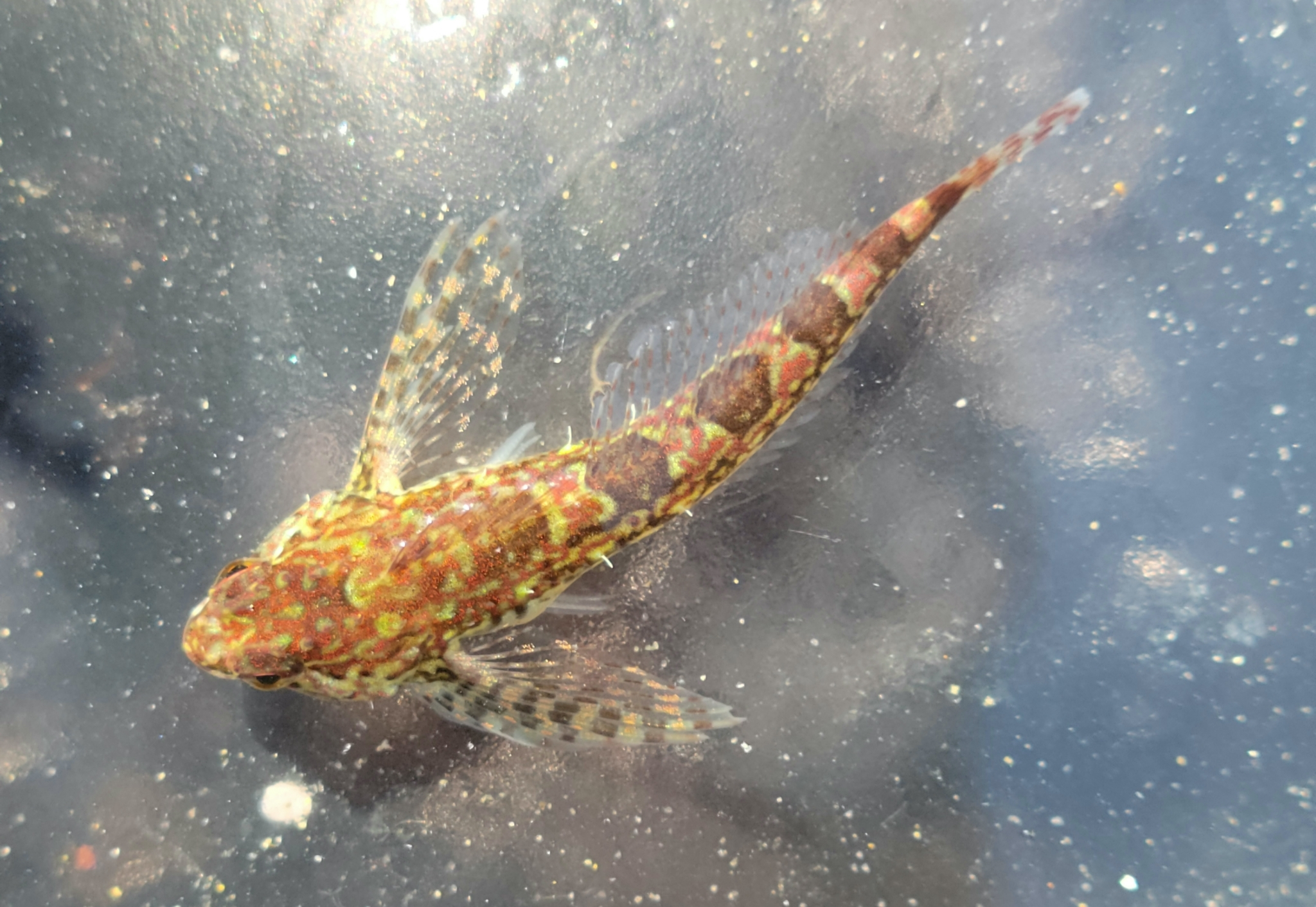

Scientific classification
- Kingdom: Animalia
- Phylum: Chordata
- Class: Actinopterygii
- Order: Perciformes
- Suborder: Cottoidei
- Family: Psychrolutidae
- Genus: Oligocottus
- Species: O. rimensis

Binomial name
- Oligocottus rimensis (Greeley, 1899)

Synonyms
- Rusciculus rimensis Greeley, 1899; Stelgidonotus latifrons Gilbert & Thompson, 1905

= Saddleback sculpin =

Species of fish

The saddleback sculpin (Oligocottus rimensis) is a species of fish in the sculpin family Cottidae. It is known to inhabit the North American shore of the Pacific Ocean. It is a very understudied fish with limited knowledge of behavioral patterns, lifecycle and reproduction.

== Taxonomy ==
The saddleback sculpin was originally described by Arthur White Greeley as Rusciculus Rimensis,^{[5]} and later classified as Stelgidonotus latifrons by Gilbert and Thompson in 1905^{[9]}. The subfamily Oligocottinae was introduced in 1926 using morphological similarities between the Oligocottus type as well as several additional characteristics. These included: three soft pelvic rays, a moderate number of dorsal spines, preopercular spines omitting the antler like processes, and the stipulation that there were bands of palatine teeth ^{[3]}. Originally, these members of Oligocottinae were split into two tribes which now make up the two modern day genus of Clinocottus and Oligocottus. In 1944, Bolin re-circumscribed the genus Oligocottus to include the saddleback sculpin. Support for this genus as a strong monophyletic clade was later supported by DNA analysis.^{[3]}

== Description ==
Saddleback sculpins are a small fish in size averaging 4cm long but able to grow to a maximum of 6.2cm long ^{[1]}. They have an elongated body which tapers off from a blunt round head to tail. The head has a single preopercular spine which can be used to identify the Saddleback from other sculpins ^{[7]}. The prickles running along their whole body can also be used to identify them ^{[3]}. They have five to six gill rakers and the body is covered in papillae ^{[4]} with larger scales running laterally, usually in front of the pores. The dorsal fin has 8-10 spines with 16-19 rays, the pectoral fin has 13-15 rays, the pelvic fin has 1 spine and 3 rays, the anal fin has 13-15 rays, and the caudal fin is slightly rounded ^{[7]}. They have an olivaceous color pattern ^{[9]} varying from shades of red and green dorsally to tan and green ventrally with dorsal mottlings creating 5 distinct saddle-like markings ^{[1]}. The head has a black spot on top and a broken band, sometimes branching down running laterally along the body ^{[5]}.

== Distribution and habitat ==
The saddleback sculpin is distributed along the west coast of North America from the sub tropics of Guerra Negro in Mexico ^{[7]} up to the temperate seas off Alaska [6]. Their preferred habitat has been the lower part of the intertidal zone among rocky substrates, kelp-based habitats ^{[2]}, and eel grass. It is possible that their distribution is larger than currently known as research on them is minimal. There is also indication in related works that they may also live in the subtidal zones.

== Reproduction and life-cycle ==
Very little is known about the details of the Saddleback Sculpin's life-cycle due to few studies on it. Despite this, through related studies there can be some indication of behavioral patterns found. It is indicated that they follow a seasonal migration occurring in much higher densities in the intertidal zone during the months of November to February. This is not in correlation with changing food dynamics and therefore is most likely a result of reproductive patterns. On this theory adults come to the intertidal zone to reproduce as egg predation is greatly reduced compared to subtidal zones ^{[8]}.

== Feeding ==
Saddleback sculpins are specialized feeders with a smaller diet compared to some other sculpin species ^{[8]}. Although they follow a set diet, the Saddleback Ssculpin's feeding habits change as they develop. They predominantly consume gammarid amphipods, sphaeromatid isopods, and harpacticoid copepods. As juveniles, they mostly consume harpacticoids which is replaced with gammarids as they reach adulthood^{[8]}.

== Ecology ==
Unlike many other sculpin species, the saddleback sculpin does not remain within the intertidal zone. Instead, it has seasonal intertidal residency therefore its habitat varies ^{[8]}. As an adaptation to the variation in habitats and the difficulties of living in the intertidal zone the saddleback sculpin is capable breathing and therefore can live for extended periods of time outside a body of water ^{[8]}. This ability gives it a distinct advantage over competing species and allows better protection to its numerous predators.
