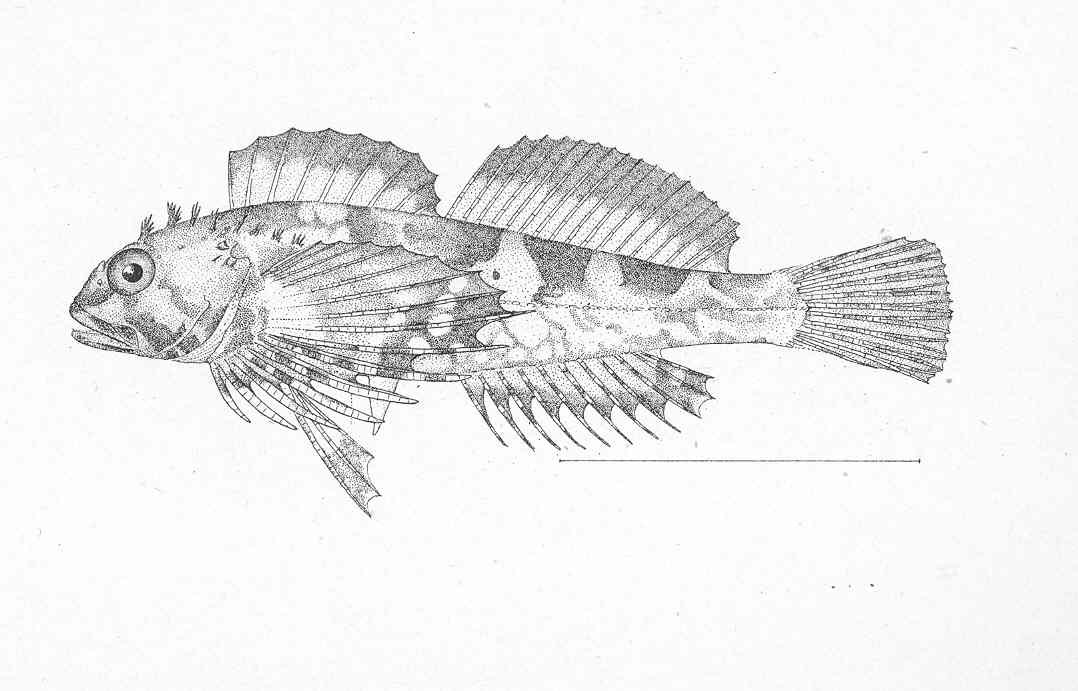

Scientific classification
- Kingdom: Animalia
- Phylum: Chordata
- Class: Actinopterygii
- Order: Perciformes
- Suborder: Cottoidei
- Family: Psychrolutidae
- Genus: Clinocottus
- Species: C. embryum

Binomial name
- Clinocottus embryum (Jordan & Starks, 1895)

Synonyms
- Oligocottus embryum Jordan & Starks, 1895; Blennicottus embryum (Jordan & Starks, 1895)

= Clinocottus embryum =

Species of fish

Clinocottus embryum, the calico sculpin or mossy sculpin, is a species of marine ray-finned fish belonging to the family Cottidae, the typical sculpins. It is found in the eastern Pacific Ocean.

== Taxonomy ==
Clinocottus embryum was first formally described as Oligocottus embryum in 1895 by the American ichthyologists David Starr Jordan and Edwin Chapin Starks with its type locality given as "Several miles east of Neah Bay, Washington". The calico sculpin is classified within the subgenus Blennicottus which was proposed by Theodore Gill in 1861 and is the clade of round headed species within the genus Clinocottus, these species seemingly not being the closest relatives of the two sharp snouted species. The specific name, embryum, means "in moss", an allusion Jordan and Starks did not explain but may be a reference to this species being found in tidal pools among algae.

== Description ==
Clinocottus embryum has between 8 and 10 spines and 14 and 17 soft rays supporting its dorsal fins and 9 to 12 soft rays in the anal fin. The caudal fin is rounded and the pelvic fins are small. This species has cirri on the head and lateral line only. There is a blunt spine on the preoperculum. The maximum published total length of this species is 7 cm (2.8 in).

== Distribution and habitat ==
Clinocottus embryum is found in the eastern Pacific along the western coast of North America from the Bering Sea coast in Alaska to northern Baja California. This demersal species is found in rocky areas in the middle of the intertidal zone.

== Biology ==
Clinocottus embryer has the ability to breathe air. The most important prey of the calico sculpin is barnacle tentacles, with the remainder of the prey consisting of crustaceans such as amphipods, gammarids and isopods, and insect larvae. This species has been found to be the host of the digenean endoparasites Lecithaster salmonis and Derogenes varicus.
