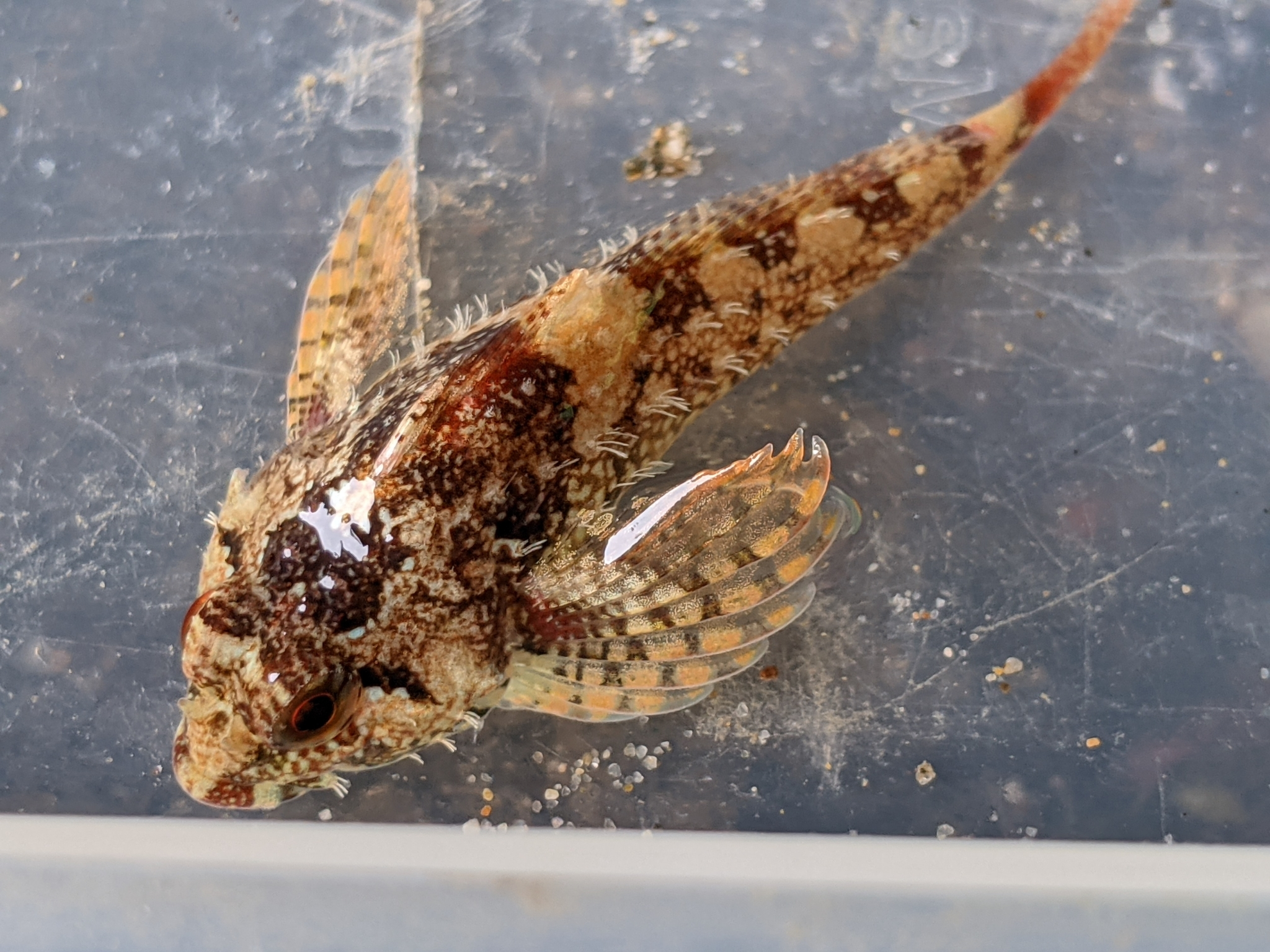

Scientific classification
- Kingdom: Animalia
- Phylum: Chordata
- Class: Actinopterygii
- Order: Perciformes
- Suborder: Cottoidei
- Family: Psychrolutidae
- Genus: Oligocottus
- Species: O. rubellio

Binomial name
- Oligocottus rubellio (Greeley, 1899)

Synonyms
- Eximia rubellio Greeley, 1899

= Rosy sculpin =

Species of fish

The rosy sculpin (Oligocottus rubellio) is a species of marine ray-finned fish belonging to the family Cottidae, the typical sculpins. It inhabits the coastal northeastern Pacific Ocean, ranging from California (US) to Baja California.

== Taxonomy ==
The rosy sculpin was first formally described in as Eximia rubeliio in 1899 by the A merican physiologist and ichthyologist Arthur White Greeley with its type locality given as Monterey, California. The specific name, rubellio, means "the rosy one", an allusion to the pale red or pink color it can show.

== Description ==
The rosy sculpin has a smooth body, lacking scales or prickles. The nasal spine has a cirrus and up to 4 more cirri on the rear of the jaw. There are tufts, made up of cirri, along the dorsal fin base, the lateral line and on the head. The topmost spine on the preoperculum has between 2 and 4 points, 3 is typical. The dorsal fin contains between 7 and 9 spines and between 13 and 17 soft rays while the anal fin is supported by between 10 and 14 soft rays. The caudal fin is rounded. This species has a maximum published total length of 10 cm (3.9 in). It is reddish brown to pink or lavender on the upper body and greenish to brown on the lower body. There are dark saddle-like blotches along the back, pale spots along the flank and dark bars radiate from the eyes.

== Distribution and habitat ==
The rosy sculpin is found in the eastern Pacific Ocean where it is found from Fort Bragg, California south to Punta Baja, near El Rosario, Baja California. This species is found in rocky habitats in the intertidal and sub tidal zones down to 34 m (112 ft).

== Biology ==
The rosy sculpin eats polychaetes and amphipods, the larger fish also prey on shrimp and small crabs.
