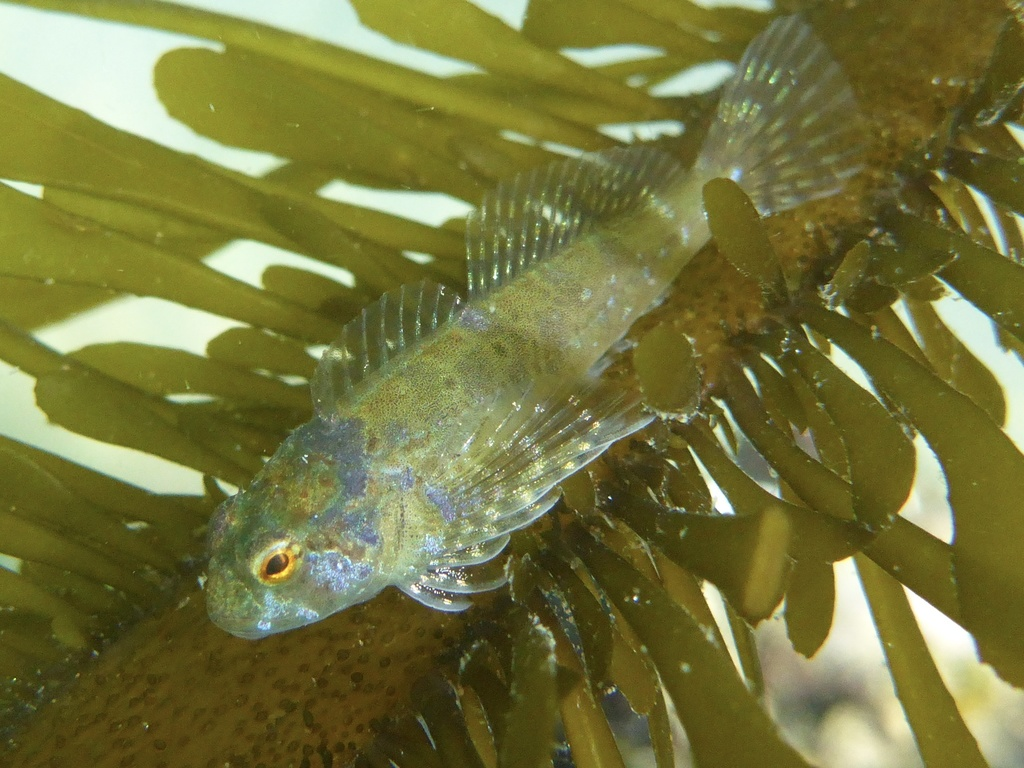
- Breakwater Cove Marina, Monterey, California

Scientific classification
- Kingdom: Animalia
- Phylum: Chordata
- Class: Actinopterygii
- Order: Perciformes
- Suborder: Cottoidei
- Family: Psychrolutidae
- Genus: Clinocottus
- Species: C. recalvus

Binomial name
- Clinocottus recalvus (Greeley, 1899)

Synonyms
- Blennicottus recalvus Greeley, 1899

= Bald sculpin =

Species of fish

The bald sculpin (Clinocottus recalvus) is a species of marine ray-finned fish belonging to the family Cottidae, the typical sculpins. It is found in the eastern Pacific Ocean.

== Taxonomy ==
The bald sculpin was first formally described as Blennicottus recalvus in 1899 by the American ichthyologist Arthur White Greeley, with its type locality given as Pacific Grove, California. The bald sculpin is classified within the subgenus Blennicottus, which was proposed by Theodore Gill in 1861 and is the clade of round headed species within the genus Clinocottus, these species seemingly not being the closest relatives of the two sharp snouted species. The specific name, recalvus, means "bald in front", an allusion to the absence of cirri between the eyes and their sparseness on the crown.

== Description ==
The bald sculpin has a large, depressed, flattened, and broad head with an elongated, tapering body. The head and body have light to dark brown speckles with paler reddish and white mottles. The large eyes are positioned on the top of the head and the large wide mouth is equipped with many small teeth. The dorsal fins are supported by 8 or 9 spines and between 14 and 17 soft rays while the anal fin has between 10 and 13 soft rays. The pelvic fins each have a single spine and 3 rays. The maximum published total length for this species is 13 cm (5.1 in).

== Distribution and habitat ==
The bald sculpin is found in the eastern Pacific Ocean, along the eastern coast of North America from Brookings, Oregon to Baja California Sur. They are a common species of tidal pools and shallow rocky areas.

== Biology ==
The bald sculpin is a demersal fish. They are able to breathe air and can survive exposure for up to 90 minutes. In pools where oxygen levels are low, they may expose their heads for a few minutes before submerging for a similar period. They are omnivores, eating algae as well as being ambush predators of small crustaceans and molluscs. They are an oviparous species with internal fertilization, spawning in batches, with each female spawning a number of batches of eggs in a year. The eggs are placed in crevices and on rocks, with their color varying with the environment and possibly by the food consumed by the mother.
