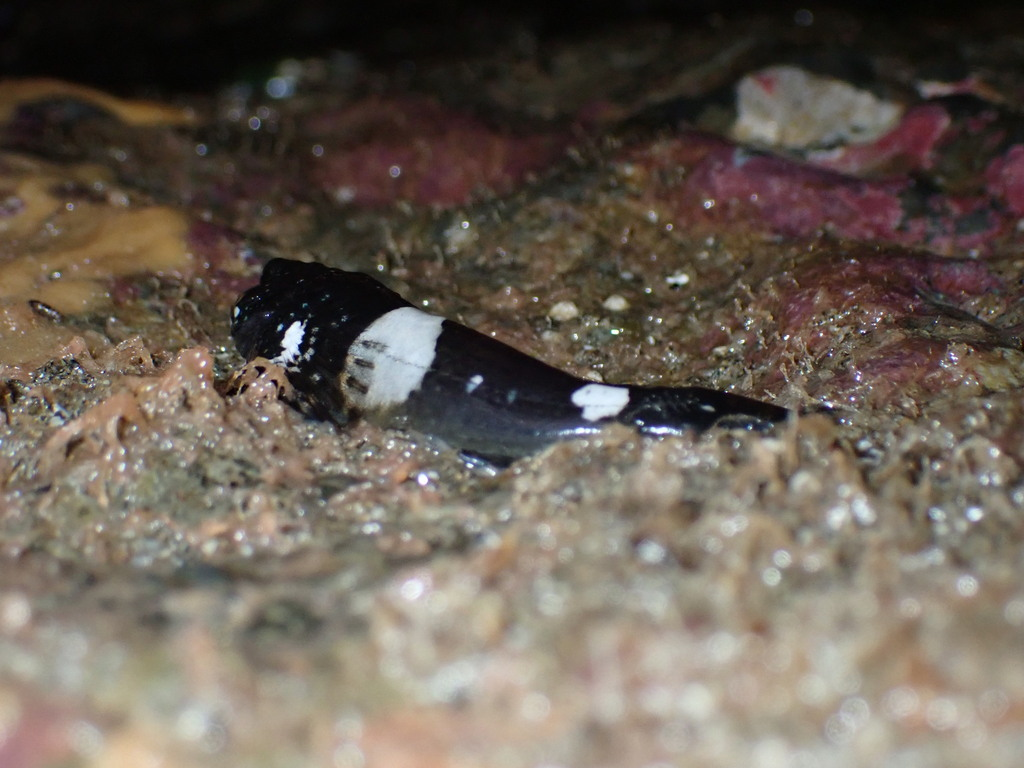

Conservation status
- Least Concern (IUCN 3.1)

Scientific classification
- Kingdom: Animalia
- Phylum: Chordata
- Class: Actinopterygii
- Order: Perciformes
- Suborder: Cottoidei
- Family: Psychrolutidae
- Genus: Clinocottus
- Species: C. globiceps

Binomial name
- Clinocottus globiceps (Girard, 1858)

Synonyms
- Blennicottus globiceps (Girard, 1858); Oligocottus globiceps Girard, 1858

= Clinocottus globiceps =

Species of fish

Clinocottus globiceps, the mosshead sculpin or globe-headed sculpin, is a species of marine ray-finned fish belonging to the family Cottidae, the typical sculpins. This sculpin is found in the northeastern Pacific.

== Taxonomy ==
Clinocottus globiceps was first formally described as Oligocottus globiceps in 1858 by the French ichthyologist Charles Frédéric Girard with its type locality given as Southern Farallones Island, off San Francisco in California. This species is classified within the subgenus Blennicottus, of which it is the type species, which was proposed by Theodore Gill in 1861 and is the clade of round headed species within the genus Clinocottus, these species seemingly not being the closest relatives of the two sharp snouted species. The specific name, globiceps, means "spherical head", an allusion its rounded head profile.

== Description ==
Clinocottus globiceps has 9 or 10 spines and between 15 and 17 soft rays supporting its dorsal fins and 10 to 12 soft rays in the anal fin. The caudal fin is rounded while the pectoral fins have their 8 lower fin rays thickened with 7 of these being excised. This species has a dense covering cirri on the head, especially between the eyes, and lateral line. There is a single blunt upper spine on the preoperculum. The maximum published total length of this species is 19 cm (7.5 in).

== Distribution and habitat ==
Clinocottus globiceps is found in the eastern Pacific Ocean where it is found of the western coast of North America between Kodiak Island, Alaska to Gaviota, California. This is an intertidal species living in tidal pools and shallow rocky areas, frequently where there is strong surf, this species is resident and is known show homing behavior.

== Biology ==
Clinocottus globiceps has the ability to breathe air and may leave a rock pool if the conditions in the water there become unsuitable. Often seen out of water on rocks but is more typically hiding under rocks or in seaweed. These fishes have a diverse diet including barnacles, copepods, nemerteans, annelids and ostracods, as well as algae. They are also known to be predators of the anenomes Anthopleura elegantissima and Epiactis prolifera which is thought to be a reason for some of their morphological and behavioral adaptations.
