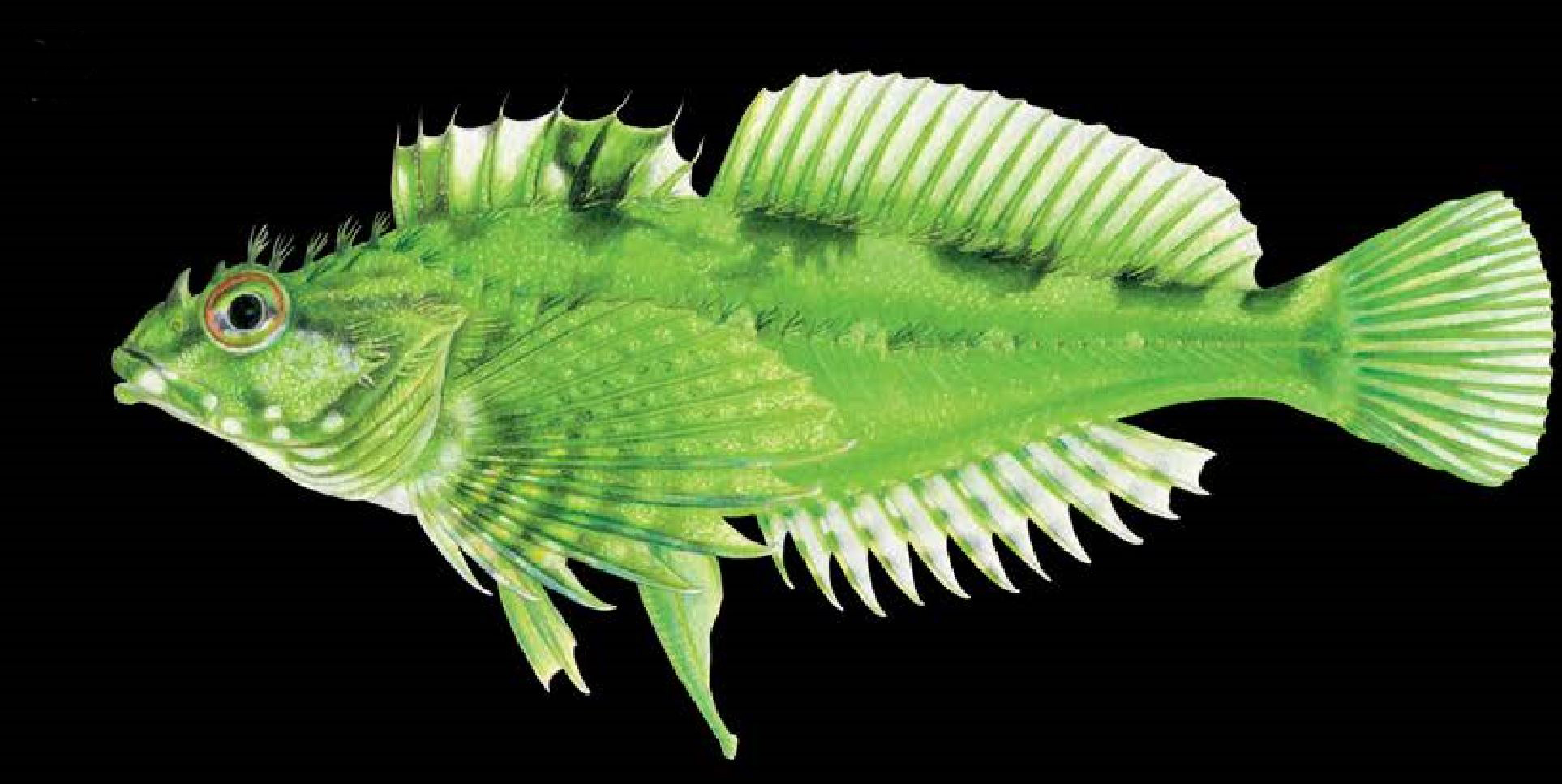

Scientific classification
- Kingdom: Animalia
- Phylum: Chordata
- Class: Actinopterygii
- Division: Teleostei
- Order: Perciformes
- Suborder: Cottoidei
- Family: Psychrolutidae
- Genus: Oligocottus
- Species: O. snyderi

Binomial name
- Oligocottus snyderi Greeley, 1898

= Fluffy sculpin =

Species of fish

The fluffy sculpin (Oligocottus snyderi) or Lizard Fish is a fish species in the sculpin family Cottidae. It inhabits the coastal northwestern Pacific Ocean, ranging from Kodiak, Alaska to Baja California (Mexico). Individuals reach up to 9 cm (3.5 in) in length, and are commonly found in tidepools, often associated with algae.

== Description ==
The fluffy sculpin grows to a length of about 9 cm (3.5 in). The dorsal fin has 7 to 9 spines and 17 to 20 soft rays, and the anal fin has no spines but 12 to 15 soft rays. In the male, the first anal ray is enlarged and the first three rays are separated from the others. The body is smooth and lacks scales. There is a short spine on the snout with a cirrus beside it, and tufts of cirri on the top of the head, along the lateral line and at the base of the dorsal fin. The colour of this fish is variable, being anything from green to pink or reddish-brown.

== Distribution and habitat ==
The fluffy sculpin is native to the western coast of North America, its range extending from Kodiak, Alaska to Baja California. It is found on rocky coasts, being present from the mid littoral zone to the shallow subtidal zone. When the tide is out, it occupies rock pools on the lower shore. When the tide comes in, it forages over a wider area.

The fluffy sculpin occupies much the same range as the tidepool sculpin (Oligocottus maculosus) but the two do not seem to be in direct competition for resources as the fluffy sculpin chooses pools further down the beach where the water remains cooler. Both species can return to their home pool if displaced to a nearby locality outside their immediate home range.

== Ecology ==
The fluffy sculpin is a predator, the diet consisting mainly of amphipods and polychaete worms. Larger individuals also feed on small shrimps and crabs. Spawning takes place in winter and spring. The male's first anal ray is prehensile and is used as a clasper to hold onto the female. Fertilisation is internal, with clusters of eggs being laid on rocks and guarded by the male. The larvae are planktonic in the open sea and metamorphosis into juvenile fish probably occurs at times when the upwelling of nutrient-rich water occurs along this coastline.

If conditions deteriorate in the pool inhabited by the fluffy sculpin when the tide is out, it is able to leave the water and breathe air. It is less tolerant of adverse conditions than the tidepool sculpin.
