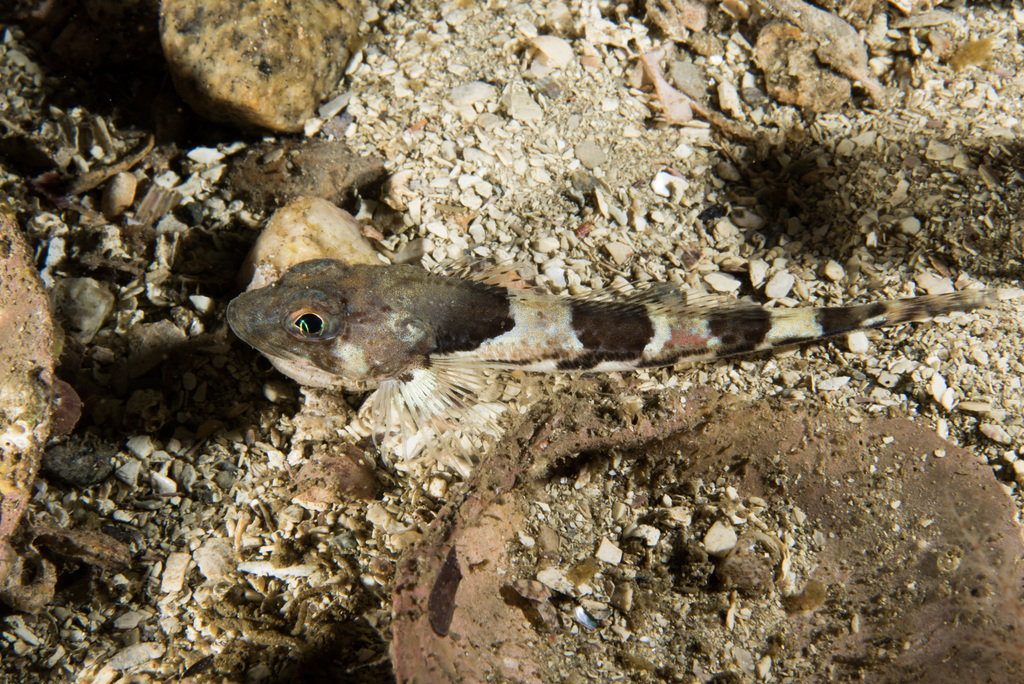

Scientific classification
- Kingdom: Animalia
- Phylum: Chordata
- Class: Actinopterygii
- Order: Perciformes
- Suborder: Cottoidei
- Family: Psychrolutidae
- Genus: Triglops
- Species: T. murrayi

Binomial name
- Triglops murrayi Günther, 1888

Synonyms
- Triglops pingelii murrayi Günther, 1888; Triglops ommatistius Gilbert, 1913; Triglops murrayi ommatistius Gilbert, 1913; Triglops ommatistius ommatistius Gilbert, 1913; Triglops ommatistius terraenovae Gilbert, 1913; Triglops murrayi terraenovae Gilbert, 1913; Triglops pingelii terraenovae Gilbert, 1913; Triglops pingelii var. subborealis Le Danois, 1914; Triglops pingelii islandicus Jensen (da), 1944; Triglops pingelii pietschmanni Jensen, 1944

= Triglops murrayi =

Species of fish

Triglops murrayi, the moustache sculpin, is a species of marine ray-finned fish belonging to the family Cottidae, the typical sculpins. This fish is found in the North Atlantic Ocean.

== Taxonomy ==
Triglops murrayi was first formally described as Triglops pingelii murrayi in 1888 by the German-born British zoologist Albert Günther with its type locality given as the Mull of Kintyre, Scotland. The moustach sculpin was treated as a subspecies of the ribbed sculpin (T. pingelii) until Anatoly Andriyashev redescribed it as a valid species in 1949. The specific name honours the pioneering Scottish oceanographer John Murray who collected the type.

== Description ==
Triglops murrayi is brown on the back and pale brown to cream on the lower body with four blackish-brown saddle-like blotches on the back, these are rather vague in some male fishes. They have a series of dak brown blotches underneath the lateral line that connect to create streaks. The males normally have a clear black blotch on the rear of the first dorsal fin. The base of the caudal fin has dark spots both dorsally and ventrally and the rays of the fin are crossed by between 3 and 6 thin bands, those of males may be hidden by the overall dark coloration of the fin. The upper jaw protrudes slightly. The caudal fin may be truncate or slightly rounded. The third ray of the pelvic fin is longest in females while the second is the longest in males. The males have conical urogenital papilla. The males reach a maximum published standard length of 20 cm (7.9 in) while females reach 15.9 cm (6.3 in).

== Distribution and habitat ==
Triglops murrayi occurs in the North Atlantic and in the Atlantic sector of the Arctic Ocean. It has been recorded rom the coast of Hudson Bay, the southern end of Baffin Island and Ungava Bay, as far south as Cape Cod and east to Greenland, In the eastern Atlantic it is found along the north coast of Iceland south to the western and northern coasts of Scotland, Orkney, Faroe Islands to the southern extremity of Spitsbergen and Bear Island and along the Scandinavian coast as far north as the White Sea. This is a benthic fish, found on sandy substrates at depths between 7 and 530 m (23 and 1,739 ft), normally at depths from 100 to 200 m (330 to 660 ft).

== Biology ==
Triglops murrayi feeds on benthic polychaetes and crustaceans, as well as planktonic crustaceans. Spawning occurs in late autumn and winter and the urogenital papilla of the male function as an intromittent organ.
