= Lavender sculpin =

Scientific classification
- Kingdom: Animalia
- Phylum: Chordata
- Class: Actinopterygii
- Order: Perciformes
- Suborder: Cottoidei
- Superfamily: Cottoidea
- Family: Psychrolutidae
- Genus: Leiocottus; Girard, 1856
- Species: L. hirundo

Binomial name
- Leiocottus hirundo Girard, 1856

Species of fish

The lavender sculpin (Leiocottus hirundo) is a species of marine ray-finned fish belonging to the family Cottidae, the typical sculpins. It is found in the eastern Pacific Ocean.

== Taxonomy ==
The lavender sculpin was first formally described by the French ichthyologist Charles Frédéric Girard in 1556 with its type locality given as San Miguel Island near San Diego in California. Leiocottus hirundo is the only member of its genus. However, phylogenetically it falls within the diversity of the genus Clinocottus. It is a sister taxon to Clinocottus analis. The 5th edition of Fishes of the World classifies the genus Leiocottus within the subfamily Cottinae of the family Cottidae, however, other authors classify the genus within the subfamily Psychrolutinae of the family Psychrolutidae.

== Etymology ==
The lavender sculpin's genus name, Leiocottus, is a combination of leios meaning "smooth" with Cottus, the type genus of the family Cottidae. This is a reference to the smooth skin of this fish with no prickles or scales. The specific name hirundo is Latin for a swallow and is a reference to the similarity to Chelidonichthys lucerna Girard perceived in this species.

== Description ==
The lavender sculpin has dorsal fins which are supported by 9 or 10 spines and 16 or 17 soft rays while the anal fin has between 14 and 16 soft rays. The pelvic fins each have a single spine and 3 rays. The color is olive-green, brown, orange-brown or lavender with four saddle-like blotches along the back of the rear of the body and there are four brown bars on the lips. This species grows to a maximum published total length of 25 cm (9.8 in).

== Distribution and habitat ==
The lavender sculpin is found in the eastern Pacific Ocean from southern California, United States to northern Baja California, Mexico. It lives from inshore waters to a depth of around 37 metres (120 ft).
