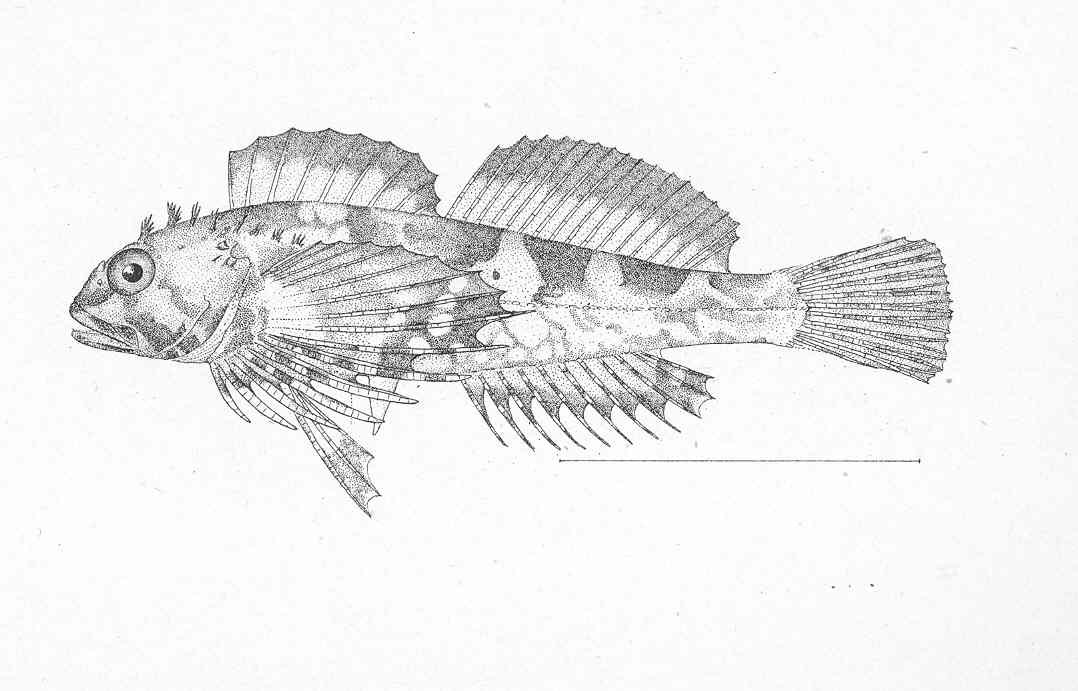
- Clinocottus embryum

Scientific classification
- Kingdom: Animalia
- Phylum: Chordata
- Class: Actinopterygii
- Order: Perciformes
- Suborder: Cottoidei
- Family: Psychrolutidae
- Genus: Clinocottus; Gill, 1861

Type species
- Oligocottus analis Girard, 1858

Synonyms
- Allocottus Hubbs, 1926; Blennicottus Gill, 1861; Montereya Hubbs, 1926; Oxycottus Jordan & Evermann, 1898; Rusulus Starks & Mann, 1911

= Clinocottus =

Genus of fishes

Clinocottus is a genus of marine ray-finned fishes belonging to the family Cottidae, the typical sculpins. They are nearshore benthic fishes native to the northeastern Pacific Ocean. They are mentioned as sharpnose sculpins.

== Taxonomy ==
Clinocottus was first proposed as a monospecific genus in 1861 by the American zoologist Theodore Gill with Oligocottus analis, which had been described in 1858 by Charles Frédéric Girard from Monterey, California, as its only species. Molecular data indicate that this genus is polyphyletic or paraphyletic, it does not constitute a natural assemblage within Cottidae. Workers have found that the lavender sculpin (Leiocottus hirundo) is the sister taxon to C. analis, a species which is not closely related to C. acuticeps. In turn, C. acuticeps is determined to be basal to Artedius, or to the clade referred to as Oligocottinae. The 5th edition of Fishes of the World classifies the genus Clinocottus within the subfamily Cottinae of the family Cottidae, however, other authors classify the genus within the subfamily Oligocottinae of the family Psychrolutidae.

== Etymology ==
Clinocottus combines Clinus a genus of blennies with Cottus, probably because Girard though the rounded head of the mosshead sculpin was reminiscent of the ehad shape of some gobies and blennies.

== Species ==
There are currently five recognized species in this genus:

- Clinocottus acuticeps (C. H. Gilbert, 1896) (Sharpnose sculpin)
- Clinocottus analis (Girard, 1858) (Woolly sculpin)
- Clinocottus embryum (D. S. Jordan & Starks, 1895) (Calico sculpin)
- Clinocottus globiceps (Girard, 1858) (Mosshead sculpin)
- Clinocottus recalvus (Greeley, 1899) (Bald sculpin)

== Characteristics ==
Clinocottus sculpins are characterised by having the anus in a forward position between the anal fin and the pelvic fins, they have a heavy and blunt penis and in both sexes the anal fin is unmodified. C. analis and C. acuticeps have pointed heads, which is regarded as a basal feature and the remaining 3 species have sizeable, rounded heads. This is suggestive of the paraphyly of the group. These are small sculpins, the largest species is the mosshead sculpin with a maximum published total length of 19 cm (7.5 in) and the smallest is the calico sculpin with a maximum published total length of 7 cm (2.8 in).

== Distribution ==
Clinocottus sculpins are found in the eastern Pacific Ocean where they are found in the intertidal zone.
