= BDS-1 =

Neurotoxin

Infobox
BDS-1

Identifiers
- Organism: Anemonia sulcata
- Synonym: Kappa-actitoxin-Avd4a
- PDB: 2BDS
- Uniprot: P11494

Blood-depressing substance-1 (BDS-1), also known as kappa-actitoxin-Avd4a, is a polypeptide found in the venom of the snakelocks anemone Anemonia sulcata. BDS-1 is a neurotoxin that modulates voltage-dependent potassium channels, in particular Kv3-family channels, as well as certain sodium channels. This polypeptide belongs to the sea anemone type 3 toxin peptide family.

== Etymology ==
BDS-1 brings about a decrease in blood pressure by blocking Kv3 potassium channels. Thus, this protein is named after its antihypertensive function.

== Sources ==
BDS-1 is a toxin secreted by the nematocyst of Anemonia sulcata (Mediterranean snakelocks sea anemone).

== Chemistry ==
BDS-1 is a 43 amino acids long polypeptide chain, which consists of six cysteines linked by three disulfide bridges. The secondary structure of BDS-1 possesses three-stranded antiparallel β-sheets, along with one more short antiparallel β-sheet at its N-terminus. When viewed along the polypeptide strand, its structure showa a right-handed twist.

BDS-1 shares structural homology with the toxin BDS-2, which belongs to the same type-3 peptide family. It also displays around 24–26% identity with toxins AsI (ATX-I), AsII (ATX-II), and AsV (ATX-V) from Anemonia sulcata and AxI (AP-A) from Anthopleura xanthogrammica.

== Target ==
BDS-1 is an inhibitor of the fast inactivating Kv3-family channels, including Kv3.1, Kv3.2 and Kv3.4 channels. Additionally, BDS-1 affects the inactivation of voltage-gated sodium channels, Nav1.1, Nav1.3, Nav1.6 and Nav1.7.

== Mode of action ==
BDS-1 modifies the voltage-dependent gating properties of Kv3 potassium channels by binding to the voltage sensitive domains on S3b and S4 subunits. The toxin elicits a depolarizing shift in the conductance-voltage relation, making it more difficult to open, and slows both the activation and inactivation kinetics of these ion channels.

In addition, BDS-1 enhances the current flowing through several voltage-gated sodium channels. The toxin binds to the S3-S4 linker of domain IV and slows the inactivation of the channel, resulting in increased current upon depolarization. BDS-1 has a very strong potency for the human Nav1.7 channel. In mice, BDS-1 slows the inactivation of Nav1.3 channels but has smaller effects on the inactivation of Nav1.1 and Nav1.6 channels. This is probably due to a different channel sensitivity for the toxin.

== Toxicity ==
By targeting Kv3.1a channels, BDS-1 concentrations at or above 3 μM are toxic to mouse fibroblasts.
