= Crassispira greeleyi =

Scientific classification
- Kingdom: Animalia
- Phylum: Mollusca
- Class: Gastropoda
- Subclass: Caenogastropoda
- Order: Neogastropoda
- Superfamily: Conoidea
- Family: Pseudomelatomidae
- Genus: Crassispira
- Species: C. greeleyi

Binomial name
- Crassispira greeleyi (W. H. Dall, 1901)

Synonyms
- Crassispira (Monilispira) greeleyi (Dall, 1901); Drillia greeleyi Dall, 1901

Species of gastropod

Crassispira greeleyi is a species of sea snail, a marine gastropod mollusk in the family Pseudomelatomidae.

== Description ==
The length of the shell attains 10.5 mm, its diameter 4.5 mm.

(Original description) The small, stout, solid shell is acute with eight or nine whorls. The protoconch is small, smooth, dark reddish purple with two whorls followed by a third with strong arcuate ribs concave anteriorly, and which at the end of the whorl are replaced by transverse nodules separated from the suture behind by a revolving ridge. The body whorl has twelve or thirteen narrow transverse ribs, extending forward from the anal fasciole. Behind the fasciole a stout ridge revolves a little in advance of the appressed edge of the whorl. The ridge is nodulous where it rides over the ribs of the preceding whorl . In front of the fasciole the ribs are crossed by two adjacent and four rather distant stout revolving threads, beside which there are four or five smaller threads on the siphonal canal, and in the interstices and on the fasciole extremely fine sharp revolving threads. All the large threads form nodules where they cross the ribs and these nodules are yellow. The shell elsewhere is dark reddish, nearly black. The body whorl is more than half the shell. The aperture is narrow and dark.

== Distribution ==
This marine species occurs off the mouth of Rio Goyanna, Brazil.
