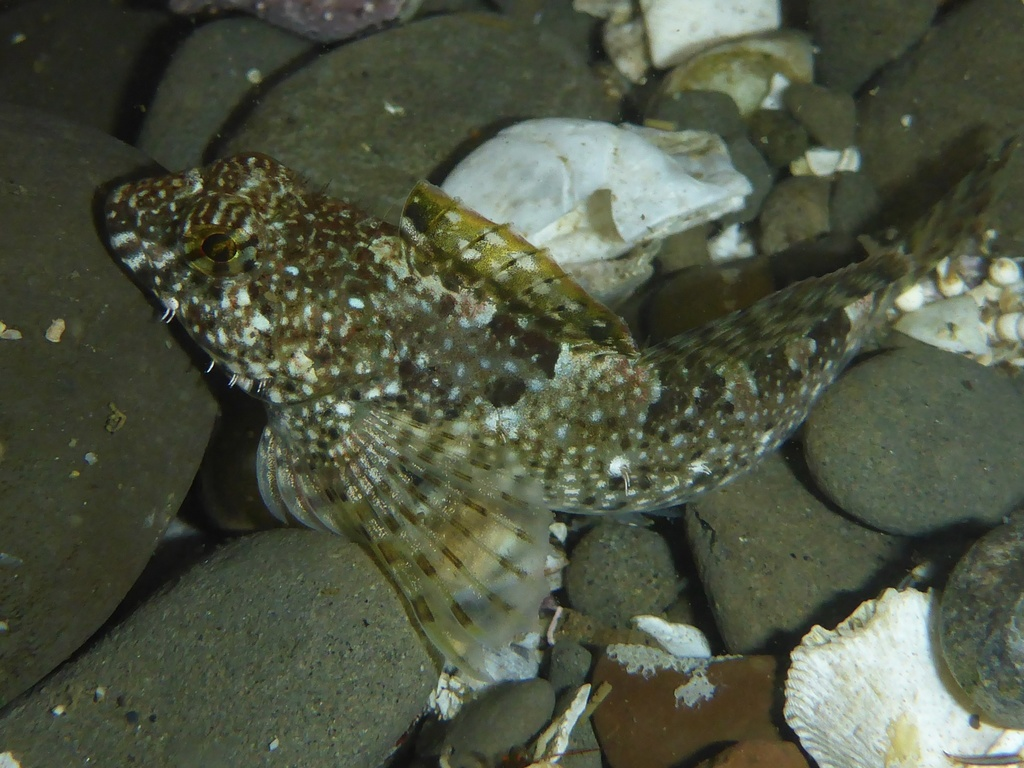
- Woolly sculpin (Clinocottus analis) Pillar Point Bluffs, Beach and Reef, California

Scientific classification
- Kingdom: Animalia
- Phylum: Chordata
- Class: Actinopterygii
- Order: Perciformes
- Suborder: Cottoidei
- Family: Psychrolutidae
- Genus: Clinocottus
- Species: C. analis

Binomial name
- Clinocottus analis (Girard, 1858)

Synonyms
- Oligocottus analis Girard, 1858

= Woolly sculpin =

Species of fish

The woolly sculpin (Clinocottus analis) is a species of ray-finned marine fish belonging to the family Cottidae, or the typical sculpins. It is found in the eastern Pacific Ocean, where it occurs along the coastline of California south to Baja California.

== Taxonomy ==
Clinocottus analis was first, formally, described as Oligocottus analis in 1858 by the French ichthyologist Charles Frédéric Girard, its type locality being given as Monterey, California. The genus Clinocottus has been resolved as paraphyletic or polyphyletic by some, believing this species to not be closely related to the others included in the same genus. This species is the only species subgenus Clinocottus which was proposed as a genus by Theodore Gill in 1861. The specific name, analis, refers to the anus, an allusion Girard did not explain, although he did describe this species as having the origin of the anal fin placed behind forward edge of the second dorsal fin. In 1898 it was suggested by David Starr Jordan and Barton Warren Evermann that the name referred to the "large anal papilla", but Girard did not mention this.

== Description ==
This fish reaches up to 18 centimeters in length. Their characteristic elongated and speckled body ends with a large wide and flattened head. Their eyes are found on the top of their head perpendicular to their large mouth aligned with many teeth. They are scaleless, instead, they have gills covering their large spine ending in a pair of sharp spines. They have dorsal, anal and caudal fins, each with 12 to 15 rays. The caudal fin is rounded and darker than the rest of their body.

== Ecology and metabolism ==
This species lives on the seabed of intertidal waters up to 18 meters deep. It is commonly found in tide pools amidst algaes, but it leaves the tide pool area at will. It can breathe air and has been known to survive out of water for up to 24 hours.

== Habitat ==
They are commonly found near the sand, small rocks and bedrock, specially in intertidal areas at near 19 m. They are found in water temperature ranges between 6 °C and 22 °C. They are able to survive rapid temperature fluctuations and rapid changes in salinity.

== Predators ==
In the United States it is preyed upon by the great blue heron (Ardea herodias), snowy egret (Egretta thula) and the willet (Tringa semipalmata).

== Feeding ==
The diet of this species includes mainly crustaceans, especially amphipods, as well as fish eggs and larvae, polychaetes, and molluscs. Most of its food items are light-colored or clear, suggesting that these are easiest for the fish to see against the dark background of its habitat.

== Reproduction ==
Their reproduction is oviparous with internal fertilization and spawning occurs in shallow coastal waters. Each female lays several batches of 50 to 1,300 eggs multiple times per year. These have a size ranging between 12 and 25 mm, settling the larvae in the tide-pools. In a few months, they mature to a length of 50–60 mm in total.

== Behavior ==
They are non-migratory species. They can camouflage themselves due to their subtle changes in body color. Their mottled specks are green, greenish-black, greenish-brown and reddish covering their body as well as their fins. The fins are also colored according to their body color patterned with light thin bands.

== Supplementary information ==
Biliverdin chemical molecule

They are harmless to humans.

The population dynamics of Clinocottus analis is highly seasonal. In general, growth and fertility peak from early spring to summer. However, survival is not seasonal.

This fish has green blood plasma, the color caused by biliverdin tightly bound in protein complexes.
