= Urchin clingfish =

Urchin clingfish may refer one of two species of gobiesocid fishes:

- Dellichthys morelandi, New Zealand urchin clingfish
- Diademichthys lineatus, urchin clingfish
