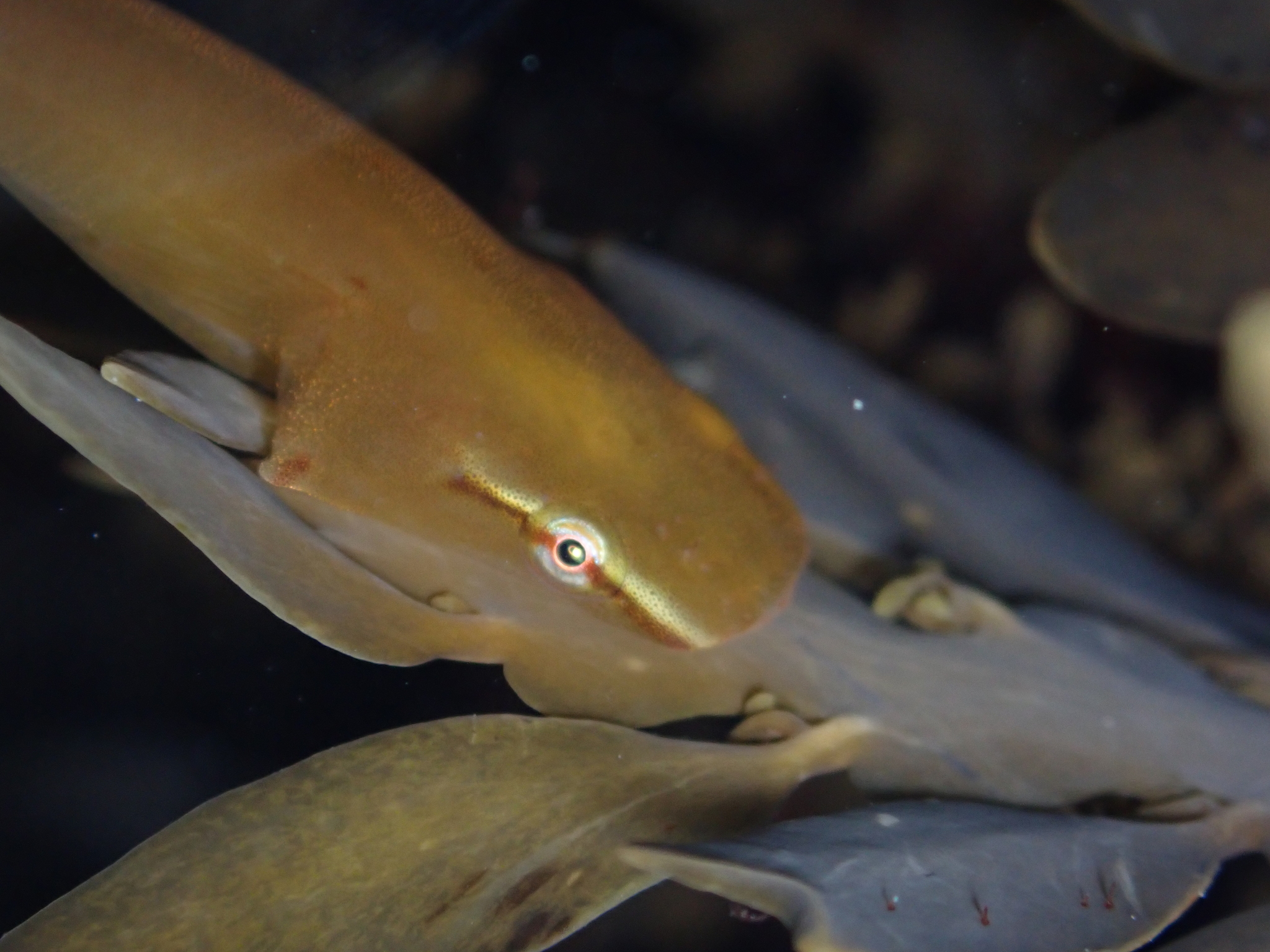

Scientific classification
- Kingdom: Animalia
- Phylum: Chordata
- Class: Actinopterygii
- Division: Teleostei
- Order: Blenniiformes
- Family: Gobiesocidae
- Subfamily: Gobiesocinae
- Genus: Haplocylix; Briggs, 1955
- Species: H. littoreus

Binomial name
- Haplocylix littoreus (J. R. Forster, 1801)

Synonyms
- Cyclopterus littoreus Forster, 1801

= Giant clingfish =

Species of fish

The giant clingfish (Haplocylix littoreus) is a clingfish of the family Gobiesocidae, the only species in the genus Haplocylix. It is found all down the east coast of New Zealand around the low water mark amongst seaweed, on rocky coastlines. Its length is up to 15 centimetres (5.9 in). This species was originally described as Cyclopterus littoreus in 1801 by Johann Reinhold Forster, John C. Briggs subsequently placed it in the monotypic genus Haplocylix. Its closest relative appears to be the Caribbean deepwater clingfish Gymnoscyphus ascitus.
