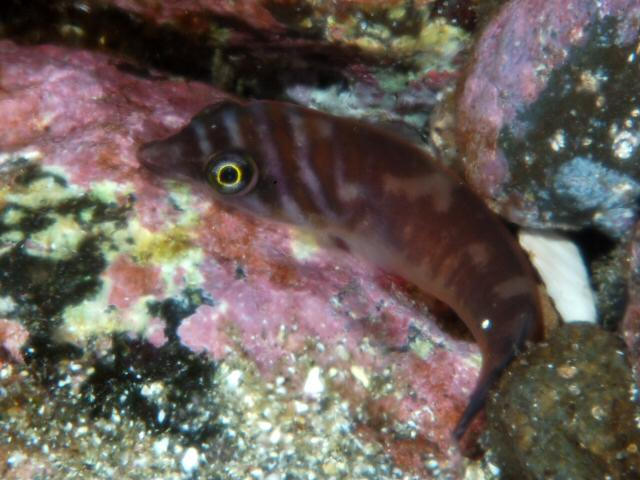
- Aspasmichthys ciconiae

Scientific classification
- Kingdom: Animalia
- Phylum: Chordata
- Class: Actinopterygii
- Order: Blenniiformes
- Family: Gobiesocidae
- Subfamily: Diademichthyinae
- Genus: Aspasmichthys; Briggs, 1955

Type species
- Aspasma ciconiae Jordan & Fowler, 1902

= Aspasmichthys =

Genus of fishes

Aspasmichthys is a genus of clingfishes from the western Pacific Ocean.

== Species ==
There are currently two recognized species in this genus:

- Aspasmichthys alorensis G. R. Allen & Erdmann, 2012
- Aspasmichthys ciconiae (D. S. Jordan & Fowler, 1902)
