= Propherallodus briggsi =

Conservation status
- Least Concern (IUCN 3.1)

Scientific classification
- Kingdom: Animalia
- Phylum: Chordata
- Class: Actinopterygii
- Order: Blenniiformes
- Family: Gobiesocidae
- Subfamily: Diademichthyinae
- Genus: Propherallodus
- Species: P. briggsi

Binomial name
- Propherallodus briggsi Shiogaki & Dotsu, 1983

Species of fish

Propherallodus briggsi is a species of clingfish native to the coasts of Japan. This species grows to a length of 3 centimetres (1.2 in) SL. This species is a member of the genus Propherallodus, as described by Masaru Shiogaki and Yoshie Dotsu in 1983 with a type locality of Meshima Island, Japan. Its specific name honours the American ichthyologist John "Jack" C. Briggs (1920–2018).

== See also ==
- Fujiwara, K.; H. Motomura (2019). "A new species, Propherallodus longipterus, from the Philippines and redescription of P. briggsi Shiogaki and Dotsu 1983 (Gobiesocidae: Diplocrepinae)". Ichthyological Research. 66 (1): 35–48. doi:10.1007/s10228-018-0645-4.
