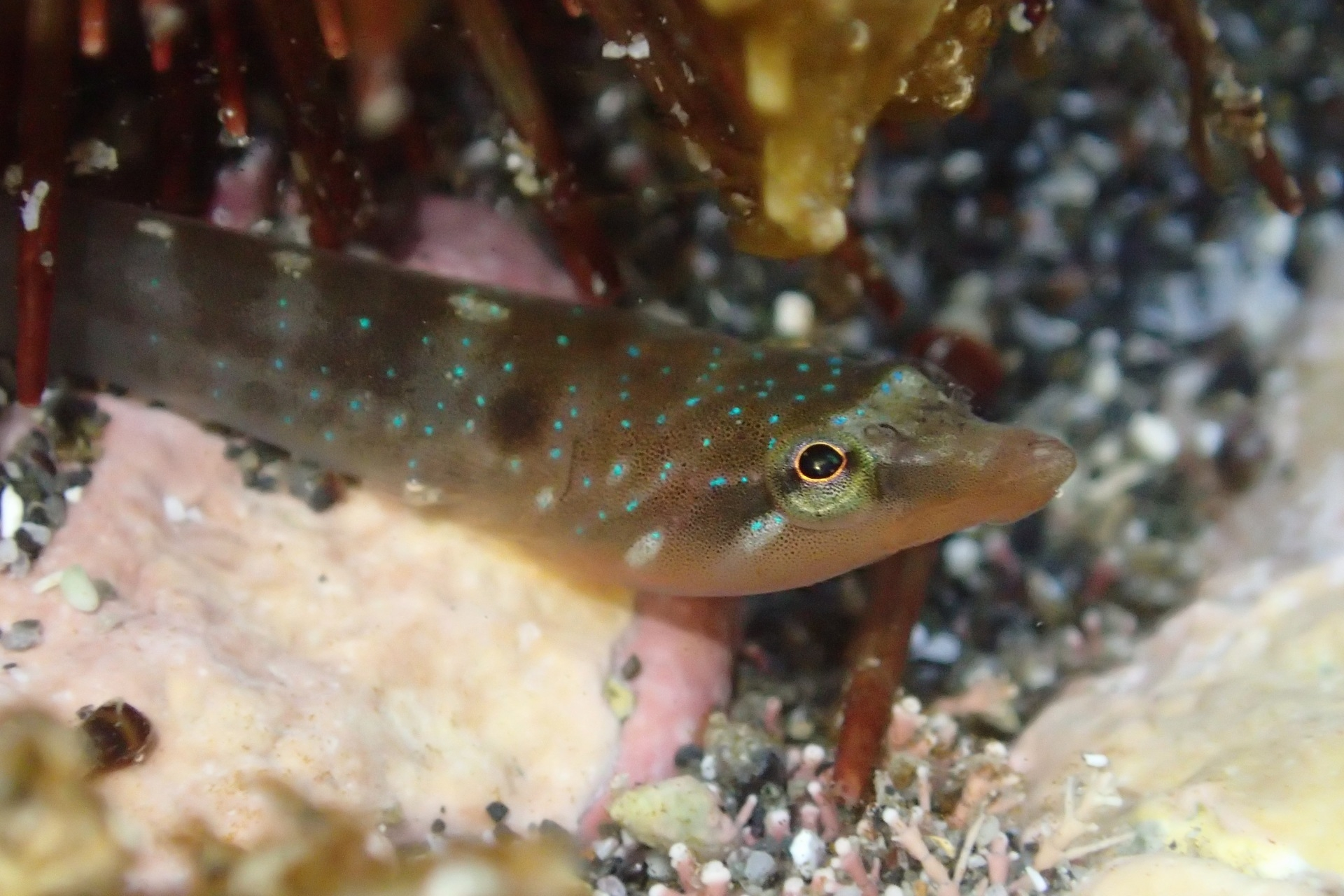

Scientific classification
- Domain: Eukaryota
- Kingdom: Animalia
- Phylum: Chordata
- Class: Actinopterygii
- Order: Blenniiformes
- Family: Gobiesocidae
- Genus: Dellichthys
- Species: D. morelandi

Binomial name
- Dellichthys morelandi Briggs, 1955

= New Zealand urchin clingfish =

Species of fish

The New Zealand urchin clingfish (Dellichthys morelandi) is a clingfish. It is found around New Zealand wherever sea urchins are present. Its length is between 2 and 3 cm.

This species was described by John C. Briggs in 1955 and was thought to be the sole species in the monotypic genus Dellichthys until 2018 when a new species, Dellichthys trnskii, was described after being discovered from intertidal and shallow coastal waters of New Zealand in that year. Briggs gave the species its specific name in honour of John Munne Moreland (1921-2012) of the Dominion Museum in Wellington.
