= Lecanogaster chrysea =

Conservation status
- Least Concern (IUCN 3.1)

Scientific classification
- Kingdom: Animalia
- Phylum: Chordata
- Class: Actinopterygii
- Order: Blenniiformes
- Family: Gobiesocidae
- Genus: Lecanogaster
- Species: L. chrysea

Binomial name
- Lecanogaster chrysea Briggs, 1957

Species of fish

Lecanogaster chrysea is a species of clingfish only known from the Atlantic Ocean off of Ghana. This species grows to a length of 2.1 centimetres (0.83 in) SL.
