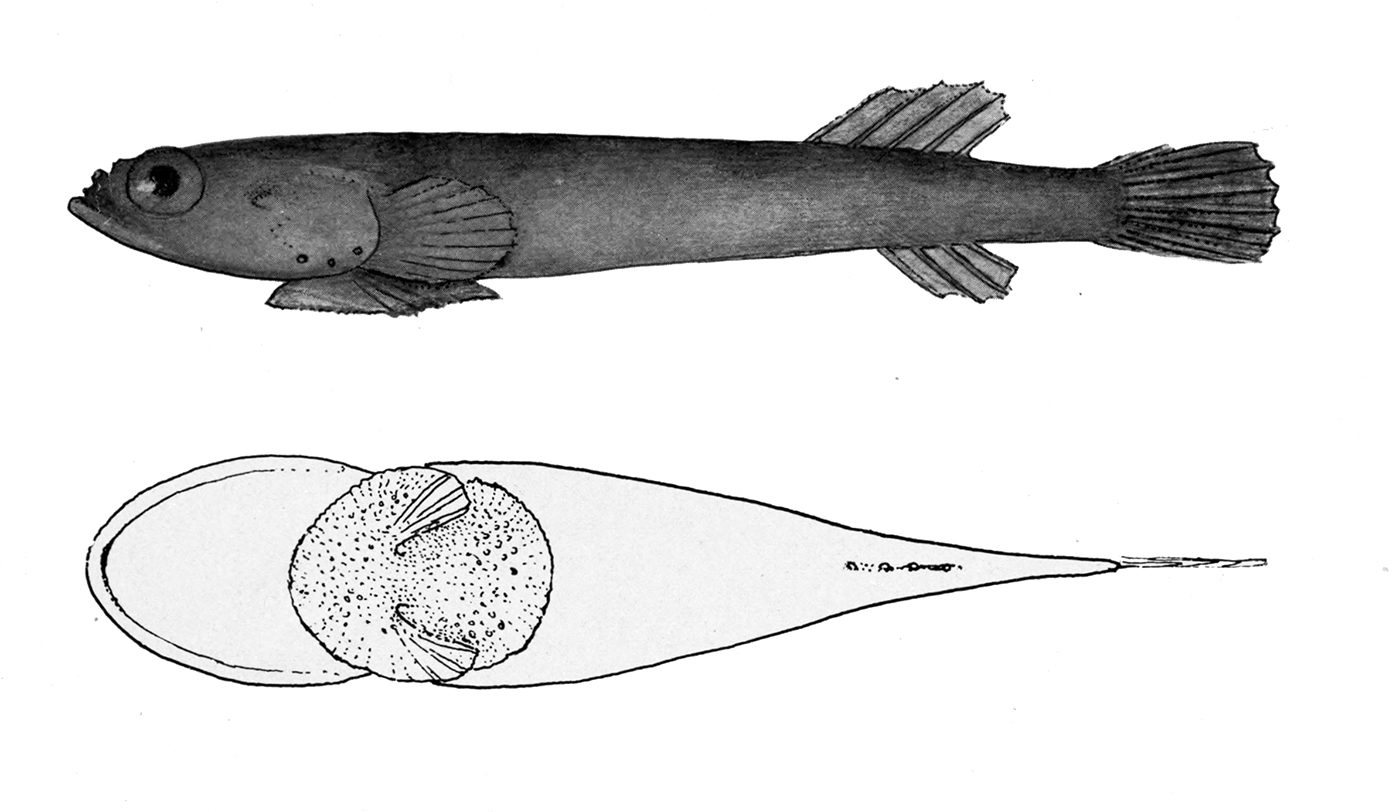

Scientific classification
- Kingdom: Animalia
- Phylum: Chordata
- Class: Actinopterygii
- Order: Blenniiformes
- Family: Gobiesocidae
- Subfamily: Gobiesocinae
- Genus: Tomicodon; Brisout de Barneville, 1846

Type species
- Tomicodon chilensis Brisout de Barneville, 1846

= Tomicodon =

Genus of fishes

Tomicodon is a genus of clingfishes native to the Western Hemisphere, with these currently recognized species:

- Tomicodon absitus Briggs, 1955 (distant clingfish)
- Tomicodon abuelorum Szelitowski, 1990
- Tomicodon australis Briggs, 1955
- Tomicodon bidens Briggs, 1969 (bifid clingfish)
- Tomicodon boehlkei Briggs, 1955 (Cortez clingfish)
- Tomicodon briggsi J. T. Williams & J. C. Tyler, 2003
- Tomicodon chilensis Brisout de Barneville, 1846 (smallsucker clingfish)
- Tomicodon clarkei J. T. Williams & J. C. Tyler, 2003
- Tomicodon cryptus J. T. Williams & J. C. Tyler, 2003
- Tomicodon eos (D. S. Jordan & C. H. Gilbert, 1882) (Rosy clingfish)
- Tomicodon fasciatus (W. K. H. Peters, 1859) (Barred clingfish)
- Tomicodon humeralis (C. H. Gilbert, 1890) (Sonora clingfish)
- Tomicodon lavettsmithi J. T. Williams & J. C. Tyler, 2003
- Tomicodon leurodiscus J. T. Williams & J. C. Tyler, 2003
- Tomicodon myersi Briggs, 1955 (blackstripe clingfish)
- Tomicodon petersii (Garman, 1875) (Peter's clingfish)
- Tomicodon prodomus Briggs, 1969
- Tomicodon reitzae Briggs, 2001
- Tomicodon rhabdotus Smith-Vaniz, 1969
- Tomicodon rupestris (Poey, 1860)
- Tomicodon vermiculatus Briggs, 1955
- Tomicodon zebra (D. S. Jordan & C. H. Gilbert, 1882) (zebra clingfish)
