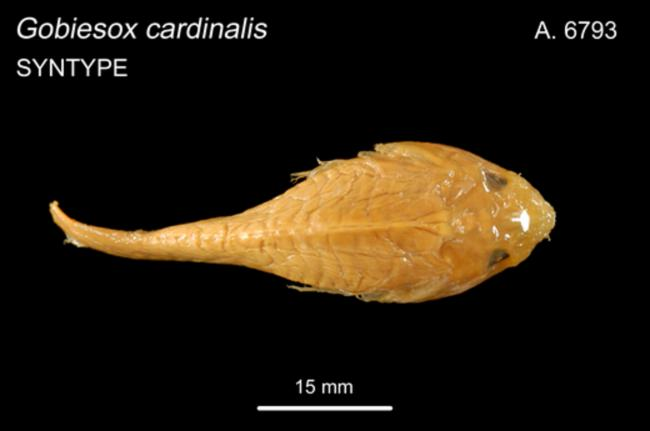

Scientific classification
- Domain: Eukaryota
- Kingdom: Animalia
- Phylum: Chordata
- Class: Actinopterygii
- Order: Blenniiformes
- Family: Gobiesocidae
- Genus: Creocele; Briggs, 1955
- Species: C. cardinalis

Binomial name
- Creocele cardinalis (E. P. Ramsay, 1882)

= Creocele =

Creocele cardinalis

Species of fish

Creocele is a genus of fishes in the clingfish family Gobiesocidae. It is monotypic, being represented by the single species Creocele cardinalis, commonly known as the broad clingfish, which is found on the southern coast of Australia.

== Description ==
This species grows to a length of 7.5 centimetres (3.0 in) TL. The colour is generally greenish with markings of darker brown. The head has a distinctly flattened appearance.
