= Black crinoid clingfish =

Scientific classification
- Kingdom: Animalia
- Phylum: Chordata
- Class: Actinopterygii
- Division: Teleostei
- Order: Blenniiformes
- Family: Gobiesocidae
- Genus: Discotrema
- Species: D. nigrum

Binomial name
- Discotrema nigrum (R. Fricke, 2014)

Synonyms
- Unguitrema nigrum Fricke, 2014

Species of fish

Discotrema nigrum, also known as the Black crinoid clingfish, is a species of clingfish endemic to Papua New Guinea. This species occurs Madang Lagoon in Madang District, Madang Province, Papua New Guinea. This species was the only known member of Unguitrema. It was collected from a crinoid, Oxycomanthus bennetti, of the black phase.
