= Propherallodus =

Scientific classification
- Kingdom: Animalia
- Phylum: Chordata
- Class: Actinopterygii
- Order: Blenniiformes
- Family: Gobiesocidae
- Subfamily: Diademichthyinae
- Genus: Propherallodus; Shiogaki & Dotsu, 1983

Genus of fish

Propherallodus is a genus of clingfishes in the subfamily Diademichthyinae.

There are currently three valid species:

- Propherallodus briggsi Shiogaki & Dotsu, 1983
- Propherallodus longipterus Fujiwara & Motomura, 2018
- Propherallodus smithi Briggs, 1955 (Mini-clingfish)
