= Lecanogaster =

Scientific classification
- Kingdom: Animalia
- Phylum: Chordata
- Class: Actinopterygii
- Order: Blenniiformes
- Family: Gobiesocidae
- Subfamily: Gobiesocinae
- Genus: Lecanogaster; Briggs, 1957

Type species
- Lecanogaster chrysea Briggs, 1957

Genus of fishes

Lecanogaster is a genus of clingfishes from the family Gobiesocidae. They are found in the Atlantic Ocean off the coast of west Africa. The genus was designated as a monotypic genus in 1957 by John C. Briggs but in 2017 a second species was assigned to the genus.

== Species ==
- Lecanogaster chrysea Briggs, 1957
- Lecanogaster gorgoniphila Fricke & Wirtz, 2017
