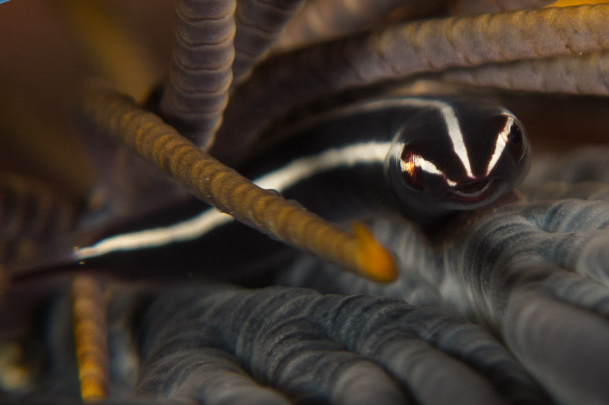
- Discotrema crinophilum

Scientific classification
- Kingdom: Animalia
- Phylum: Chordata
- Class: Actinopterygii
- Order: Blenniiformes
- Family: Gobiesocidae
- Subfamily: Diademichthyinae
- Genus: Discotrema; Briggs, 1976

Type species
- Discotrema crinophila Briggs, 1976

Synonyms
- Unguitrema Fricke, 2014

= Discotrema =

Genus of fishes

Discotrema is a genus of clingfishes found on reefs in the Indo-Pacific where they live on crinoids. These tiny fish have distinctive pattern consisting of long white or yellow lines along their body, except D. nigrum which has no stripes.

== Species ==
There are currently four recognized species in this genus:

- Discotrema crinophilum Briggs, 1976 (Crinoid clingfish)
- Discotrema monogrammum Craig & J. E. Randall, 2008 (Oneline clingfish)
- Discotrema nigrum (Fricke, 2014) (Black crinoid clingfish)
- Discotrema zonatum Craig & J. E. Randall, 2008
