= Mendeleev's clingfish =

Scientific classification
- Kingdom: Animalia
- Phylum: Chordata
- Class: Actinopterygii
- Order: Blenniiformes
- Family: Gobiesocidae
- Subfamily: Diademichthyinae
- Genus: Lepadicyathus
- Species: L. minor

Binomial name
- Lepadicyathus minor Briggs, 1955

Synonyms
- Lepadicyathus mendeleevi Prokofiev, 2005

Species of fish

Mendeleev's clingfish (Lepadicyathus minor) is a species of fish in the family Gobiesocidae endemic to Madang Province in Papua New Guinea. This species is the only known member of its genus. This species was described in 2005 by Artem Mikhailovich Prokofiev, the type being collected near the village of Bongu in Madang Province from the research vessel Dmitrii Mendeleev, referred to in its specific name. The vessel was in turn named in hours of the Russian chemist Dmitrii Mendeleev (1834-1907), the creator of the most widely recognised periodic table.
