= Aspasmodes =

Conservation status
- Least Concern (IUCN 3.1)

Scientific classification
- Kingdom: Animalia
- Phylum: Chordata
- Class: Actinopterygii
- Order: Blenniiformes
- Family: Gobiesocidae
- Genus: Aspasmodes; J. L. B. Smith, 1957
- Species: A. briggsi

Binomial name
- Aspasmodes briggsi J. L. B. Smith, 1957

Genus of fishes

Aspasmodes briggsi is a species of clingfish native to the Seychelles. This species grows to a length of 2.5 centimetres (0.98 in) SL. This species is the only known member of its genus. This species was described by J. L. B. Smith in 1957 from a type collected at La Digue, Seychelles. The specific name honours the author of a 1955 monograph on the clingfishes, the American ichthyologist John "Jack" C. Briggs (1920-2018) of the University of Florida.
