= Sicyases hildebrandi =

Conservation status
- Least Concern (IUCN 3.1)

Scientific classification
- Kingdom: Animalia
- Phylum: Chordata
- Class: Actinopterygii
- Order: Blenniiformes
- Family: Gobiesocidae
- Genus: Sicyases
- Species: S. hildebrandi

Binomial name
- Sicyases hildebrandi Schultz, 1944

Species of fish

Sicyases hildebrandi is a species of clingfish from the family Gobiesocidae. It is endemic to the rocky intertidal zones of the Juan Fernández Islands, Chile. It was described in 1944 by Leonard Peter Schultz. Fishbase treats Sicyases hildebrandi as synonymous with S. brevirostris although some authorities still treat S. hildebrandi as a valid species.
