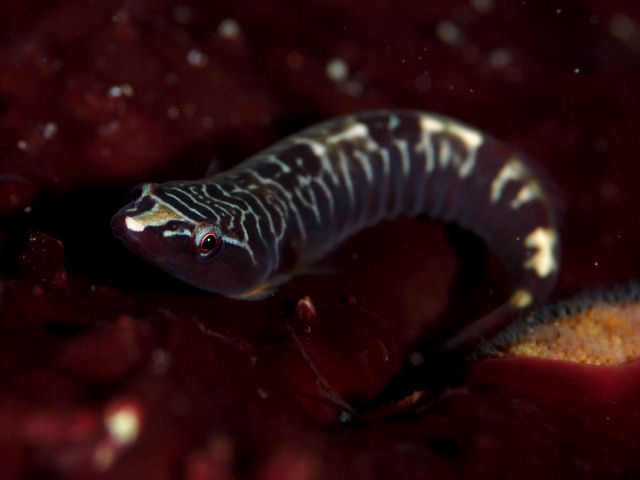
- Pherallodus indicus

Scientific classification
- Kingdom: Animalia
- Phylum: Chordata
- Class: Actinopterygii
- Order: Blenniiformes
- Family: Gobiesocidae
- Genus: Pherallodus; Briggs, 1955
- Species: P. indicus

Binomial name
- Pherallodus indicus (Weber, 1913)

= Pherallodus =

Species of fishes

Pherallodus is an Indo-Pacific genus of clingfishes from the family Gobiesocidae. The only recognized species in this genus is Pherallodus indicus, described by M. C. W. Weber in 1913 as Crepidogaster indicus, but as this was preoccupied it was later moved to Lepadichthys.
