= Derilissus =

Scientific classification
- Kingdom: Animalia
- Phylum: Chordata
- Class: Actinopterygii
- Order: Blenniiformes
- Family: Gobiesocidae
- Subfamily: Gobiesocinae
- Genus: Derilissus; Briggs, 1969

Type species
- Derilissus nanus Briggs, 1969

Genus of fishes

Derilissus is a genus of clingfishes belonging to the family Gobiesocinae found in the western Atlantic Ocean. This family of fish is identified by their appearance as small fish with sucking discs which allow them to attach themselves to various surfaces. Derilissus differs from other genera due to its attached gill membranes.

Derilissus are found inhabiting rocky reef walls and on coral. There are five identified species in the genus Derilissus, all found around the Caribbeans.

== Description ==
Derilissus are typically small fish ranging from 1-3 cm in length, and usually are either pale brown and black or scarlet orange. Derilissus have slender bodies with a slightly depressed and narrow head that holds a short snout. Most species of Derilissus have large eyes and lack a swim bladder. They do not have scales, and are instead protected by a thick layer of mucus. Derilissus is unique from other genera of clingfish due to its attached gill membranes, which restricts the gill openings. Derilissus possess a single row of crowded sharp teeth on both jaws, as well as a dorsal fin.

As a clingfish, Derilissus possess a sucking disc located on the underside of the chest, which is formed primarily by modified pelvic fins. These discs are covered in papillae over most of its surface which allow it to cling to hard substrates such as coral and rocky reef walls.

== Species ==
There are currently five recognized species in this genus:

- Derilissus altifrons Smith-Vaniz, 1971
- Derilissus kremnobates T. H. Fraser, 1970 (Whiskereye clingfish)
- Derilissus lombardii Sparks & Gruber, 2012
- Derilissus nanus Briggs, 1969
- Derilissus vittiger T. H. Fraser, 1970

== Distribution ==
Derilissus lives on corals or on rocky reef walls. They are found in the Western Atlantic, and have been documented in the Caribbean and the Bahamas. Different species of Derilissus inhabit different depths, with some living at depths as shallow as 30 meters to as deep as 265 meters.

The following is a table of preferred depths for members of the Derilissus family and their preferred substrate to cling onto.

Species Name	Preferred Depths (m)	Lives on
Derilissus altifrons	68-69	Coralline algae
Derilissus kremnobates	146-265	Coral rubble banks
Derilissus lombardii	30-132	Vertical reef walls and gorgonian corals
Derilissus nanus	31-51	Coral heads
Derilissus vittiger	67-68	Coralline algae

== Reproduction ==
Reproduction for Derilissus is not very well recorded, but clingfish reproduction typically begins with courtship initiated by the male. After nudging the female, both will shake together in parallel, until the female lays demersal eggs one by one onto a substrate. During this egg laying process which takes from several minutes to hours, the male fertilizes the eggs.

== Diet ==
Derilissus diet varies between each species, but they typically feed on benthic small crustaceans and gastropods such as copepods, isopods and sea snails.

== Life Stages ==
Derilissus eggs are hatched on substrates which the mother lays them upon. After hatching, larval Derilissus are pelagic, and become benthic fish after reaching adulthood.
