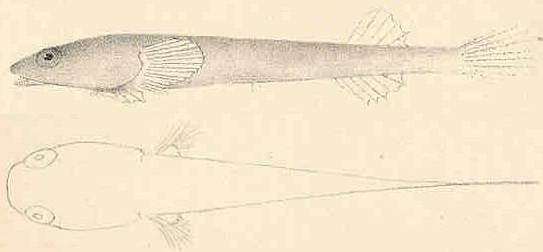
- Rimcola eigenmanni

Scientific classification
- Kingdom: Animalia
- Phylum: Chordata
- Class: Actinopterygii
- Order: Blenniiformes
- Family: Gobiesocidae
- Subfamily: Gobiesocinae
- Genus: Rimicola; D. S. Jordan & Evermann, 1896

Type species
- Gobiesox muscarum Meek & Pierson, 1895

= Rimicola =

Genus of fishes

Rimicola is a genus of clingfishes found along the coasts of the eastern Pacific Ocean.

== Homonymy issue ==
Rimicola has also been given as a name for a genus of isodiametrid flatworms by Böhmig in 1908 which should thus be invalid as per Article 57 of the ICZN.

== Species ==
There are currently five recognized species in this genus:

- Rimicola cabrilloi Briggs, 2002 (Channel Islands clingfish)
- Rimicola dimorpha Briggs, 1955 (Southern clingfish)
- Rimicola eigenmanni (C. H. Gilbert, 1890)
- Rimicola muscarum (Meek & Pierson, 1895) (Kelp clingfish)
- Rimicola sila Briggs, 1955 (Guadalupe clingfish)
