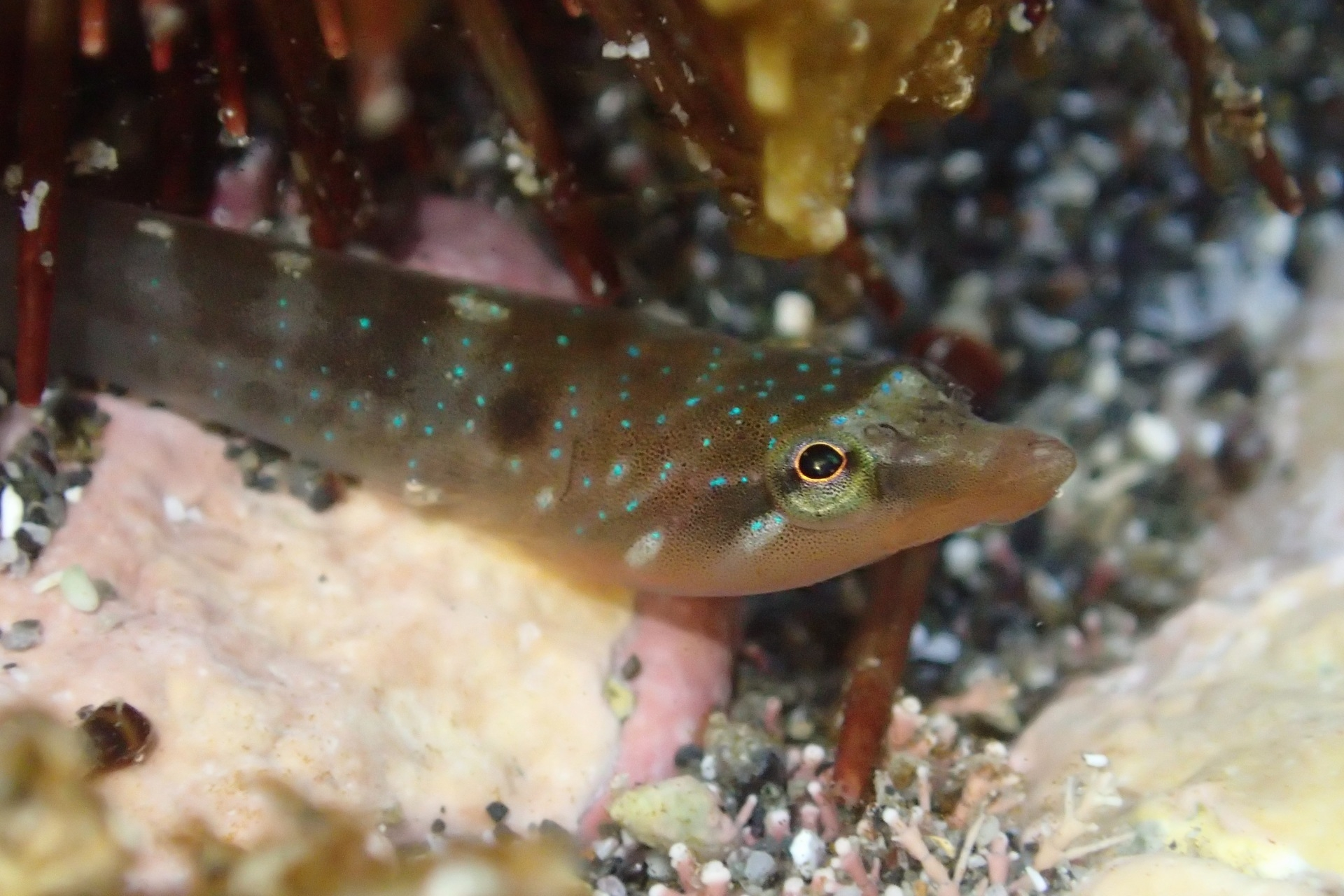
- Dellichthys morelandi

Scientific classification
- Kingdom: Animalia
- Phylum: Chordata
- Class: Actinopterygii
- Order: Blenniiformes
- Family: Gobiesocidae
- Subfamily: Gobiesocinae
- Genus: Dellichthys; Briggs, 1955

Type species
- Dellichthys morelandi Briggs, 1955

= Dellichthys =

Genus of fishes

Dellichthys is a small genus of clingfishes from the family Gobiesocidae which are endemic to New Zealand. It had been regarded as a monotypic genus but a second species was described in 2018.

== Species ==
- Dellichthys morelandi Briggs, 1955 (New Zealand urchin clingfish)
- Dellichthys trnskii Conway, Stewart & Summers, 2018

== Etymology ==
The name of this genus was copined by John C. Briggs in 1955 and it honours the malacologist Richard Kenneth Dell (1920-2002), of the Te Papa Museum in Wellington, New Zealand, he had an interest in the shore fishes of New Zealand and providedmaterial for Briggs to study.
