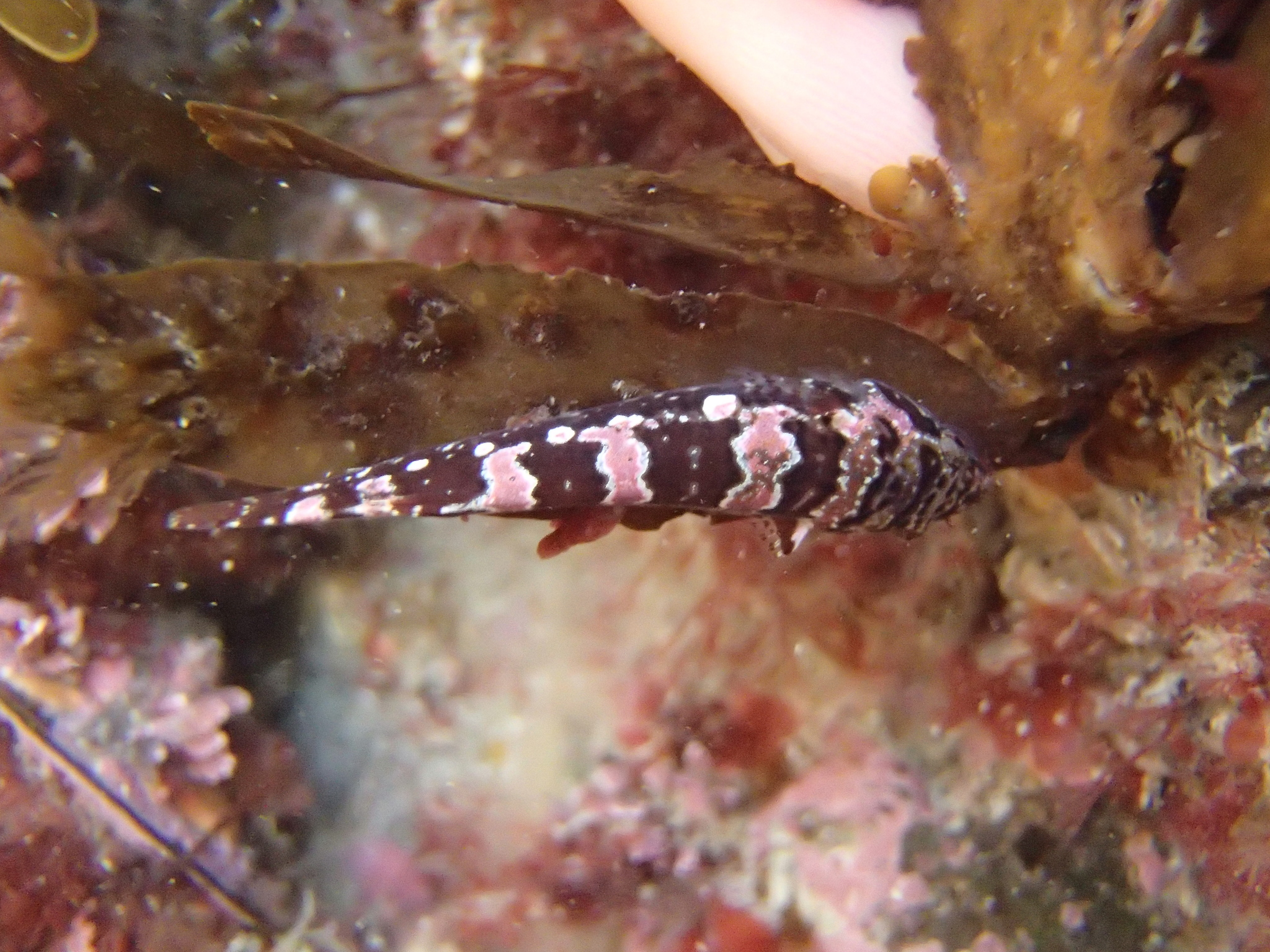

Scientific classification
- Kingdom: Animalia
- Phylum: Chordata
- Class: Actinopterygii
- Order: Blenniiformes
- Family: Gobiesocidae
- Genus: Gastroscyphus; Briggs, 1955
- Species: G. hectoris

Binomial name
- Gastroscyphus hectoris (Günther, 1876)

= Hector's clingfish =

Species of fish

Hector's clingfish (Gastroscyphus hectoris) is a clingfish of the family Gobiesocidae, the only species in the genus Gastroscyphus. It is found all down the east coast of New Zealand around the low water mark amongst seaweed, on rocky coastlines. Its length is up to 6.4 centimetres (2.5 in) SL. This species was described in 1876 by Albert Günther as Crepidogaster hectoris from a holotype collected on the south shore of the Cook Strait. Günther honoured the Scottish-born scientist James Hector (1834-1907) who was the Director of the Geological Survey of New Zealand and who presented type to the British Museum (Natural History).
