= Acyrtops =

Scientific classification
- Kingdom: Animalia
- Phylum: Chordata
- Class: Actinopterygii
- Order: Blenniiformes
- Family: Gobiesocidae
- Subfamily: Gobiesocinae
- Genus: Acyrtops; L. P. Schultz, 1951

Type species
- Gobiesox (Rimicola) beryllinus Hildebrand & Ginsburg, 1927

Genus of fishes

Acyrtops is a genus of clingfishes native to the western Atlantic Ocean.

== Species ==
There are currently two recognized species in this genus:

- Acyrtops amplicirrus Briggs, 1955 (Flarenostril clingfish)
- Acyrtops beryllinus (Hildebrand & Ginsburg, 1927) (Emerald clingfish)
