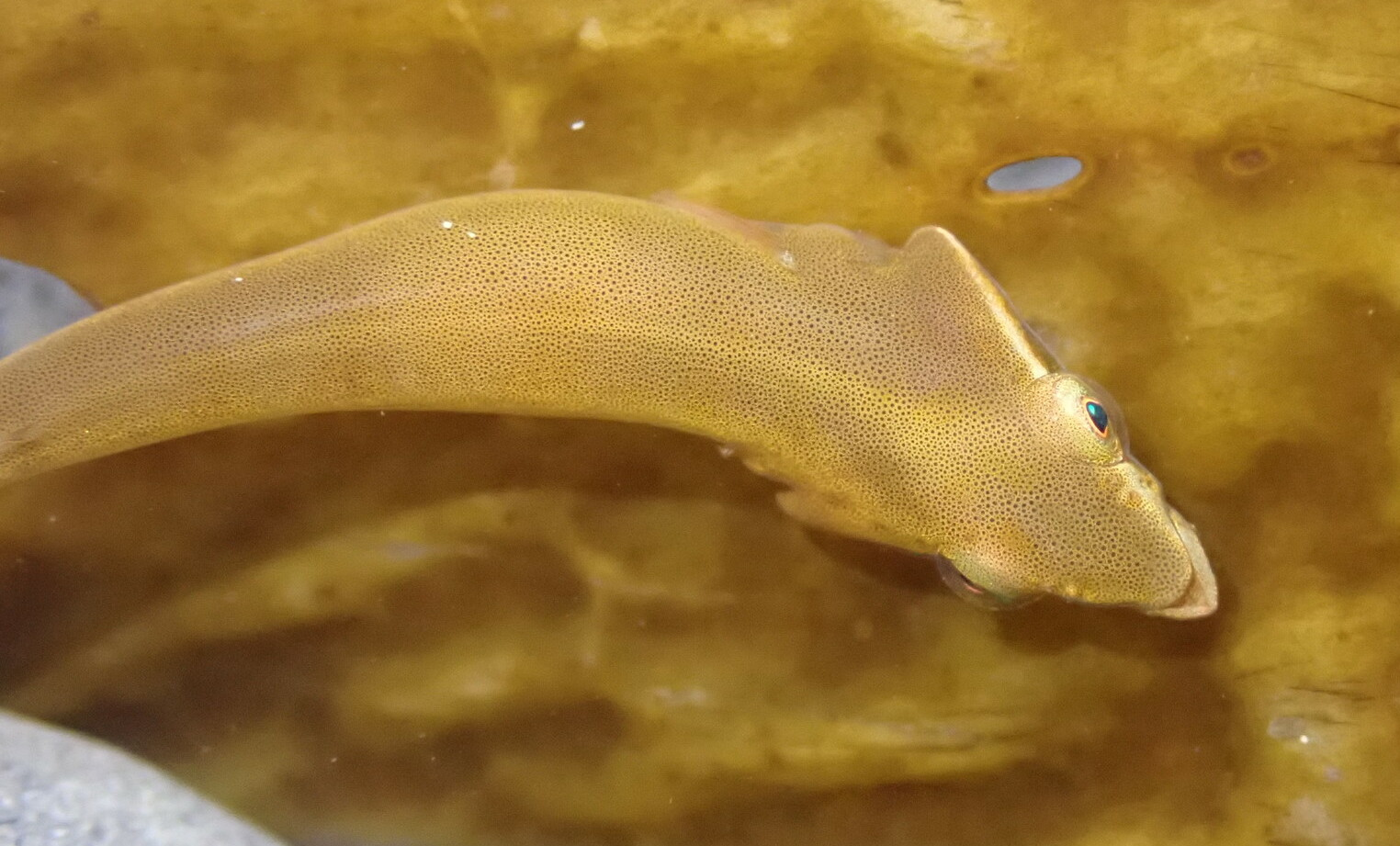

Conservation status
- Least Concern (IUCN 3.1)

Scientific classification
- Kingdom: Animalia
- Phylum: Chordata
- Class: Actinopterygii
- Order: Blenniiformes
- Family: Gobiesocidae
- Genus: Gastrocyathus
- Species: G. gracilis

Binomial name
- Gastrocyathus gracilis Briggs, 1955

= New Zealand slender clingfish =

Species of fish

The Slender clingfish (Gastrocyathus gracilis) is a clingfish of the family Gobiesocidae, the only species in the genus Gastrocyathus. This species grows to a length of 4.5 cm (1.8 in) TL. Endemic to New Zealand, this species is apparently only found in beds of strap-fronded algae. Harpacticoid copepods comprise the main component of their diet.
