= Flabellicauda =

Scientific classification
- Kingdom: Animalia
- Phylum: Chordata
- Class: Actinopterygii
- Order: Blenniiformes
- Family: Gobiesocidae
- Subfamily: Diademichthyinae
- Genus: Flabellicauda; Fujiwara, Conway & Motomura, 2021

Type species
- Flabellicauda alleni Fujiwara, Conway & Motomura, 2021

Genus of fishes

Flabellicauda is a genus of clingfishes from the Indian Ocean and Pacific Ocean.

== Species ==
There are currently four recognized species in this genus:

- Flabellicauda akiko (G. R. Allen & Erdmann, 2012) – Minute clingfish
- Flabellicauda alleni Fujiwara, Conway & Motomura, 2021 – Allen's clingfish
- Flabellicauda bolini (Briggs, 1962) – Bolin's clingfish
- Flabellicauda cometes Fujiwara, Conway & Motomura, 2021 – Comet's clingfish
