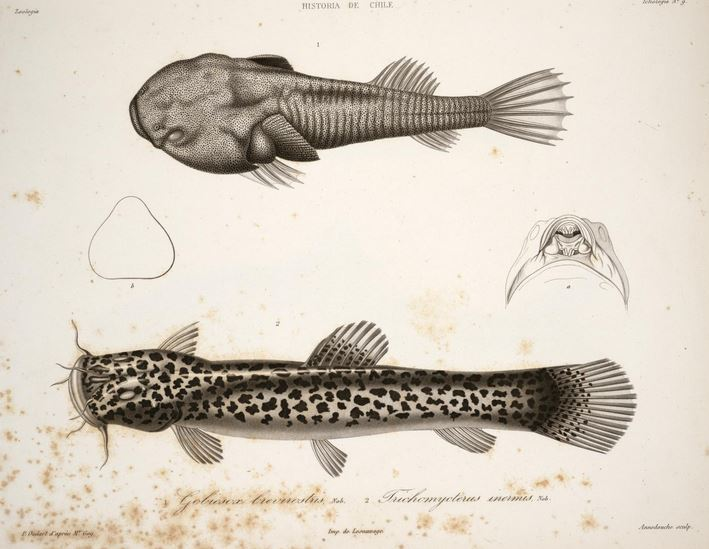
- Sicyases brevirostris (top) with Nematogenys inermis

Conservation status
- Data Deficient (IUCN 3.1)

Scientific classification
- Kingdom: Animalia
- Phylum: Chordata
- Class: Actinopterygii
- Order: Blenniiformes
- Family: Gobiesocidae
- Genus: Sicyases
- Species: S. brevirostris

Binomial name
- Sicyases brevirostris (Guichenot, 1848)

Synonyms
- Gobiesox brevirostris Guichenot, 1848

= Sicyases brevirostris =

Species of fish

Sicyases brevirostris is a species of clingfish from the family Gobiesocidae. It is endemic to the rocky intertidal zones of the Juan Fernández Islands, Chile. It was described in 1848 as Gobiesox brevirostris by Alphonse Guichenot. Fishbase treats Sicyases hildebrandi as synonymous with S. brevirostris although some authorities still treat S. hildebrandi as a valid species.
