= Briggsia =

Conservation status
- Data Deficient (IUCN 3.1)

Scientific classification
- Kingdom: Animalia
- Phylum: Chordata
- Class: Actinopterygii
- Order: Blenniiformes
- Family: Gobiesocidae
- Genus: Briggsia; Craig & J. E. Randall, 2009
- Species: B. hastingsi

Binomial name
- Briggsia hastingsi Craig & J. E. Randall, 2009

Genus of fishes

Briggsia is a genus of clingfishes so far only known from Rahah Bay, Oman. The only known member of the genus is Briggsia hastingsi. This species grows to a length of 2.2 centimetres (0.87 in) SL. It was described in 2009 from the only known specimen by Matthew T. Craig and John E. Randall. The generic name honours the clingfish systematicist John Carmon Briggs (1920-2018) of the Georgia Museum of Natural History while the specific name honours Philip A. Hastings of the Scripps Institute of Oceanography, who was the PhD supervisor of Matthew T. Craig and who sparked his interest in clingfishes.
