= Streaky clingfish =

Conservation status
- Data Deficient (IUCN 3.1)

Scientific classification
- Kingdom: Animalia
- Phylum: Chordata
- Class: Actinopterygii
- Order: Blenniiformes
- Family: Gobiesocidae
- Subfamily: Diademichthyinae
- Genus: Lissonanchus
- Species: L. lusheri

Binomial name
- Lissonanchus lusheri J. L. B. Smith, 1966

Species of fish

The streaky clingfish (Lissonanchus lusheri) is a species of clingfish only known from one specimen collected off the coast of southern Mozambique. The length of the only known specimen was 2.1 centimetres (0.83 in) SL. The single known specimen was collected at Ponte Zavora in southern Mozambique by Mrs D.N. Lusher, who sent it to J. L. B. Smith. Smith described the species from this type and named it in honour of Mrs Lusher, so the spelling should be lusherae to reflect her gender.
