= Lissonanchus =

Scientific classification
- Kingdom: Animalia
- Phylum: Chordata
- Class: Actinopterygii
- Order: Blenniiformes
- Family: Gobiesocidae
- Subfamily: Diademichthyinae
- Genus: Lissonanchus; Smith, 1966

Synonyms
- Briggsia Craig and Randall, 2009

Genus of fishes

Lissonanchus is a genus of clingfishes from the Indian Ocean.

== Species ==
There are currently two recognized species in this genus:

- Lissonanchus hastingsi (Craig & Randall, 2009)
- Lissonanchus lusheri Smith, 1966 – Streaky clingfish
