= Minute clingfish =

Conservation status
- Data Deficient (IUCN 3.1)

Scientific classification
- Kingdom: Animalia
- Phylum: Chordata
- Class: Actinopterygii
- Order: Blenniiformes
- Family: Gobiesocidae
- Subfamily: Diademichthyinae
- Genus: Liobranchia
- Species: L. stria

Binomial name
- Liobranchia stria Briggs, 1955

Species of fish

The minute clingfish (Liobranchia stria) is a tiny species of clingfish native to reef environments around the island of Guam, the Marshall Islands and the Northern Marianas Islands. This species is the only known member of its genus. This species was described in 1955 by John C. Briggs from a type collected off Saipan.
