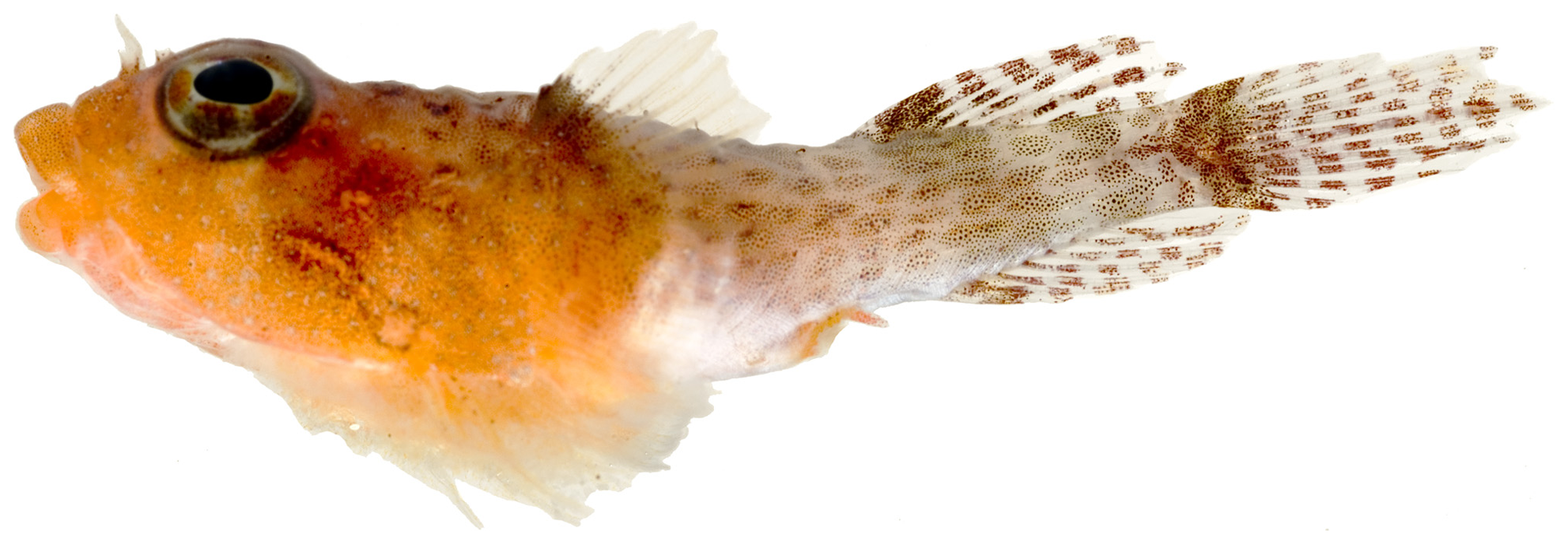
- Papillate Clingfish (A. artius)

Scientific classification
- Kingdom: Animalia
- Phylum: Chordata
- Class: Actinopterygii
- Order: Blenniiformes
- Family: Gobiesocidae
- Subfamily: Gobiesocinae
- Genus: Acyrtus; L. P. Schultz, 1944

Type species
- Sicyases rubiginosus Poey, 1868

= Acyrtus =

Genus of fishes

Acyrtus is a genus of clingfishes found in the western Atlantic Ocean.

== Species ==
There are currently 5 recognized species in this genus:

- Acyrtus artius Briggs, 1955 (Papillate clingfish)
- Acyrtus lanthanum Conway, C. C. Baldwin & M. D. White, 2014 (Orange-spotted clingfish)
- Acyrtus pauciradiatus C. L. S. Sampaio, Nunes & L. F. Mendes, 2004
- Acyrtus rubiginosus Poey, 1868 (Red clingfish)
- Acyrtus simon Gasparini & Pinheiro, 2022

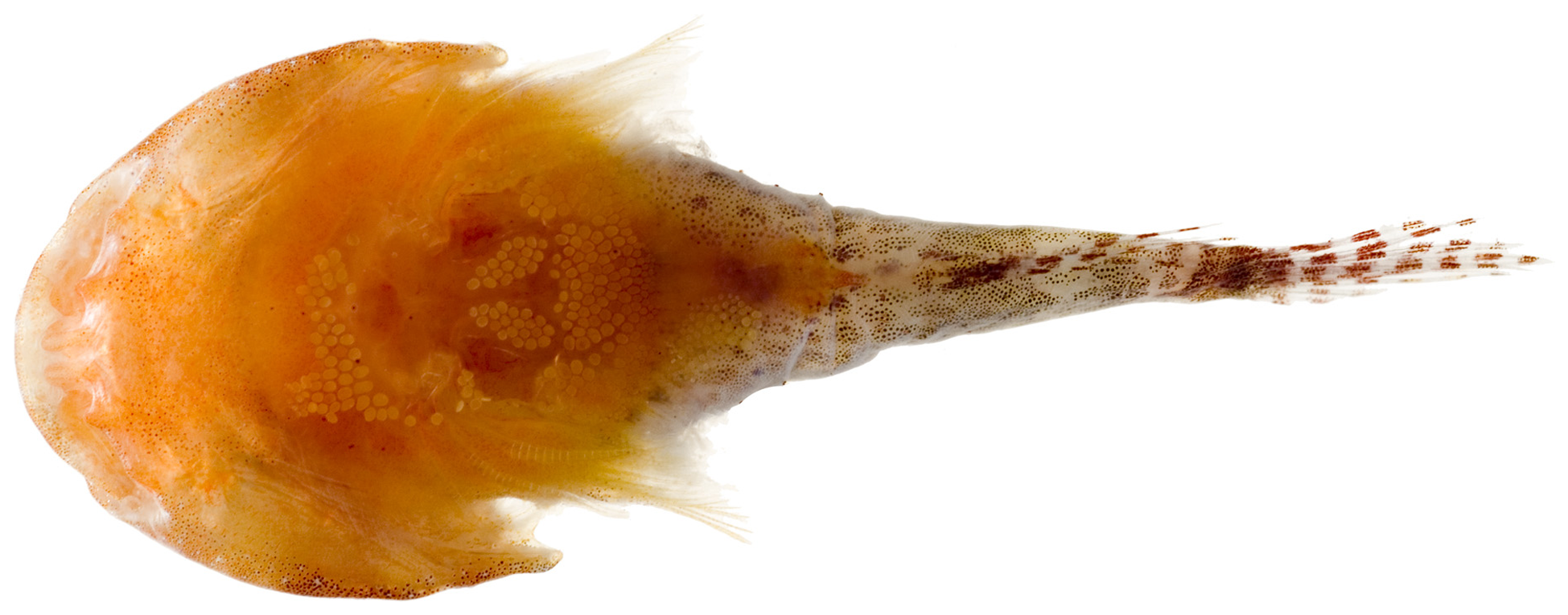
Papillate Clingfish (A. artius) - Ventral view showing pelvic disk
