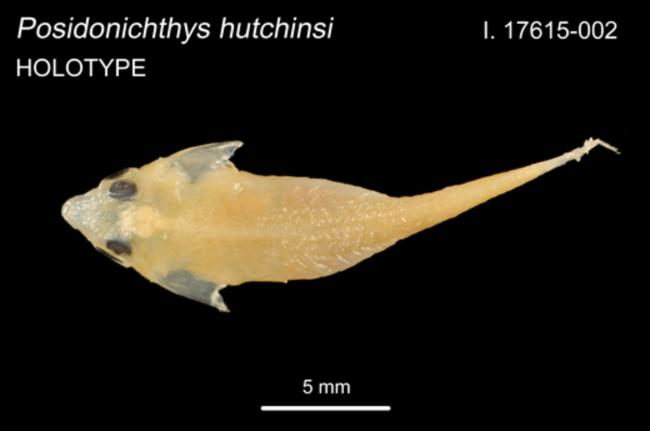
- holotype of Posidonichthys hutchinsi from the Australian Museum

Scientific classification
- Kingdom: Animalia
- Phylum: Chordata
- Class: Actinopterygii
- Order: Blenniiformes
- Family: Gobiesocidae
- Subfamily: Gobiesocinae
- Genus: Posidonichthys
- Species: P. hutchinsi

Binomial name
- Posidonichthys hutchinsi Briggs, 1993

= Posidonia clingfish =

Species of fish

The Posidonia clingfish (Posidonichthys hutchinsi) is a species of clingfish native to the Australia coast. This species grows to a length of 2 centimetres (0.79 in) SL. Pale green to pale blue with fine spots forming dark reticulations on back and sides, larger blue spots often on back, and a pinkish to brown line from snout to gill cover. The posidonia clingfish is endemic to southern Australia where its range extends from Corner Inlet in Victoria west as far as Rottnest Island in Western Australia. It occurs down to a depth of 10 metres (33 ft) where it is found on macroalgae and within seagrass beds, its favoured substrate to adhere to is the leaves of the sea grass Posidonia australis. This species is the only known member of its genus and was described by John C. Briggs in 1993 with a type locality of Fiddler's Bay which is 16 kilometres south of Tamby Bay in South Australia. Briggs gave the species the specific name hutchinsi in honour of the ichthyologist Barry Hutchins of the Western Australia Museum in Perth, Western Australia.
