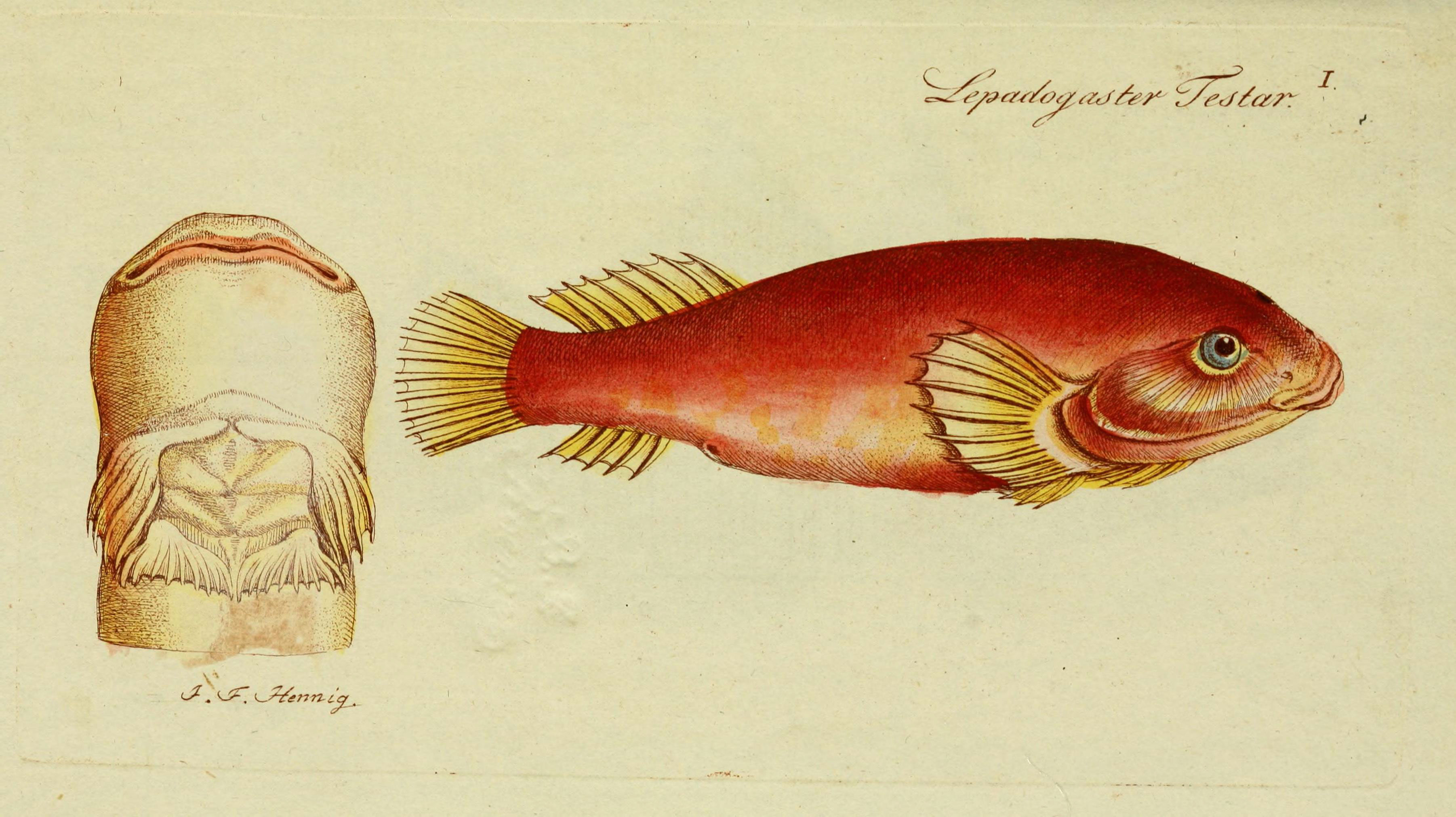
- Arcos nudus

Scientific classification
- Kingdom: Animalia
- Phylum: Chordata
- Class: Actinopterygii
- Division: Teleostei
- Order: Blenniiformes
- Family: Gobiesocidae
- Subfamily: Gobiesocinae
- Genus: Arcos; L. P. Schultz, 1944

Type species
- Gobiesox erythrops Jordan & Gilbert, 1882

= Arcos (fish) =

Genus of fishes

Arcos is a genus of clingfishes.

== Species ==
There are currently 6 recognized species in this genus:

- Arcos decoris Briggs, 1969 (Elegant clingfish)
- Arcos erythrops D. S. Jordan & C. H. Gilbert, 1882 (Rockwall clingfish)
- Arcos macrophthalmus Günther, 1861 (Padded clingfish)
- Arcos nudus Linnaeus, 1758 (Clingfish)
- Arcos poecilophthalmos Jenyns, 1842 (Galapagos clingfish)
- Arcos rhodospilus Günther, 1864 (Rock clingfish)
