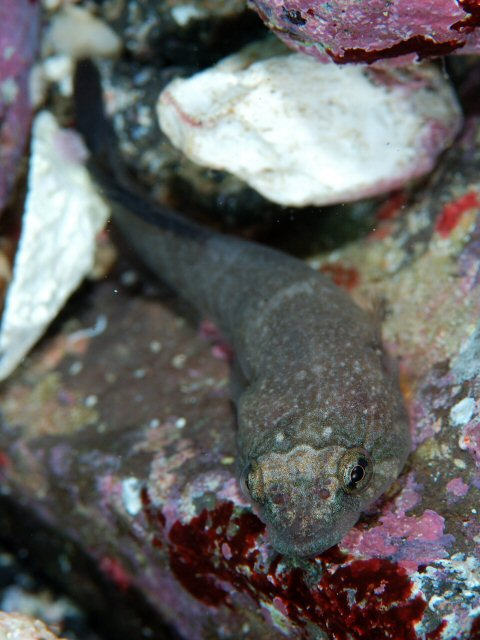
- Conidens laticephalus

Scientific classification
- Kingdom: Animalia
- Phylum: Chordata
- Class: Actinopterygii
- Order: Blenniiformes
- Family: Gobiesocidae
- Subfamily: Gobiesocinae
- Genus: Conidens; Briggs, 1955

Type species
- Crepidogaster samoensis Steindachner, 1906

= Conidens =

Genus of fishes

Conidens is a genus of clingfishes found in the Pacific Ocean.

== Species ==
There are currently two recognized species in this genus:

- Conidens laticephalus (S. Tanaka (I), 1909) (Broadhead clingfish)
- Conidens samoensis (Steindachner, 1906)
