= Gastrocymba quadriradiata =

Conservation status
- Least Concern (IUCN 3.1)

Scientific classification
- Kingdom: Animalia
- Phylum: Chordata
- Class: Actinopterygii
- Order: Blenniiformes
- Family: Gobiesocidae
- Genus: Gastrocymba; Briggs, 1955
- Species: G. quadriradiata

Binomial name
- Gastrocymba quadriradiata (Rendahl (de), 1926)

Synonyms
- Diplocrepis quadriradiatus Rendahl, 1926

Species of fish

Gastrocymba quadriradiata is a clingfish of the family Gobiesocidae, found only around New Zealand's subantarctic islands. This species was described in 1955 by the Swedish zoologist Hialmar Rendahl from a holotype collected at Port Ross on Auckland Island.
