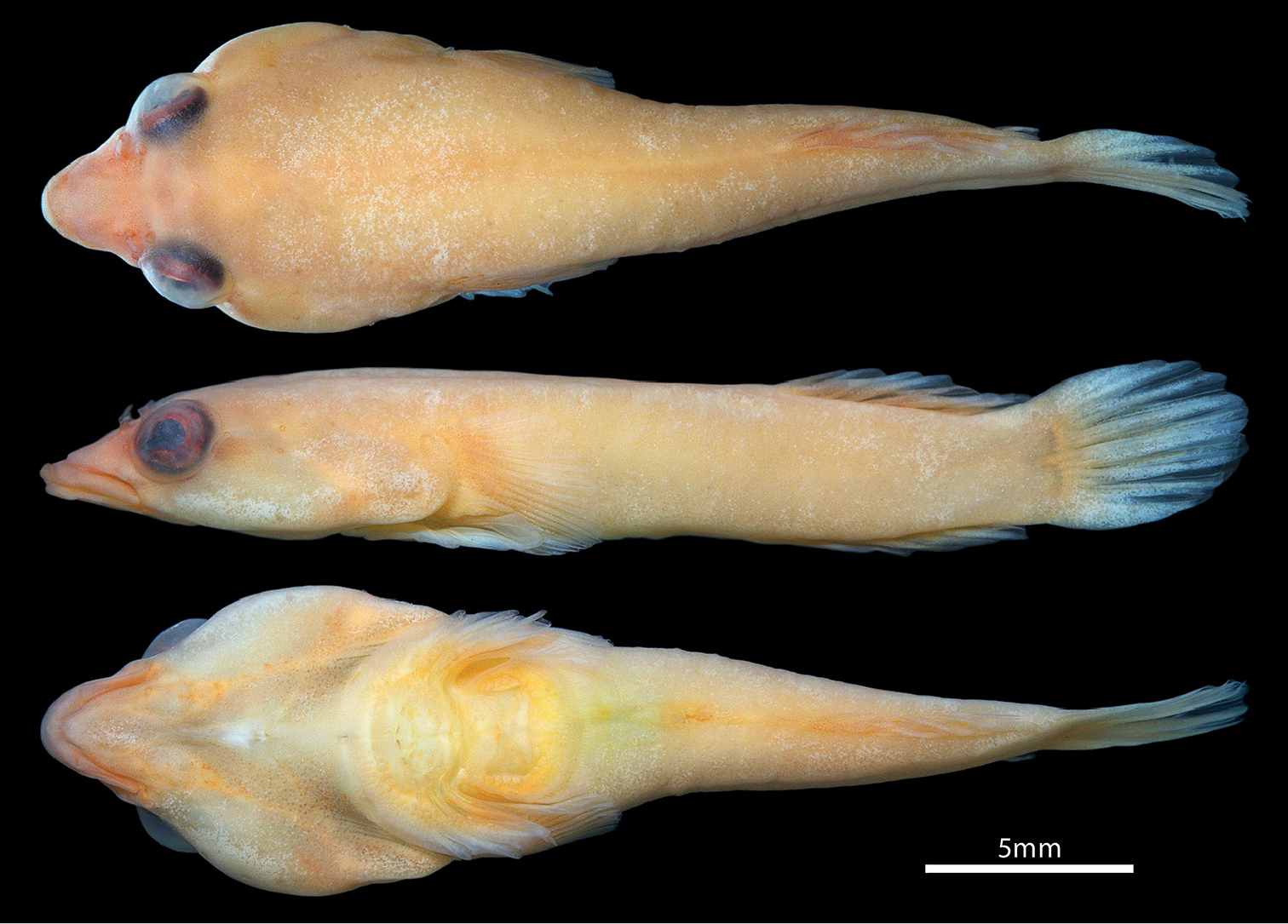

Scientific classification
- Kingdom: Animalia
- Phylum: Chordata
- Class: Actinopterygii
- Order: Blenniiformes
- Family: Gobiesocidae
- Genus: Dellichthys
- Species: D. trnskii

Binomial name
- Dellichthys trnskii Conway, Stewart & Summers, 2018

= Dellichthys trnskii =

Species of fish

Dellichthys trnskii is a species of clingfish. The second species in the genus Dellichthys, it was recently discovered in intertidal and shallow coastal waters of New Zealand. Its length is between 11.9–46.0 mm.

Snout is broad and short. Upper and lower jaws are equal in length. Snout tip and lower jaw are pale pink. Dorsal and lateral surface of head are light yellow to green. Body is pale orange to yellow. Median fins are transparent. Head is large, slightly dorsoventrally compressed. Body width tapers gradually posteriorly. Anterior nostril is a small tubular opening, whereas posterior nostril is tubular. Mouth is terminal and small. Pharyngeal jaws comprise a patch of 16–18 small conical teeth. 10–12 gill rakers are present. Nine rays are in dorsal fin. Seven rays are in anal fin. All fin rays are unbranched and segmented. Caudal fin is rounded. Adhesive disc is large.

== Etymology ==
This species is named in honour of Tom Trnski, the Head of Natural Sciences at the Auckland War Memorial Museum.
