= Protogobiesox asymmetricus =

Conservation status
- Data Deficient (IUCN 3.1)

Scientific classification
- Kingdom: Animalia
- Phylum: Chordata
- Class: Actinopterygii
- Order: Blenniiformes
- Family: Gobiesocidae
- Subfamily: Protogobiesocinae
- Genus: Protogobiesox
- Species: P. asymmetricus

Binomial name
- Protogobiesox asymmetricus R. Fricke, J. N. Chen & W. J. Chen, 2016

Species of fish

Protogobiesox asymmetricus, is a species of fish in the family Gobiesocidae endemic to the deep-water off the north coast of Papua New Guinea. This species is the only known member of its genus. It is found in association with sunken logs and its unusual lateral asymmetry may be an adaptation for this habitat. This species was described by Ronald Fricke, Chen Jhen-Nien and Chen Wei-Jen from a type locality of northeast of Taviltae, Madang Province in Papua New Guinea and these authors placed it in its own subfamily the Protogobiesocinae, though this was later expanded with two other genera.
