= Duck-billed clingfish =

Conservation status
- Data Deficient (IUCN 3.1)

Scientific classification
- Kingdom: Animalia
- Phylum: Chordata
- Class: Actinopterygii
- Order: Blenniiformes
- Family: Gobiesocidae
- Subfamily: Gobiesocinae
- Genus: Nettorhamphos; Conway, Moore & Summers, 2017
- Species: N. radula

Binomial name
- Nettorhamphos radula Conway, G. I. Moore & Summers, 2017

Species of fish

Nettorhamphos radula, the duckbilled clingfish, is a species of clingfish (family Gobiesocidae) from the Indian Ocean off Western Australia. It is currently the sole member of the genus Nettorhamphos.

== Discovery and appearance ==
Nettorhamphos radula was discovered in a jar at the Western Australian Museum and only scientifically described in 2017. The specimen was caught and brought to the museum in the 1977.

The species resembles other clingfish in being small (about 4 cm or 1.6 in) and having a suction cup on its chest, but differs by its large upper jaw that resembles the bill of a duck and its exceptionally high number of microscopic teeth, between 1,800 and 2,300.
