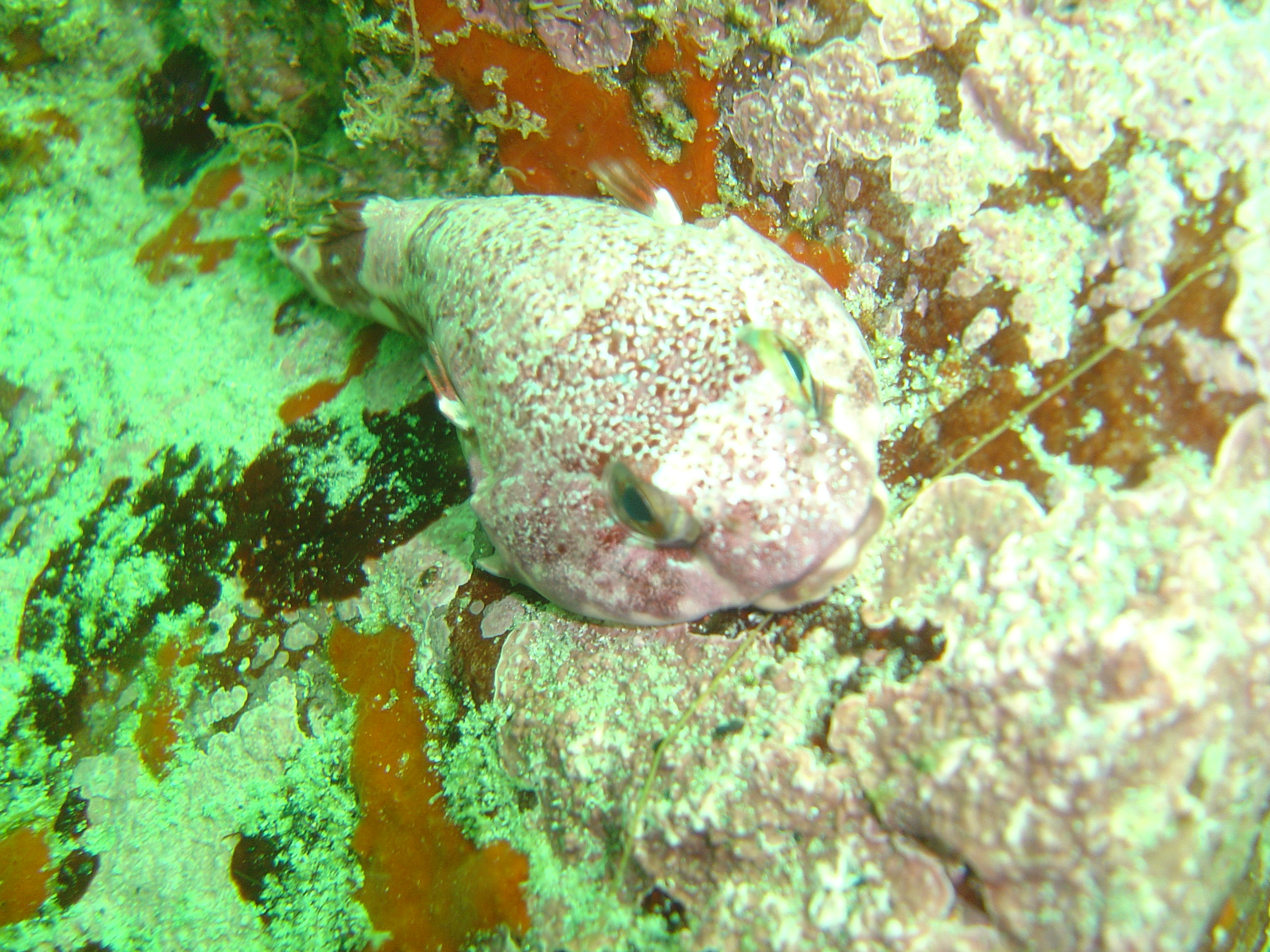

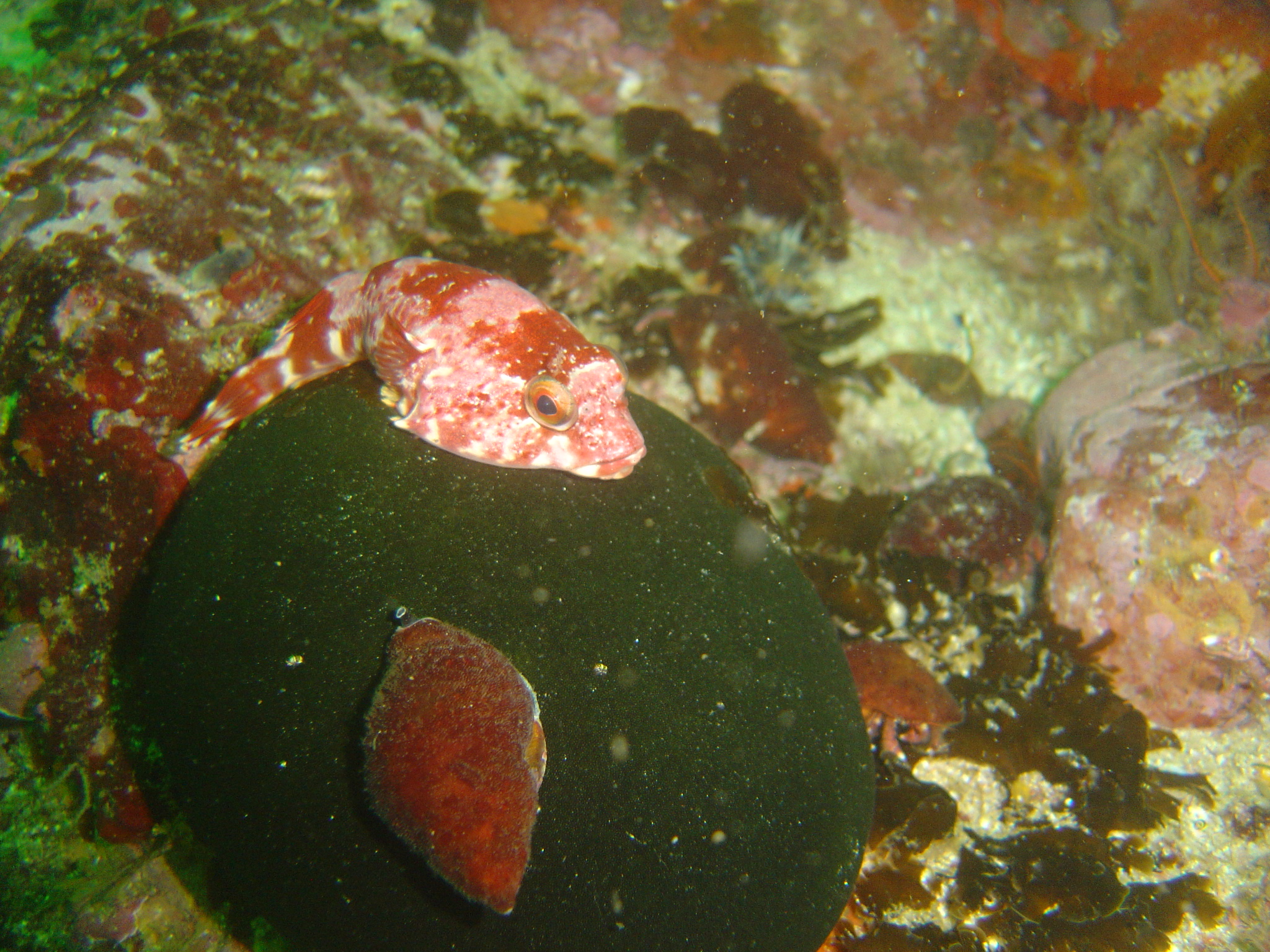

Conservation status
- Least Concern (IUCN 3.1)

Scientific classification
- Kingdom: Animalia
- Phylum: Chordata
- Class: Actinopterygii
- Order: Blenniiformes
- Family: Gobiesocidae
- Genus: Chorisochismus; Brisout de Barneville, 1846
- Species: C. dentex

Binomial name
- Chorisochismus dentex (Pallas, 1769)

Synonyms
- Cyclopterus dentex Pallas, 1769; Gobiesox gyrinus Valenciennes, 1841; Athaena fasciata Castelnau, 1861; Gobiesox fimbriatus Castelnau, 1861

= Chorisochismus =

Genus of fishes

Chorisochismus dentex, the rocksucker or giant clingfish, is a species of clingfish found along the coast of southern Africa from Namibia to northern Natal, South Africa. It inhabits the intertidal and subtidal zones in shallow reefs and rock pools. This species is the only known member of its genus.

== Description ==
C. dentex grows to a total length of 30 cm (12 in) and is the largest species in the clingfish family (together with the similar-sized South American Sicyases sanguineus). It has a broad head that tapers to a narrow tail and has large eyes. It varies in colour, but is typically mottled greenish or reddish. Dead and dried C. dentex are occasionally found by beachcombers, and their often red colour combined with their strange shape and proportionally large teeth have caused some to describe them as "sea monsters".

== Distribution and habitat ==
This species is found living off the coasts of South Africa and Namibia. It is found from intertidal rock pools down to a depth of at least 15 m (49 ft). It is most common in areas with flat boulders, but may also be found in kelp beds or crevices in caves.

== Ecology ==
=== Feeding ===
Feeding varies with age. Juveniles mostly feed on small crustaceans. When between 4 and 8 cm (1.5–3 in) long, they gradually change to an adult diet. Adults are specialized feeders of patellid limpets (almost 75% of their diet), but also take significant quantities of other sea snails and sea urchins, and low levels of chitons. Limpets are typically strongly attached to the rock surface and are difficult to dislodge. First the fish perches next to its prey. It then rapidly lunges forward and up, dives down with its mouth open, inserts its relatively large, fang-like upper front teeth below the edge of the limpet and flips it. It is immediately swallowed whole and the entire sequence typically only lasts about one second. It later regurtiaites the shell, after the flesh has been digested. The prey can be quite large compared to the size of the fish. A 12.2 cm-long (4.8 in) C. dentex contained a 3.1 cm (1.2 in) limpet.
