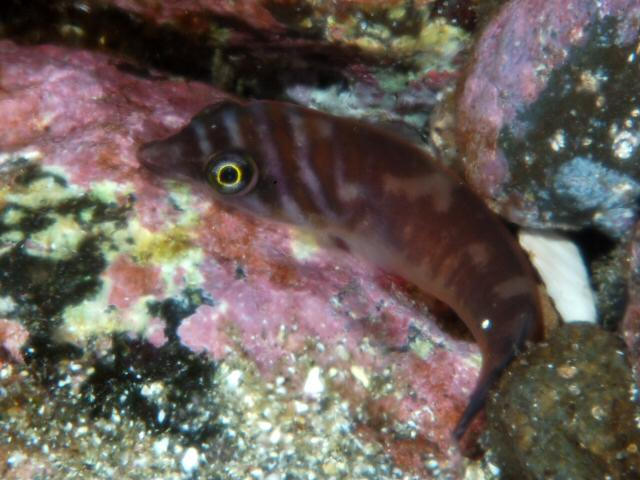

Scientific classification
- Kingdom: Animalia
- Phylum: Chordata
- Class: Actinopterygii
- Order: Blenniiformes
- Family: Gobiesocidae
- Genus: Aspasmichthys
- Species: A. ciconiae

Binomial name
- Aspasmichthys ciconiae (D. S. Jordan & Fowler, 1902)

Synonyms
- Aspasma ciconiae Jordan & Fowler, 1902

= Aspasmichthys ciconiae =

Species of fish

Aspasmichthys ciconiae is a species of clingfish found along Pacific coasts from Japan through Taiwan. This species grows to a length of 5 centimetres (2.0 in) SL. The species was described by David Starr Jordan and Henry Weed Fowler in 1902 from types collected from tide pools near Wakayama in Japan.
