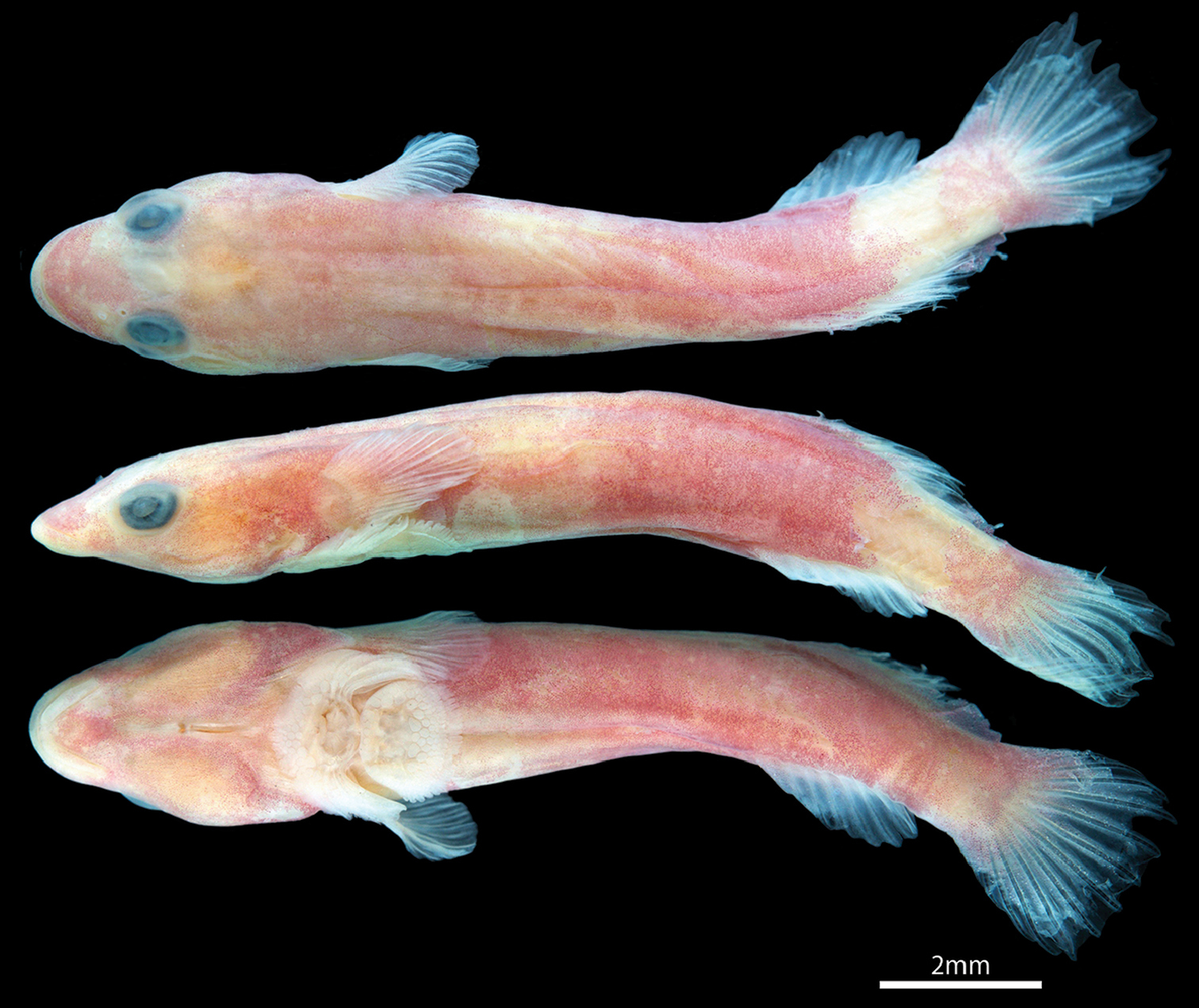

Scientific classification
- Kingdom: Animalia
- Phylum: Chordata
- Class: Actinopterygii
- Order: Blenniiformes
- Family: Gobiesocidae
- Genus: Flexor; Conway, Stewart & Summers, 2018
- Species: F. incus

Binomial name
- Flexor incus Conway, Stewart, Summers, 2018

= Flexor incus =

Species of fish

Flexor is a genus of clingfish from the family Gobiesocidae. It is a monotypic genus, the sole member of which Flexor incus was described in 2018 by Kevin W. Conway, Andrew L. Stewart and Adam P. Summers from type specimens collected on Raoul Island and L'Esperance Rock in the Kermadec Islands. An unknown species of clingfish was known to occur in the Kermadecs and it had been provisionally assigned to the genus Aspasmogaster. When examined, the specimens proved to belong to a new genus which they name Flexor, in reference to the flexibility of clingfishes, and incus (which means "anvil"), a reference to the anvil-like shape of the type locality, Raoul Island.
