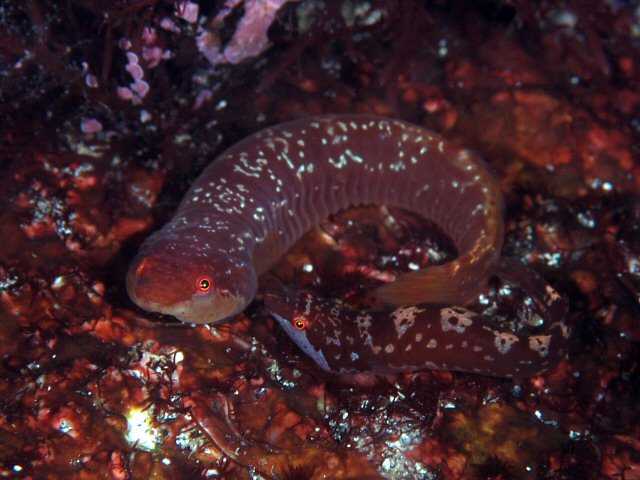
- A pair of Aspasma ubauo

Conservation status
- Least Concern (IUCN 3.1)

Scientific classification
- Kingdom: Animalia
- Phylum: Chordata
- Class: Actinopterygii
- Order: Blenniiformes
- Family: Gobiesocidae
- Genus: Aspasma; D. S. Jordan & Fowler, 1902
- Species: A. ubauo

Binomial name
- Aspasma ubauo Fujiwara & Motomura, 2019

Synonyms
- Lepadogaster minimus not Döderlein, 1887(= Aspasma ubauo Fujiwara & Motomura, 2019)

= Aspasma =

Genus of fishes

Aspasma is a monotypic genus of clingfish found in the Pacific Ocean near the shores of southern Japan. It contains the single species Aspasma ubauo. They are a shallow-water nearshore species, associated with seagrass and brown Sargassum seaweed. This species is commonly misidentified as Kopua minima, which is a deepwater species.

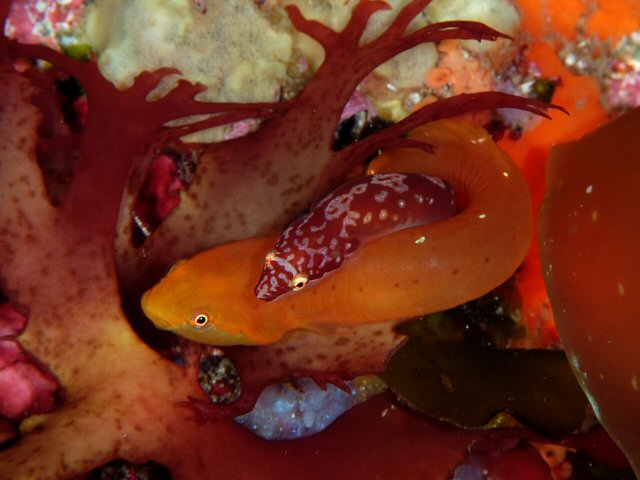
