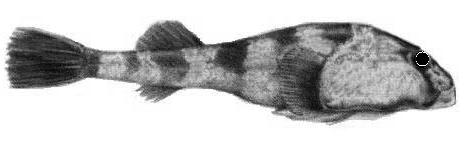

Conservation status
- Least Concern (IUCN 3.1)

Scientific classification
- Kingdom: Animalia
- Phylum: Chordata
- Class: Actinopterygii
- Order: Blenniiformes
- Family: Gobiesocidae
- Genus: Sicyases
- Species: S. sanguineus

Binomial name
- Sicyases sanguineus J. P. Müller & Troschel, 1843

= Sicyases sanguineus =

Species of fish

Sicyases sanguineus is a species of amphibious marine clingfish in the family Gobiesocidae. It lives in the Southeast Pacific along the entire coast of Chile and southern Peru.

Locally, it is known as pejesapo (literally, toad-fish). It inhabits shallow waters, including the intertidal zone. It can often be seen on exposed rocks above water, where it is able to breathe via the branchial surfaces and the skin. As long as it is kept moist by the splash of the wave action, it can survive for up to three days on land. Together with Chorisochismus dentex of southern Africa, it is the largest species of clingfish at up to 30 cm (12 in) long.

== Habitat ==
The fish is characteristic of vertical rock walls in the middle and upper rocky intertidal community along the exposed coasts of Pacific coast of South America, ranging from southern Peru to southern Chile. Its niche is unique, with no known parallel development in other rocky intertidal communities. The most likely determinants of the distribution of Sicyases sanguineus are areas where vertical rocky shorelines encounter ocean swells and ample benthic prey.

Sicyases sanguineus attaches by means of a large disc formed of the fused and highly modified pelvic fins, bearing small and flattened dermal papillae. The combination of suction by disc and adhesion by papillae secure the clingfish to the rock.

== Behavior ==
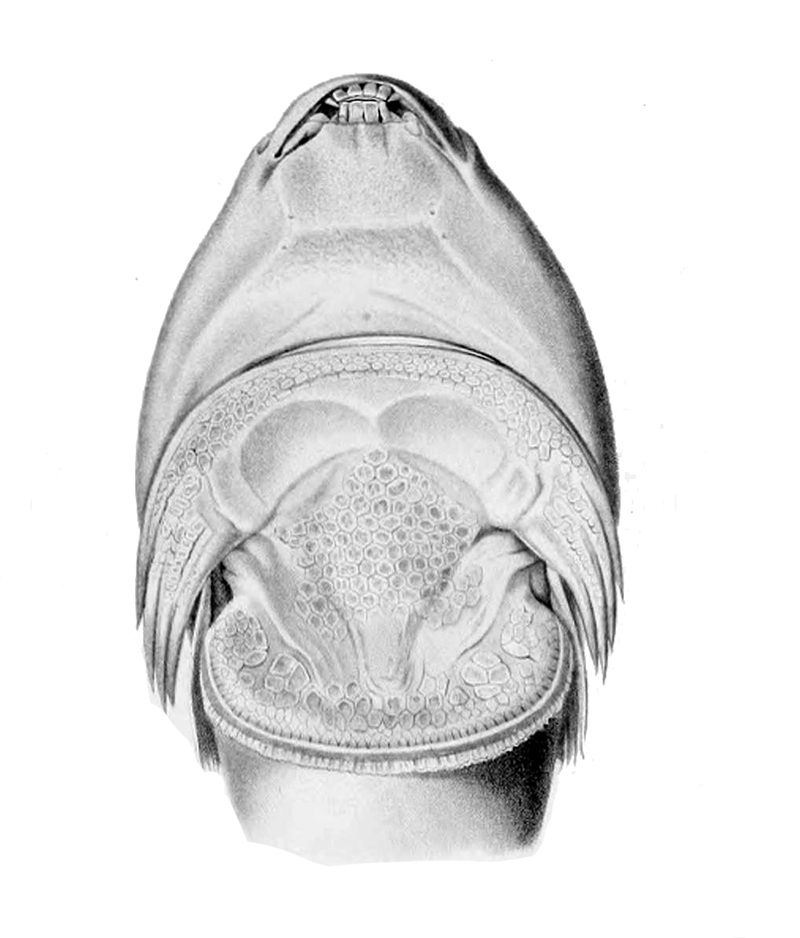
Details of the sucking disc (Sicyases sanguineus viewed from below with mouth at top)

When young, S. sanguineus is gregarious and often congregates on walls. They are alert and can detect moving objects over distances from 10–15 m (33–49 ft). However, adults are quiescent and cluster on exposed rocks often well above water level. Among the many places where they can be seen are the boulder fields in Pozo Toyo and Antofagasta Bay, Chile.

=== Feeding ===
Sicyases sanguineus is omnivorous, feeding on a wide range of algae (brown, green and red) and many types of invertebrates (especially molluscs such as chitons, marine snails, limpets and mussels, and barnacles, but also crabs, isopods, amphipods, insect larvae and sea urchins). They only take relatively small animals. For example, they have been observed living in apparent peace with large chitons and limpets, whereas the small individuals are eaten by this clingfish.

As known from some other clingfish, Sicyases sanguineus has relatively large, protruding front teeth on the upper jaw. The front teeth on the lower jaw are shorter and more chisel-like. When feeding on algae, they scrape the teeth along the rock surface, leaving distinctive marks.

Other methods are used when feeding on molluscs like limpets. The most common way for the fish to connect itself to a flat smooth surface with its ventral sucker. It then repeatedly swings its head in a small arc, raking its teeth downward in strokes. A second mode in which Sicyases sanguineus feed on them is to insert its teeth on the limpet's shell and then twist. This produces a characteristic break into the shell posteriorly and anteriorly.
