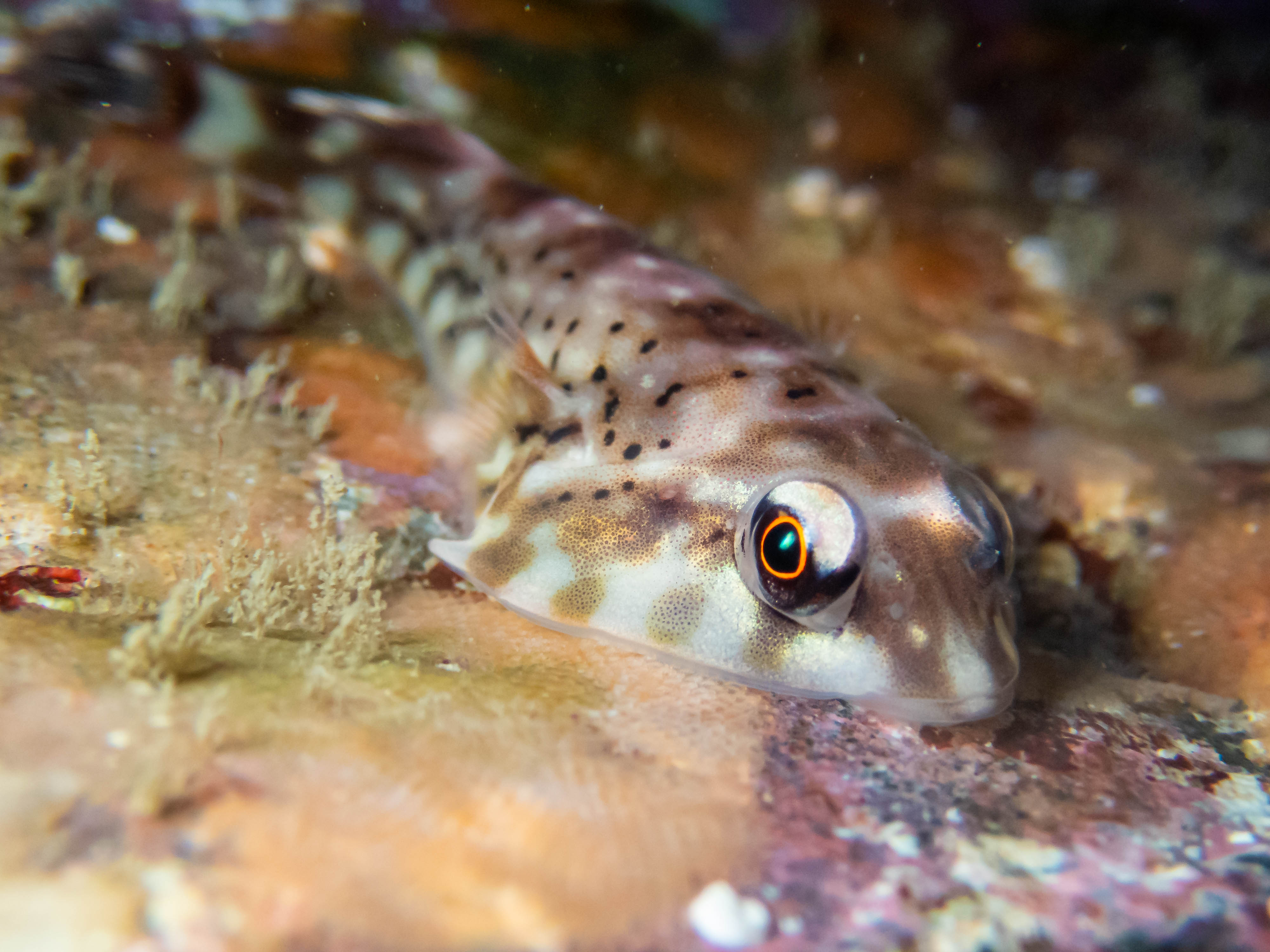

Conservation status
- Least Concern (IUCN 3.1)

Scientific classification
- Kingdom: Animalia
- Phylum: Chordata
- Class: Actinopterygii
- Order: Blenniiformes
- Suborder: Gobiesocoidei
- Family: Gobiesocidae
- Subfamily: Diplocrepinae
- Genus: Diplocrepis
- Species: D. puniceus

Binomial name
- Diplocrepis puniceus (J. Richardson, 1846)

Synonyms
- Lepadogaster puniceus Richardson, 1846

= Orange clingfish =

Species of fish

The orange clingfish (Diplocrepis puniceus) is a clingfish, the only species in the genus Diplocrepis. It is found all around New Zealand from low water to about 5 m (20 ft), on rocky coastlines. This species grows to a length of 12.5 centimetres (4.9 in) SL. It is the only member of its genus, and the only species in the subfamily Diplocrepinae.

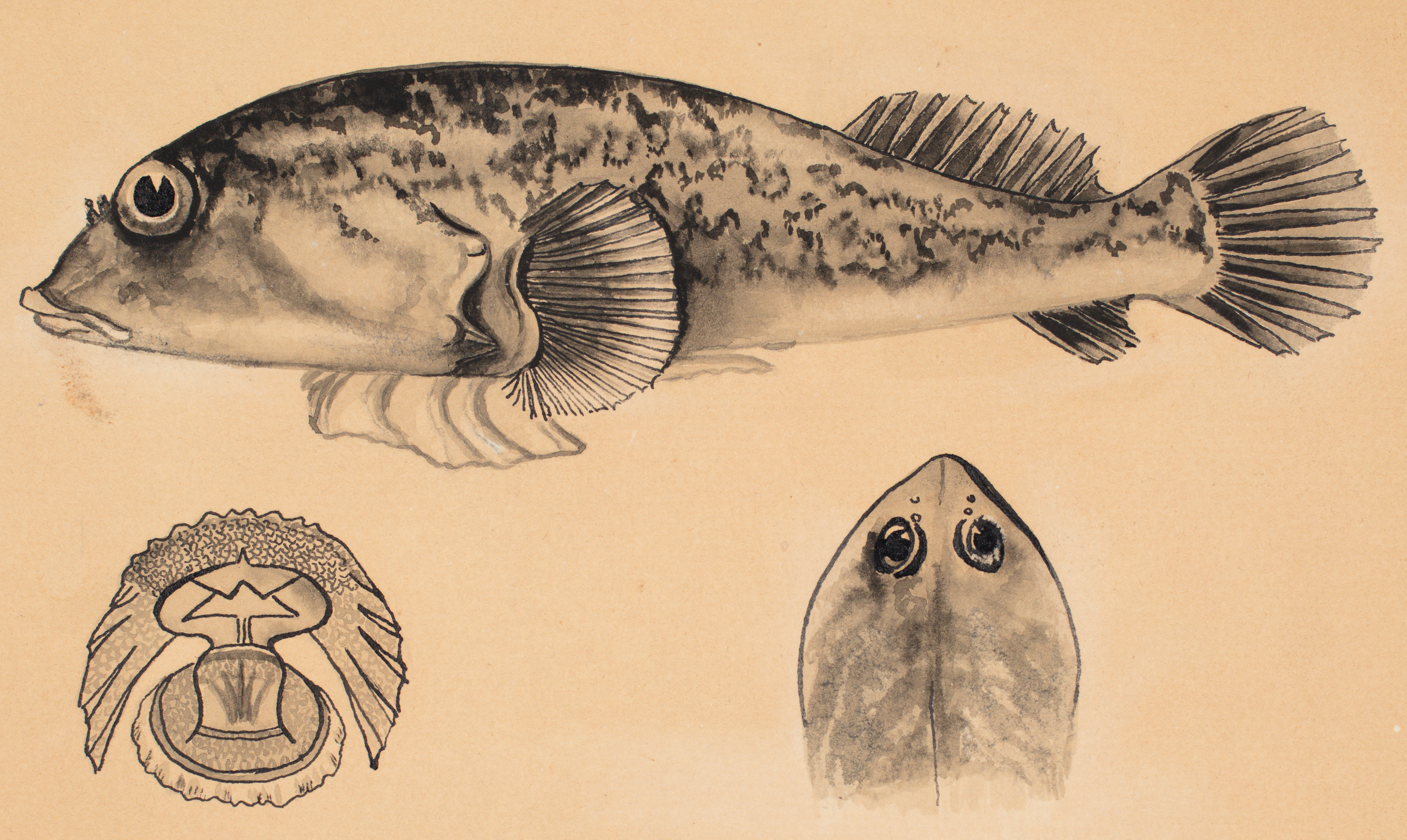
1927 drawing by Louis Thomas Griffin
