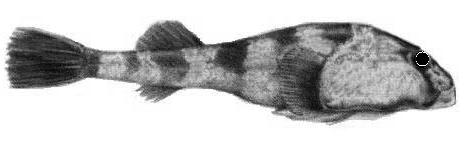
- S. sanguineus

Scientific classification
- Kingdom: Animalia
- Phylum: Chordata
- Class: Actinopterygii
- Order: Blenniiformes
- Family: Gobiesocidae
- Subfamily: Gobiesocinae
- Genus: Sicyases; J. P. Müller & Troschel, 1843

Type species
- Sicyases sanguineus Müller & Troschel, 1843

= Sicyases =

Genus of fishes

Sicyases is a genus of clingfishes native to the coasts of the southeastern Pacific Ocean.

== Species ==
There are currently three recognized species in this genus:

- Sicyases brevirostris (Guichenot, 1848)
- Sicyases hildebrandi Schultz, 1944
- Sicyases sanguineus J. P. Müller & Troschel, 1843
