= Pherallodichthys =

Conservation status
- Least Concern (IUCN 3.1)

Scientific classification
- Kingdom: Animalia
- Phylum: Chordata
- Class: Actinopterygii
- Division: Teleostei
- Order: Blenniiformes
- Family: Gobiesocidae
- Subfamily: Diademichthyinae
- Genus: Pherallodichthys
- Species: P. meshimaensis

Binomial name
- Pherallodichthys meshimaensis Shiogaki & Dotsu, 1983

Species of fish

Pherallodichthys meshimaensis is a species of clingfish known from the western Pacific Ocean in reef environments around Japan and the Philippines. This species grows to a length of 3 centimetres (1.2 in) TL though more commonly they only reach a length of 1.9 centimetres (0.75 in) SL. This species is the only known member of its genus.
