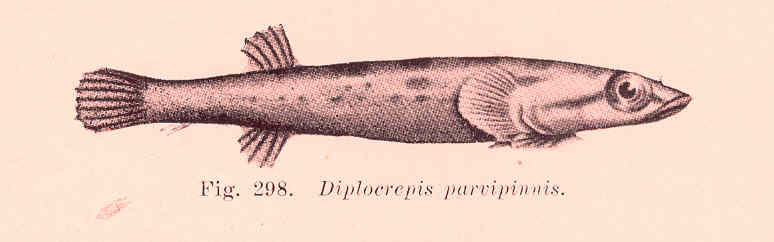

Conservation status
- Least Concern (IUCN 3.1)

Scientific classification
- Kingdom: Animalia
- Phylum: Chordata
- Class: Actinopterygii
- Order: Blenniiformes
- Family: Gobiesocidae
- Subfamily: Gobiesocinae
- Genus: Parvicrepis; Whitley, 1931
- Species: P. parvipinnis

Binomial name
- Parvicrepis parvipinnis (Waite, 1906)

Synonyms
- Diplocrepis parvipinnis Waite, 1906

= Little clingfish =

Species of fish

The little clingfish (Parvicrepis parvipinnis) is a species of clingfish found in reef environments along the coast of Australia. This species grows to a length of 3 centimetres (1.2 in) TL. This species is the only known member of its genus. This species was described by Edgar Ravenswood Waite as Diplocrepis parvipinnis in 1906 with a type locality of Long Bay, Sydney, New South Wales. In 1931 Gilbert Percy Whitley raised the monotypic genus Parvicrepis for this species.
