= Gymnoscyphus =

Conservation status
- Least Concern (IUCN 3.1)

Scientific classification
- Kingdom: Animalia
- Phylum: Chordata
- Class: Actinopterygii
- Order: Blenniiformes
- Family: Gobiesocidae
- Subfamily: Protogobiesocinae
- Genus: Gymnoscyphus
- Species: G. ascitus

Binomial name
- Gymnoscyphus ascitus J. E. Böhlke & C. R. Robins, 1970

Genus of fishes

Gymnoscyphus ascitus, the alien clingfish, is a small species of clingfish found in the Caribbean Sea (documented off of Cuba (Jardines del Rey archipelago), Cozumel and St. Vincent) at depths of 231 to 318 m (760–1,040 ft). This species is the only known member of the genus Gymnoscyphus.
