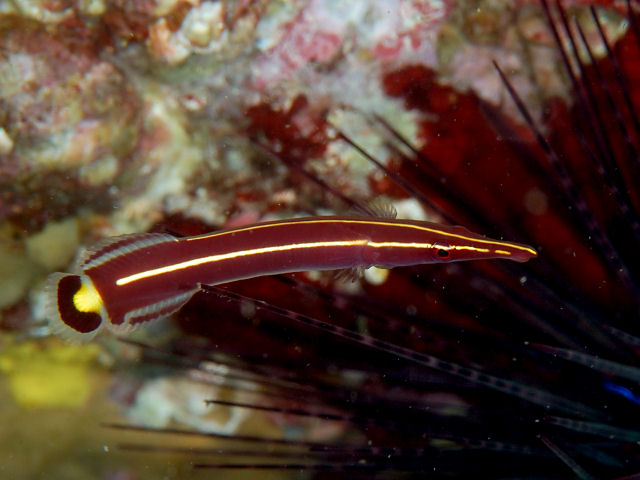

Conservation status
- Least Concern (IUCN 3.1)

Scientific classification
- Kingdom: Animalia
- Phylum: Chordata
- Class: Actinopterygii
- Order: Blenniiformes
- Family: Gobiesocidae
- Subfamily: Diademichthyinae
- Genus: Diademichthys; Pfaff, 1942
- Species: D. lineatus

Binomial name
- Diademichthys lineatus (Sauvage, 1883)

Synonyms
- Crepidogaster lineatum Sauvage, 1883; Coronichthys ornata Herre, 1942; Diademichthys deversor Pfaff, 1942

= Diademichthys lineatus =

Species of fish

Diademichthys lineatus, commonly known as the long-snout clingfish or urchin clingfish, is a species of marine fish in the family Gobiesocidae.

== Description ==
The long-snout clingfish is a small type of fish, which can grow up to 5 centimetres (2.0 in).

It has an elongated body and a stretched and spatulate snout. The snout is a criterion for recognizing the sex of the fish, since females have a longer and finer snout than males. This sexual dimorphism reflects a different diet between the two sexes.

The body's background color varies from dark brown to red-brown, and the body has three yellowish longitudinal lines that run along it, one on the top of the body and the two others on the median axis of the sides of the fish. The caudal fin is marked by a yellow spot in its center, and the snout can also have some yellow coloration.

The longsnouted clingfish has been found to release a grammistin-like toxic mucus on its skin.

== Distribution and habitat ==
Long-snout clingfish are widespread throughout the tropical waters of the Indo-West Pacific region, inhabiting the region from the Gulf of Oman to Papua New Guinea.

They are found in reef environments often associated with long-spined sea urchins particularly of the genus Diadema.

== Alimentation ==
Long-snout clingfish feed mainly on burrowing bivalves in corals, tube feet of their host, and eggs of a commensal shrimp. The fish's sexual dimorphism is caused by a difference between the male's and the female's diet, causing the adult female to have a longer snout. The adult female eats small bivalves and shrimp's eggs more often than the adult males, who eat tube feet more frequently.
