= Erdmannichthys =

Conservation status
- Data Deficient (IUCN 3.1)

Scientific classification
- Kingdom: Animalia
- Phylum: Chordata
- Class: Actinopterygii
- Order: Blenniiformes
- Family: Gobiesocidae
- Genus: Erdmannichthys; Conway, Fujiwara, Motomura & Summers, 2021
- Species: E. alorensis

Binomial name
- Erdmannichthys alorensis (G. R. Allen & Erdmann, 2012)

Synonyms
- Aspasmichthys alorensis Allen & Erdmann, 2012

Species of fish

Erdmannichthys is a monotypic genus of clingfish found in the western Pacific Ocean in Indonesia. The only species is Erdmannichthys alorensis which was described by Gerald R. Allen and Mark Erdmann in 2012 from a type collected at submerged reef in the Alor Strait, East Nusa Tenggara, Indonesia at a depth of 16 metres (52 ft). It is apparently associated with sponges.
