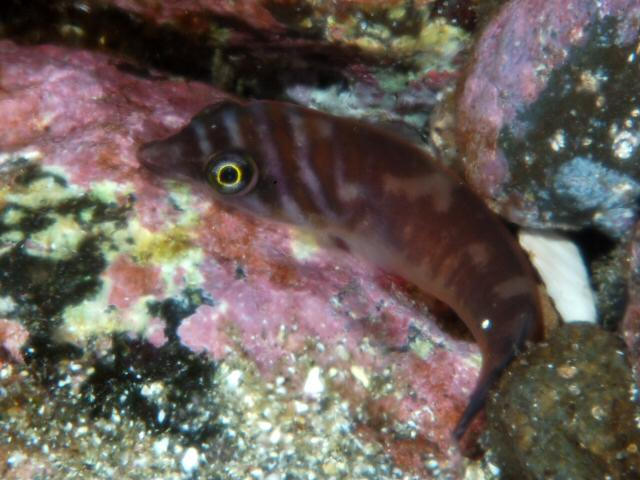
- Aspasmichthys ciconiae

Scientific classification
- Kingdom: Animalia
- Phylum: Chordata
- Class: Actinopterygii
- Division: Teleostei
- Clade: Ovalentaria
- Order: Blenniiformes
- Suborder: Gobiesocoidei
- Family: Gobiesocidae; Bleeker, 1860

Type species
- Gobiesox cephalus Lacépède, 1800

= Gobiesocidae =

Clingfishes Temporal range: 23.03-0 Ma Early Miocene–Present

Family of ray-finned fishes

Clingfishes are ray-finned fishes of the family Gobiesocidae, the only family in the suborder Gobiesocoidei of the order Blenniiformes. These fairly small to very small fishes are widespread in tropical and temperate regions, mostly near the coast, but a few species live in deeper seas or fresh water. Most species shelter in shallow reefs or seagrass beds, clinging to rocks, algae and seagrass leaves with their sucking disc, a structure on their chest.

They are generally too small to be of interest to fisheries, although the relatively large Sicyases sanguineus regularly is caught as a food fish, and some of the other species occasionally appear in the marine aquarium trade.

== Distribution and habitat ==
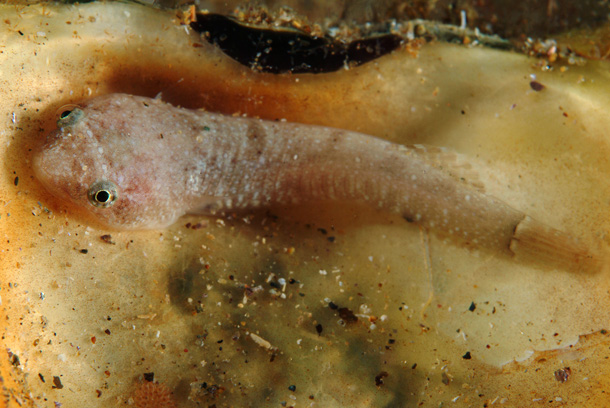
Many clingfish live in the intertidal zone and can survive for long periods out of water, as first described for Diplecogaster bimaculata in 1891

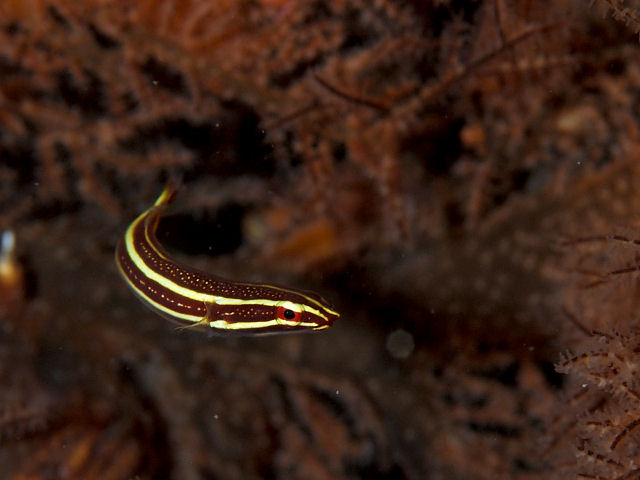
Lepadichthys lineatus and some other clingfish species are associated with crinoids

Clingfishes are primarily found near the shore in the Atlantic, Indian and Pacific Oceans, including marginal seas such as the Mediterranean, Gulf of Mexico, Caribbean and Gulf of California. The greatest species richness is in tropical and warm temperate regions, but the range of a few extends into colder waters, like Diplecogaster bimaculata (north to Norway), Apletodon dentatus, Lepadogaster candolii and L. purpurea (all three north to Scotland; the last formerly mistaken for the mostly Mediterranean L. lepadogaster), Gobiesox maeandricus (north to Alaska), Gobiesox marmoratus and Sicyases sanguineus (both to southernmost South America), and Gastrocymba quadriradiata (from New Zealand's subantarctic islands).

Clingfishes mainly inhabit shallow rocky reefs and shores, coral reefs, seagrass meadows and algae beds. They often live in places exposed to strong currents and wave action, and some are amphibious. As long as the strongly amphibious, intertidal-living species are kept moist by splashing waves, they can survive for up to three–four days on land, gaining oxygen from the air by the branchial surfaces (gills), skin and perhaps the mouth. At least a few species even tolerate a relatively high degree of water loss when on land.

A relatively small number of species shelter in sea urchins or crinoids. Whether this relationship is obligate (clingfish always with a sea urchin or crinoid) or facultative (clingfish sometimes with a sea urchin or crinoid) varies with species. In some, only young clingfish are obligate and gradually move away as they become adult. Three clingfish species, the Australian Cochleoceps bicolor and C. orientalis, and the warm East Atlantic Diplecogaster tonstricula, are cleaner fish that will cling onto the bodies of larger fish.

Although several species can occur in brackish water, only seven (Gobiesox cephalus, G. fluviatilis, G. fulvus, G. juniperoserrai, G. juradoensis, G. mexicanus and G. potamius) from warmer parts of the Americas are freshwater fish that live in fast-flowing rivers and streams.

Most known clingfish species are from relatively shallow coastal waters, but several inhabit the mesophotic zone and a few even deeper, with Alabes bathys, Gobiesox lanceolatus, Gymnoscyphus ascitus, Kopua kuiteri, K. nuimata and Protogobiesox asymmetricus reported from depths of 300–560 m (980–1,840 ft). Because of their small size and typical habitat, it is however suspected that still-undiscovered deep-water species remain. Even in shallow coastal waters many clingfish are highly cryptic and easily overlooked, mostly staying under cover, although there are species that are active and will swim in the open. As a consequence their abundance is often not well known. Several species are only known from a single or a few specimens. Species that appear uncommon or rare based on standard methods can actually be common if using methods that are more suitable for detecting them. Studies of better-known species have shown that they can be locally abundant. As many as 23 individuals of Lepadogaster lepadogaster have been documented from a single square metre (more than two individuals per square foot). As of 2018, the IUCN has evaluated the conservation status of 84 clingfish species (roughly half the species in the family). The majority of these are considered least concern (not threatened), 17 are considered data deficient (available data prevents an evaluation), 8 considered vulnerable and a single endangered. The vulnerable and endangered species all have small distributions, restricted to islands or a single bay. Three Gobiesox species that are restricted to fresh water in Mexico have not been rated by the IUCN, but are considered threatened by Mexican authorities.

== Description ==
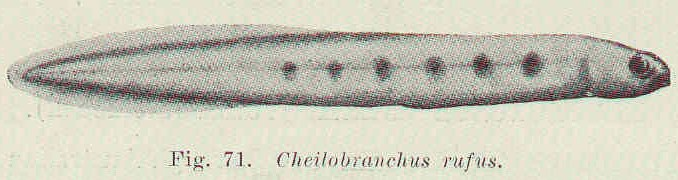
Alabes are eel-like, unlike other clingfish

Clingfishes are typically small fish, with most species less than 7 cm (2.8 in) in length, and the smallest no more than 1.5 cm (0.6 in). Only a few species can surpass 12 cm (4.7 in) in length and the largest, Chorisochismus dentex and Sicyases sanguineus, both reach up to 30 cm (12 in). Males typically grow larger than females.

Most clingfish species have tapering bodies and flattened heads, appearing somewhat tadpole-like in their overall shape. They lack a swim bladder. The lateral line of clingfish is well developed, but may not extend to the posterior parts of the body. The skin of clingfishes is smooth and scaleless, with a thick layer of protective mucus. In at least Diademichthys lineatus and Lepadichthys frenatus, the mucus production increases if the fish is disturbed. The taste of their mucus is highly bitter to humans and it can kill other fish. This is due to their skin and mucus containing a grammistin-like toxin (the toxin in soapfish, such as Grammistes). Whether any other clingfish has toxins in its skin or mucus is currently unknown. Another defense appears to be present in a couple of Acyrtus and Arcos species. They have a spine at their gill cover and it appears to be connected to a venom gland. Although the evidence presently is circumstantial, this strongly suggests that the world's smallest venomous fish is Acyrtus artius, which is less than 3 cm (1.2 in) long.

=== Sucking disc ===
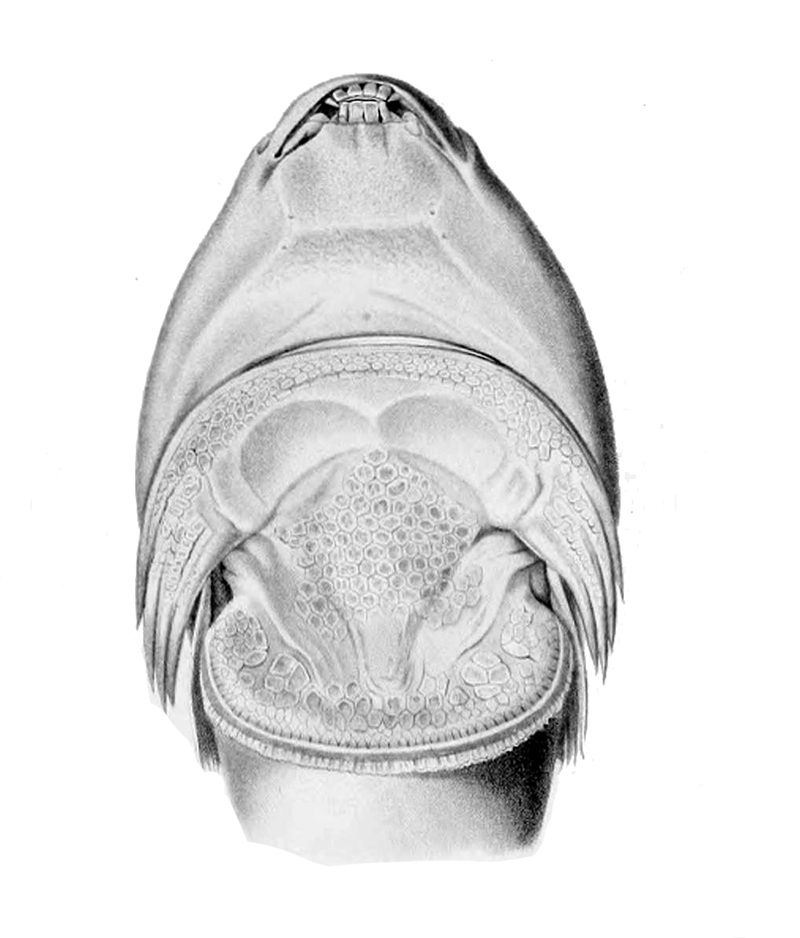
Sucking disc of Sicyases sanguineus (viewed from below with mouth at the top)

Clingfish are named for their ability to firmly attach themselves to various surfaces, even in strong water currents or when battered by waves. This ability is aided by their sucking disc, which is located on the underside at the chest and is formed primarily by modified pelvic fins and adjacent tissue. In some species it is divided in two, resulting in a larger front and a smaller rear sucking disc. The sucking disc is covered in tiny hexagons and each of these consists of many microscopic hair-like structures (setae). This is similar to the structures that allow geckos to cling to walls. The sucking disc can be remarkably strong, in some species able to lift as much as 300 times the weight of the clingfish. Gobies (family Gobiidae) can have a similar sucking disc, but unlike that family the single dorsal fin in clingfish is not spiny. In a few clingfish species the disc is reduced or even absent, notably Alabes, which are quite eel-like in their shape and aptly named shore-eels. The sucking disc is also reduced in some deep-water clingfish species.

=== Colours ===
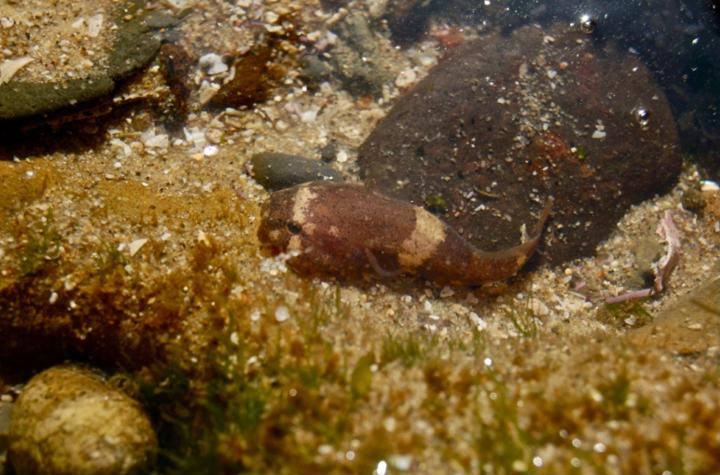
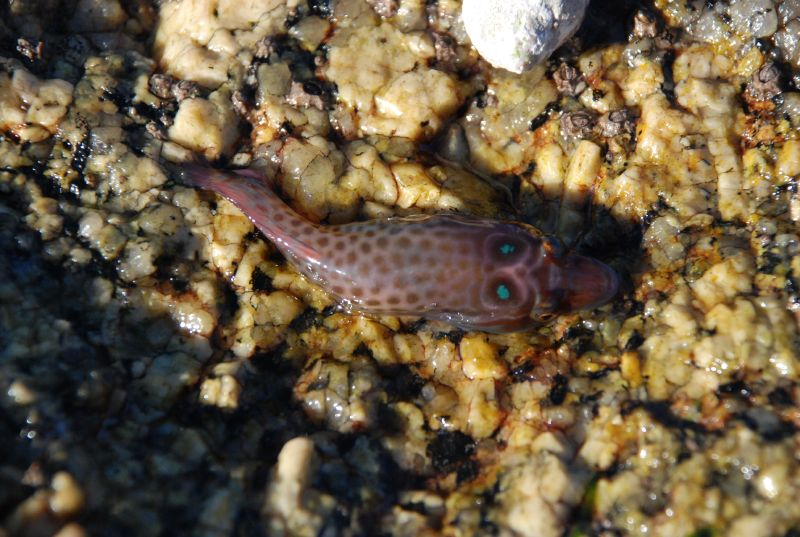
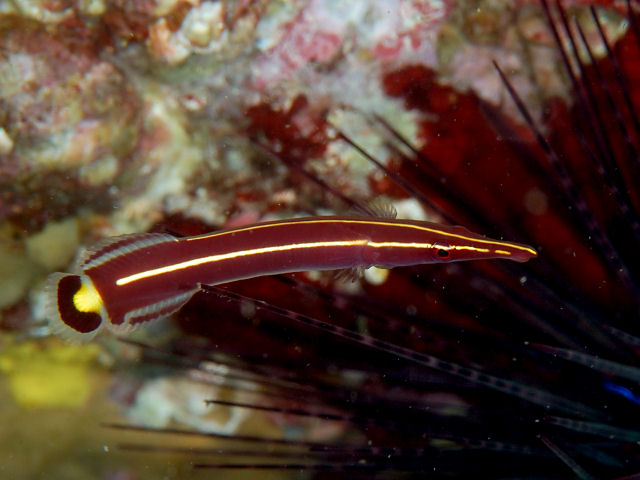
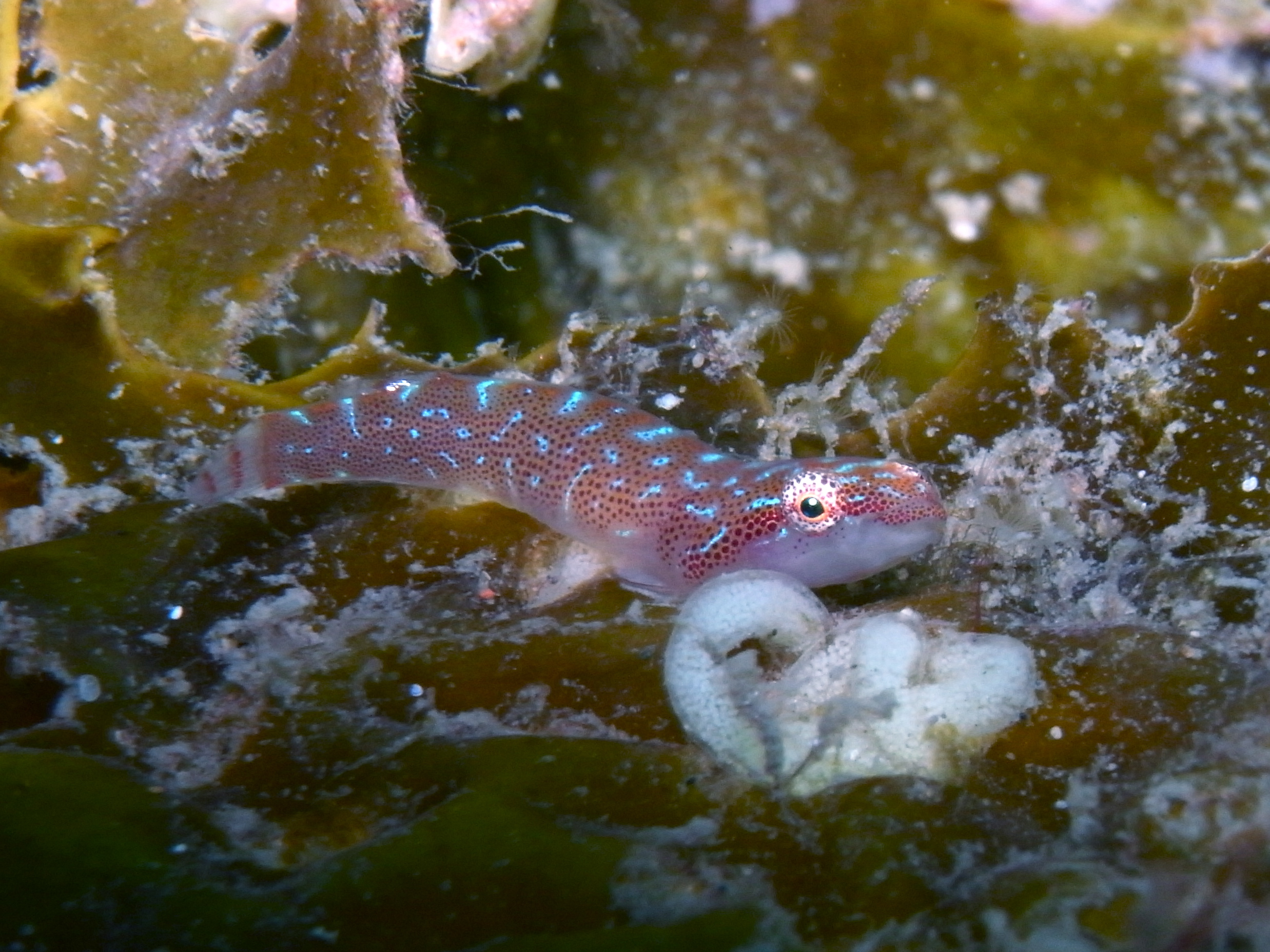
- Gobiesox rhessodon (top left) is a typical, cryptic clingfish.
- Lepadogaster purpurea (top right) has two eyespots on top of its head.
- Diademichthys lineatus (bottom left) has a striped disruptive pattern that may function as camouflage when between sea urchin spines, but may also be warning colours as it is poisonous
- Cochleoceps orientalis (bottom right) is a quite brightly coloured cleaner fish.

Most clingfish species have a cryptic colouration, often brown, grey, whitish, black, reddish or green shades, and in some cases they can rapidly change colour to match their background.

Species of deep water are often orange-red (these long wave-length colours are the first that disappear with depth, making them suitable for camouflage). Diademichthys lineatus, Discotrema species, Lepadichthys caritus and L. lineatus are strongly banded, which may function as a disruptive pattern when among sea urchin spines or crinoid arms, but may also be warning colours, as some members of these genera have poisonous skin and mucus (it is unknown if all of them are poisonous). There are species with colours or patterns that are unsuitable for camouflage. Although Lepadogaster purpurea overall is cryptic, it has a pair of distinct large eyespots on the top of its head. Cochleoceps bicolor, C. orientalis and Diplecogaster tonstricula are yellow to red with fine bluish lines. These three are cleaner fish.

== Feeding ==
Feeding varies depending on exact clingfish species. Most primarily feed on tiny crustaceans (such as amphipods, copepods, isopods, mysids, ostracods and shrimp) or gastropods (limpets and other sea snails). Other small animals that have been recorded in their diet include chitons, bivalves, medium-small crustacean like crabs and barnacles, sea urchins, worms, insect larvae, fish and fish eggs. In some species, cannibalism where a large clingfish eats a smaller clingfish is not uncommon.

Limpets and other shelled invertebrates are well-protected and often strongly attached to the rock surface. Clingfish species that feed extensively on them have developed specialized teeth and techniques to dislodge them. This includes rapidly inserting their relatively large, fang-like front teeth under the edge of the prey to flip it, or jamming the teeth on or under the shell's edge to make a small break. However, the teeth of clingfish vary extensively depending on species. In the opposite extreme of the species with relatively few large teeth is Nettorhamphos radula. This species has 1,800–2,300 microscopic teeth (about ten times more than known from any other clingfish), but its feeding behavior is unknown.

Three clingfish species, Cochleoceps bicolor, C. orientalis and Diplecogaster tonstricula, have become cleaner fish. Large fish approach them and allow the small clingfish onto their body where the clingfish eats tiny parasites. In contrast to this mutualistic relationship, certain clingfish species that live among the spines of sea urchins appear to be part of a more varied relationship. It can be either commensal (the clingfish gains protection from the sea urchin spines, but apparently neither benefits nor is a disadvantage to the sea urchin) or parasitic (the clingfish gains protection, and eats tube feet and pedicellaria from its sea urchin host).

No clingfish species is known to be exclusively herbivorous, but some are omnivorous and will feed extensively on a range of algae (brown, green and red), while other, more strictly carnivorous species may ingest plant material incidentally.

== Classification and taxonomy ==
The classification of the clingfishes varies. FishBase places Gobiesocidae as the only family in the order Gobiesociformes, under the superorder Paracanthopterygii; whereas ITIS place them in the suborder Gobiesocoidei of the order Perciformes, under superorder Acanthopterygii. ITIS lists Gobiesociformes as invalid. The 5th edition of Fishes of the World places the Gobiesociiformes in the clade Percomorpha as part of the series Ovalentaria.

Mostly being very small and often cryptic, new species are regularly discovered and described. A major authoritative work on the family is a monograph that was published in 1955 by J.C. Briggs, but in the half century after its publication, up until 2006, fifty-six new clingfish species were described, or on average more than one per year. This pattern with regular descriptions of new species—and even new genera—has continued since then. As of 2020, there are 182 recognized clingfish species.

=== Subfamilies and genera ===
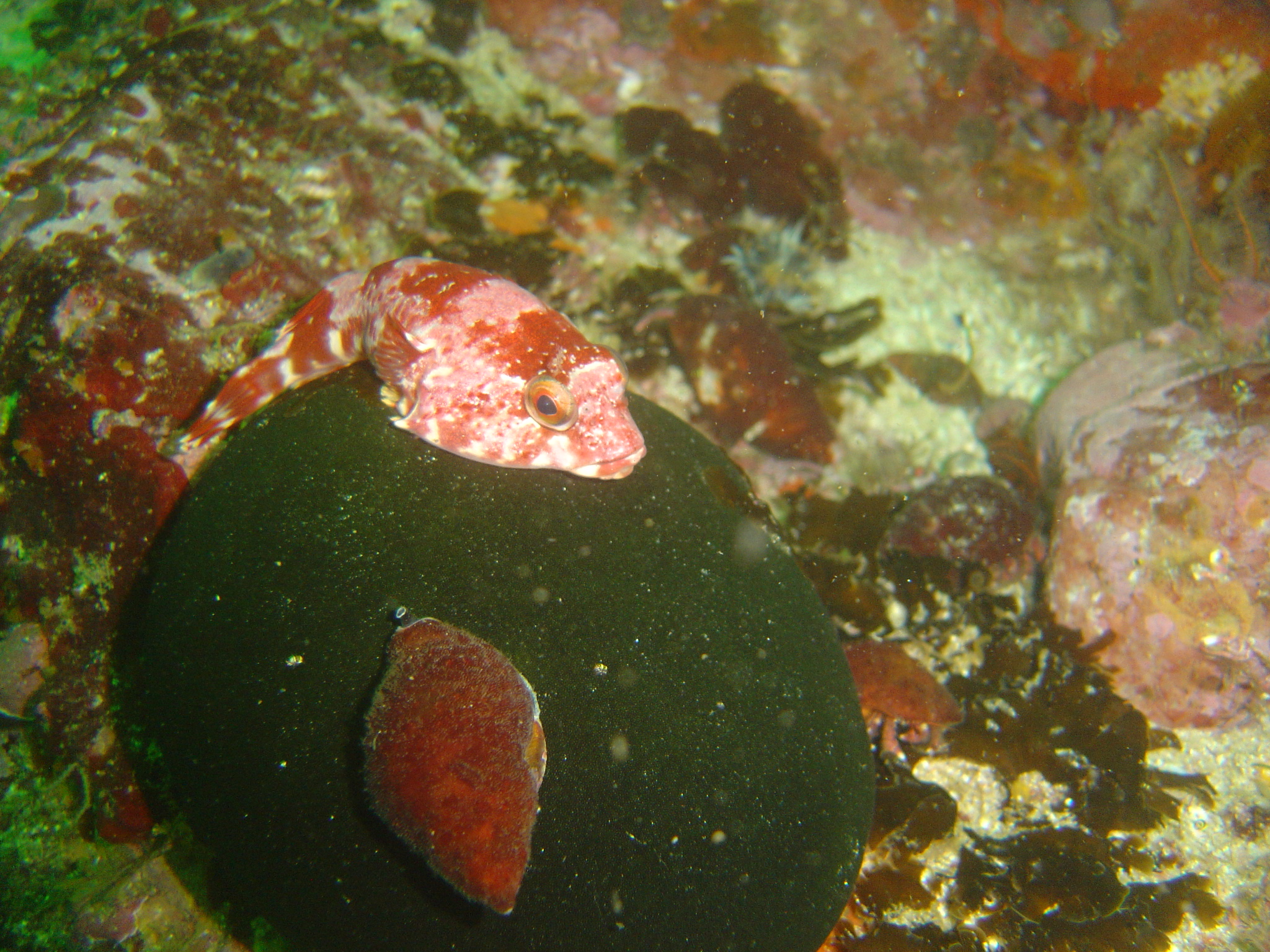
Chorisochismus dentex is the only member of its genus and the largest clingfish species

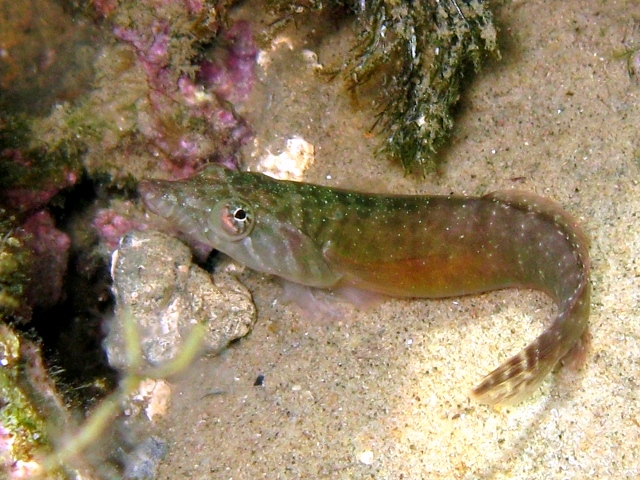
The Connemara clingfish is typically referred to as Lepadogaster candolii, but genetic studies indicate that this makes the genus Lepadogaster polyphyletic

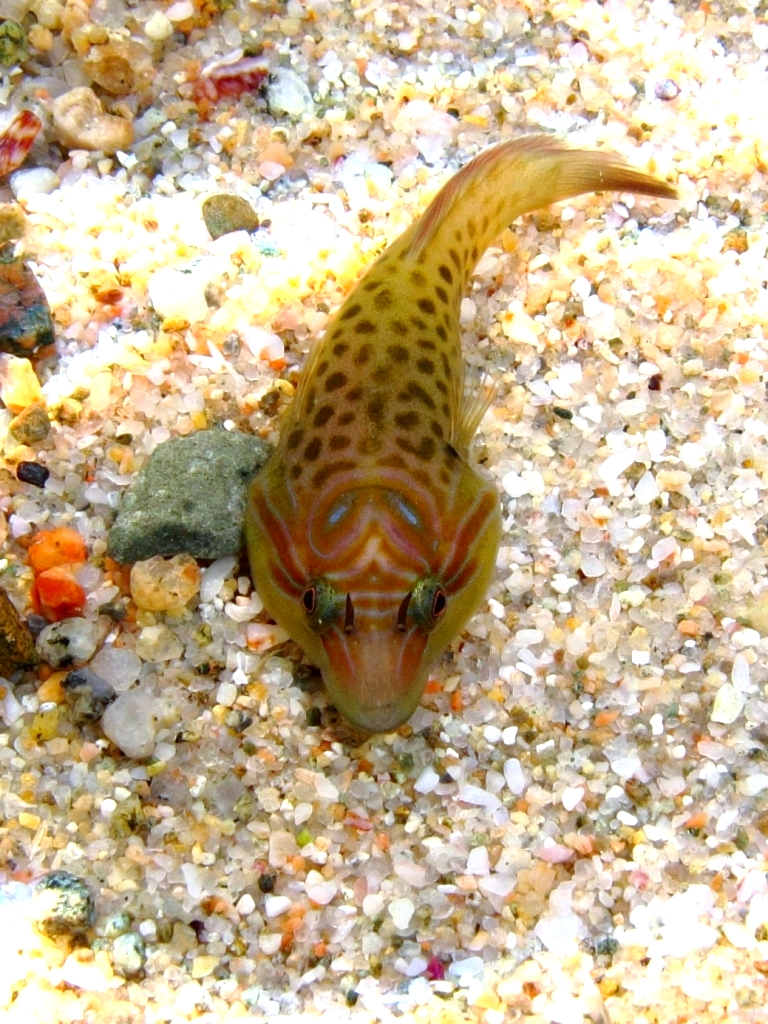
Lepadogaster lepadogaster (shown) and L. purpurea were formerly considered a single species. Both inhabit the Mediterranean and the East Atlantic, but only L. purpurea ranges north to the British Isles

Subfamilies and genera. The delimination of the subfamilies, and to some extent the genera, is not fully resolved. The 5th edition of Fishes of the World recognises only two subfamilies, Cheilobranchinae and Gobiesocinae. Fishbase does list a third subfamily, the monotypic Protogobiesocinae which contains a single species Protogobiesox asymmetricus, this species having been described in 2016. In 2020 the systematics of Gobiesocidae was reviewed and nine subfamilies were proposed: Cheilobranchinae, Chorisochisminae, Diademichthyinae, Diplocrepinae, Haplocylicinae, Gobiesocinae, Lepadogastrinae, Protogobiesocinae, and Trachelochisminae.

Subfamily Cheilobranchinae

- Alabes Cloquet, 1816
- Barryichthys Conway, Moore & Summers, 2019
- Cochleoceps Whitley, 1943
- Nettorhamphos Conway, Moore & Summers, 2017
- Parvicrepis Whitley, 1931
- Posidonichthys Briggs, 1993

Subfamily Chorisochisminae

- Chorisochismus Brisout de Barneville, 1846
- Eckloniaichthys Smith, 1943

Subfamily Diademichthyinae

- Aspasma Jordan & Fowler, 1902
- Aspasmichthys Briggs, 1955
- Aspasmodes Smith, 1957
- Diademichthys Pfaff, 1942
- Discotrema Briggs, 1976
- Erdmannichthys Conway, Fujiwara, Motomura & Summers, 2021
- Flabellicauda Fujiwara, Conway & Motomura, 2021
- Flexor Conway, Stewart & Summers, 2018
- Lepadichthys Waite, 1904
- Lepadicyathus Prokofiev, 2005
- Liobranchia Briggs, 1955
- Lissonanchus Smith, 1966
- Pherallodus Briggs, 1955
- Pherallodichthys Shiogaki & Dotsu, 1983
- Propherallodus Shiogaki & Dotsu, 1983
- Rhinolepadichthys Fujiwara, Motomura, Summers & Conway, 2024

Subfamily Diplocrepinae

- Diplocrepis Günther, 1861

Subfamily Gobiesocinae

- Acyrtops Schultz, 1951
- Acyrtus Schultz, 1944
- Arcos Schultz, 1944
- Derilissus Briggs, 1969
- Gobiesox Lacepède, 1800
- Rimicola Jordan & Evermann, 1896
- Sicyases Müller & Troschel, 1843
- Tomicodon Brisout de Barneville, 1846

Subfamily Haplocylicinae

- Gastrocyathus Briggs, 1955
- Gastrocymba Briggs, 1955
- Gastroscyphus Briggs, 1955
- Haplocylix Briggs, 1955

Subfamily Lepadogastrinae

- Apletodon Briggs, 1955
- Diplecogaster Fraser-Brunner, 1938
- Gouania Nardo, 1833
- Lepadogaster Goüan, 1770
- Lecanogaster Briggs, 1957
- Opeatogenys Briggs, 1955

Subfamily Protogobiesocinae

- Protogobiesox Fricke, Chen & Chen, 2016
- Gymnoscyphus Böhlke & Robins, 1970
- Kopua Hardy, 1984

Subfamily Trachelochisminae

- Dellichthys Briggs, 1955
- Trachelochismus Brisout de Barneville, 1846

Incertae Sedis

- Aspasmogaster Waite, 1907
- Conidens Briggs, 1955
- Creocele Briggs, 1955
- Modicus Hardy, 1983
