= John Carmon Briggs =

American ichthyologist (1920–2018)

- Born: April 9, 1920; Portland, Oregon, U.S.
- Died: May 5, 2018 (aged 98); Santa Rosa, California, U.S.
- Education: Stanford University (Ph.D., 1952)
- Known for: Descriptions of new fish species
- Scientific career
- Fields: Ichthyology, Evolutionary biology
- Workplaces: Stanford University; University of Florida; University of British Columbia; University of Texas, Institute of Marine Science; University of South Florida; Georgia Museum of Natural History

John Carmon Briggs, often written as John C. Briggs (April 9, 1920 – May 5, 2018) was an American ichthyologist and evolutionary biologist. He was the author of descriptions of several new species of fish.

== Biography ==
Briggs was born in 1920 in Portland, Oregon. In 1952, he received his Ph.D. from Stanford University.

From 1950 to 1951, he worked as a staff biologist for the California Department of Fish and Wildlife. Between 1952 and 1954, he was a research fellow at the Natural History Museum of Stanford University in California. From 1954 to 1958, he served as an assistant professor of biology at the University of Florida, and from 1958 to 1961 as an assistant professor of zoology at the University of British Columbia in Vancouver, Canada.

From 1961 to 1964, he was a research fellow at the Institute of Marine Science, University of Texas. From 1964 to 1990, Briggs was professor of marine science at the University of South Florida, where he became professor emeritus in 1992. Since 1991, he has been a research fellow at the Georgia Museum of Natural History.

Briggs died on May 5, 2018, at the age of 98.
