= Marine life of New York–New Jersey Harbor Estuary =

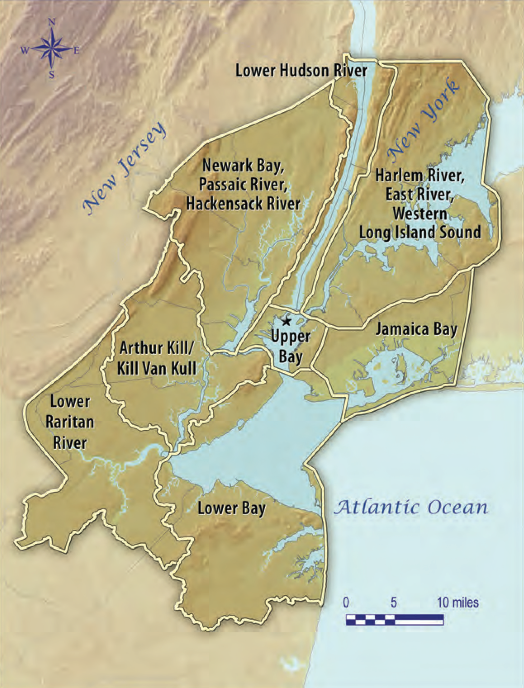
USACE harbor estuary map 2016

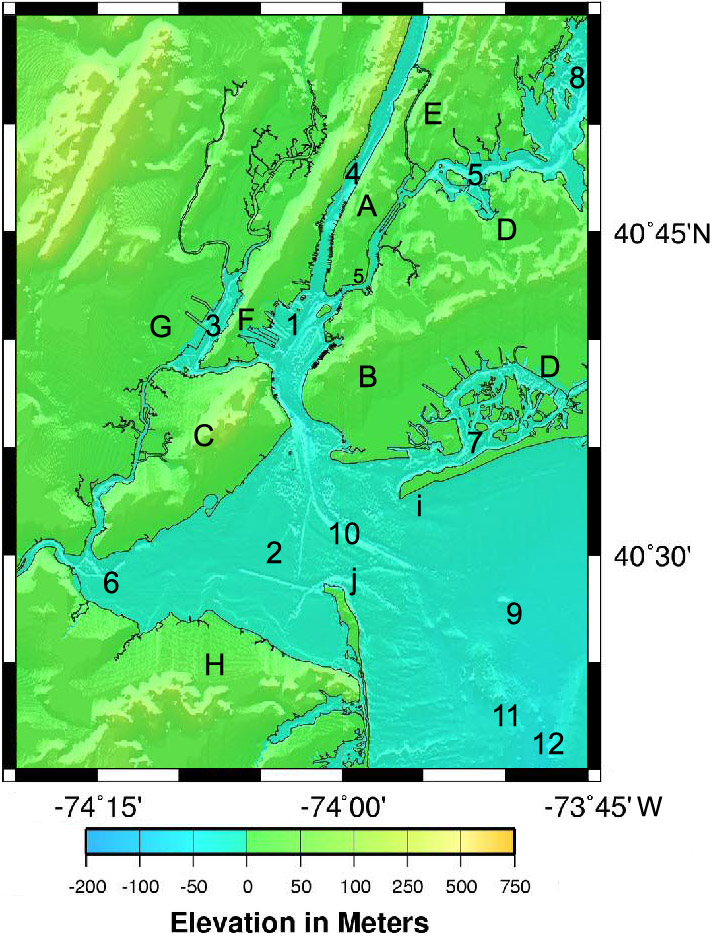

The New York–New Jersey Harbor Estuary has a variety of flora and fauna. Much of the harbor originally consisted of tidal marshes that have been dramatically transformed by the development of port facilities. The estuary itself supports a great variety of thriving estuarine aquatic species; contrary to popular stereotypes, New York Harbor and its adjacent, interdependent waters are very much alive, and steadily recovering from pollution; ecologically it is true that these waters were once dead or extremely toxic but after 45 years of cleaning the estuary is in a much better state than it has been in a hundred years. Tidal flow occurs as far north as Troy, over 150 miles away. The salt front (dilute salt water) can reach Poughkeepsie in drought conditions and is present in the lower reaches of the Raritan River for most of the year.

== Animal species ==
=== Arthropods ===
- American lobster (Homarus americanus) - Massachusetts Bay is not the only home of the lobster on the East Coast. Usually found south of the Verrazzano Bridge, near the Southwestern end of Long Island and just off Sandy Hook. Often attracted to artificial reefs found near Lower New York Bay, where they can reach very large sizes, and just offshore near Ocean County, New Jersey. Depredation by man within the New York-New Jersey Harbor Estuary is extremely rare. Some specimens can be as long as a man's arm.
- Atlantic rock crab (Cancer irroratus) - A common crab found on the continental shelf within ten miles of shoreline. Found in all parts of the estuary. There is some concern over it competing with the invasive European green crab for habitat, but it is believed that the presence of Callinectes genera in the bight may offer some refuge as it has been shown that the swimmer crabs of this genus like to prey upon the smaller green crab.
- Blue crab (Callinectes sapidus) - Also known as the blue claw crab. The crabs are typically found in the mouth of the Hudson River and occasionally wander into the brackish waters of small rivers and coves that pepper the western side of Long Island, including the waters just off Coney Island. Up the Hudson they are found occasionally in the part of the river that runs through the lower Hudson Valley in the summertime. Up until the 1960s they could be eaten, but the State of New York currently recommends against attempting to do so on a regular basis, due to bioaccumulation of PCBs and cadmium that were discovered in the crabs in the 1970s. On the upside, a lack of hunting by man has caused this crab's numbers to grow heartily while others (Chesapeake Bay) have decreased. Females bearing eggs should be let go immediately because if they are not it affects the next generation.
- Ghost crab (Ocypode quadrata) - Common sight after twilight scurrying along the beaches of western Long Island and the planktonic larvae are found throughout the estuary.
- Atlantic horseshoe crab (Limulus polyphemus) - A common visitor to Breezy Point, Rockaways, and Coney Island. Numbers in peril but not yet a candidate as an endangered species. The New York Horseshoe Crab Monitoring Network conducts a citizen science annual census at different sites.
- Lady crab (Ovalipes ocellatus)
- Portly spider crab (Libinia emarginata) A species of decorator crab. Like most spider crab It is edible though rarely in the USA on account of appearance.
- Ivory barnacle (Amphibalanus eburneus)
- Northern rock barnacle (Semibalanus balanoides)
- Asian shore crab (Hemigraspus sanguineus) An invasive alien species that is a favorite food of seagulls and other shorebirds in the area.
- Common Spider Crab (Libinia emarginata)
- Green Crab (Carcinus maenus) This species is an invasive species originally from Europe that has been present in all waters of the State of New York for many decades. It is a swimmer crab that is present in most parts of the harbor and is easily distinguished from the blue crab by being much smaller and a dull green color.
- Black fingered mud crab (Panopeus herbstii)
- Gammarid Amphipod (Family Gammaridae)
- Corophid amphipod (Family Corophiidae)
- Skeleton Shrimp (Family Caprellida)
- Shore Shrimp, Grass Shrimp (Palaemonetes spp.)
- Sea Roach (Family idoteidae)
- White fingered mud crab (Rhithropanopeus harrisii)

=== Chordates ===
==== Birds ====
Although not aquatic animals, these birds are supported by the food and habitat the harbor provides, particularly Jamaica Bay and the Pelham Islands. Many of these birds will fly within sight of the Manhattan skyline and the estuary is a very important point for the East Coast because of its location: it is dead center in the Atlantic Flyway and many raptors and waterfowl use this spot as a rest area along their journey from New England and Canada in fall before heading further south to the Southern States and the Caribbean, reversing the journey in late March and early April.

- American herring gull (Larus smithsonianus) A common sight that is present almost year round. Some will nest on the many tall buildings afforded in all five boroughs, none of which is more than a few miles from the water.
- American oystercatcher (Haematopus pallatius)
- American wigeon (Anas americana)
- Bald eagle (Halieeatus leucocephalus) - Has been seen up the Hudson River every winter consistently for well over a decade, feeding on a wide variety of both freshwater and saltwater fish. Has also been seen using the New Jersey Palisades and piers near the Harlem River as a perch from which to swoop down and grab its quarry in the estuary. Will occasionally make itself known in the Lower Harbor seeking schools of mackerel.
- Black bellied plover (Pluvialis squatarola)
- Black-crowned night heron (Nycticorax nycticorax)
- Black skimmer (Rynchops niger)
- Brant (Branta bernicla hrota)
- Brown pelican (Pelecanus occidentalis) This bird migrates north from the Chesapeake and Outer Banks in the late spring and does not go back until roughly late September. Occasionally will perch on docks. Prefers alewives and mossbunker; should not be fed so much as a morsel if found on the docks as it can become habituated to humans and an unhealthy diet.
- Canada goose (Branta canadensis)
- Glossy ibis (Plegadis falcinellus) A common bird in the summertime in Jamaica Bay and in the shallows on the Pelham Islands.
- Great blue heron (Ardea herodia) Often found on Staten Island near the water.
- Green heron (Butorides virescens) Will take to feeding in the Bronx River in summertime. Also found occasionally in Jamaica Bay and marshy portions on the New Jersey side of the estuary, attracted by small fish.
- Mallard (Anas platyryncha) The most common dabbling duck in the region. A common visitor to brackish portions of the lower Raritan as well as Staten Island.
- Northern gannet (Morus bassanus) A member of the booby family. Will dive head first into the water after fish.
- Osprey (Pandion haliaetus) - A very common sight in the skies over western Long Island, especially during the nesting months. Easily seen near Jamaica Bay.
- Piping plover (Charadrius melodus)-A bird that likes to nest on beaches like the ones near Rockaways and the Pelham Islands. This plover in particular is very tiny and beachgoers must mind their step near sand dunes as they can be missed. Has a pleasant sounding call. Likes to nest on sandy beaches and can be difficult to see during nesting season, as it tries to camouflage itself. This is a very nervous, endangered species that must remain unmolested during nesting as it will abandon its eggs if stressed; birdwatchers are advised to remain very, very quiet and to maintain a long distance from the nest so as not to frighten the bird.
- Red knot (Calidris canutus rufa) The estuary is a place where the red knot likes to rest as it migrated back to its breeding grounds in the Arctic. Small flocks can be seen in the spring and early summer. This bird's numbers are threatened, and so it must remain undisturbed.
- Snowy egret (Egretta thula) A common visitor to streams and salt marshes in the summer. Will on rare occasions be found foraging and relaxing in parks and rivers in the estuary system like the Bronx River. Males have very distinct breeding plumage.
- Yellow-crowned night heron (Nycticorax violaceus) - Nests on some of the uninhabited islands in the harbor and feasts upon the fish in the ocean and frogs in the streams and ponds in parks.

==== Fish ====
- Alewife (Alosa pseudoharengus)
- American anglerfish (Lophius americanus) Easily the homeliest fish in the water; Prefers the deepest parts of the estuary and Sandy Hook. Sold in local farmer's markets as monkfish, even though it is not a monkfish in strictu senso.
- American butterfish (Peprilus triacanthus)
- American eel (Anguilla rostrata)-Numbers are low; currently on IUCN redlist. Should gently put back exactly where it was found and not bought from any vendor nor taken home to eat anywhere in New York or New Jersey. Will travel thousands of miles to reproduce in Sargasso Sea every year. The Hudson River is a known haunt of this fish as is Upper New York Bay.
- American shad (Alosa sapidissima) Anadromous fish that once was found as far inland as Bridgewater New Jersey and a former abundant resident of the Raritan River showing signs of returning.
- American silver perch (Bairdiella chrysoura)
- Atlantic croaker (Micropogonias undulatus)
- Atlantic herring (Clupea harengus)
- Atlantic menhaden (Brevoortia tyrannus)-Also known as mossbunker. This fish is a success story. In the 1940s and 1950s, the waters of the Estuary were very badly polluted and had been polluted since at least the mid 19th century. By the time of the Clean Water Act, the waters surrounding New York City were ecologically dead or dying. As of 2018, however, the water is clean enough to support this fish in obscenely large numbers, which have in turn triggered the return of whales, dolphins, and sharks to the harbor.
- Atlantic moonfish (Selene setapinnis) Likes to school in large numbers.
- Atlantic needlefish (Strongylura marina)
- Atlantic silverside (Menidia menidia)
- Atlantic sturgeon (Acipenser oxyrinchus) - Found in the depths of Upper New York Bay, in the main channel of the Hudson River; it also can and does migrate long distances from the mouth of the Hudson. This fish is very large as an adult and can grow to 14 feet long. It should be put back at once if caught on a line and the state environmental authorities should be contacted, with a photograph if possible. The Atlantic sturgeon is an endangered fish that has been the victim of overfishing for caviar as well as the alteration of its habitat in too many rivers along the East Coast. The Hudson River and the New York-New Jersey Harbor Estuary is a clear nursery for this fish as well as a stronghold for the species overall: the most recent research suggests that the remaining populations in other rivers in other states are interconnected with New York's, evidenced by tracking devices. Other populations in Europe were, at one point, completely wiped out.
- Banded killifish (Fundulus diaphanus)
- Bay anchovy (Anchoa mitchilli)
- Black drum (Pogonias cromis)
- Black seabass (Centropristis striata)
- Blueback herring (Alosa aestivalis)
- Bluefish (Pomatomus saltatrix)
- Cunner (Tautogolabrus adspersus)
- Crevalle jack (Caranx hippos)
- Foureye butterflyfish (Chaetodon capistratus)
- Fourspot flounder (Hippoglossina oblonga)
- Gizzard shad (Dorosoma cepedianum)
- Hogchoker (Trinectes maculatus)
- Lined seahorse (Hippocampus erectus) Found all over the harbor and Sandy Hook. A species that should be gently put back exactly where it was found if caught, or as close to seagrass as possible. Numbers are threatened by collectors seeking Traditional Chinese Medicine. Should not be purchased at all from such vendors.
- Mummichog (Fundulus heteroclitus)
- Northern pipefish (Syngnathus fuscus)
- Northern sea robin (Prionotus carolinus)
- Northern puffer (Sphoeroides maculatus) -A member of the blowfish family. Also known as a sugar toad. This is one of the only members of the blowfish family that is nowhere near as toxic as its Japanese and Chinese relatives. However, trying to catch this fish let alone eat it is dangerous as it can be mistaken for at least five other blowfish native to the Western Atlantic, two of which occasionally leave their normal ranges in warm weather and wind up in New York. Each of these lookalikes have an extremely deadly toxin in their flesh that humans cannot taste or smell. Techniques sushi chefs use on preparing fugu will not work with these fish since they are a different species with the poison in different parts and it is imperative that all New Yorkers and New Jerseyans know the source of the catch when eating in Asian restaurants, where immigrant owners might not be aware of the difference.
- Ocean sunfish (Mola mola) This fish can grow to gigantic sizes. May be found near entrance to Lower New York Bay. Very docile in spite of enormous size; it resembles a giant floating pancake with fins and will from time to time float near the surface.
- Oyster toadfish (Opsanus tau) Very commonly found haunting the piers and docks.
- Red hake (Urophycis chuss)
- Rough scad (Trachurus lathami)
- Sand lance (Ammodytes americanus). An important food source for harbor seals and grey seals as well as many baleen whales. Found in New York Bight as well as the estuary on the seabed.
- Scup (Stenatomus chrysops)
- Shortnose sturgeon (Acipenser brevirostrum) Another dweller in the Hudson and East River. Smaller than its cousin the Atlantic sturgeon, though juveniles look similar. Should be put back where it was found if caught as it was placed on the Endangered Species List in 1967 and still is vulnerable. Spawning should occur around April.
- Silver hake (Merluccius bilinearis)
- Skillet fish (Gobiesox strumosus)
- Smallmouth flounder (Etropus microstomus)
- Striped bass (Morone saxatilis) - One of the most prevalent species in the harbor, and the most extensively fished one. The Hudson River Estuary system has been a nursery for stripers going back before European settlement and overall it is one of the most important breeding grounds for this species in the Northeast.
- Striped burrfish (Chilomycterus schoepfi) -A member of the blowfish family, but very different looking than any relative in the area owing to the spikes on its skin when it blows up. Hazardous to step on. Present in the harbor in late summer.
- Striped sea robin (Prionotus evolans)
- Striped mullet (Mugil cephalus)
- Summer flounder (Paralicthys dentatus)
- Tautog (Tautoga onitis) Locally known also as the blackfish. Attracted to artificial reefs and natural shoals in the estuary.
- Tomcod (Microgadus tomcod)
- Weakfish (Cynoscion regalis)
- White mullet (Mugil curema)
- White perch (Morone americana)
- Windowpane flounder (Scophthalmus aquosus)
- Winter flounder (Pleuronectes americanus)
- Yellowtail flounder (Limanda ferruginea)

==== Elasmobranch Fish: Sharks, Skates, And Rays ====
Despite popular belief, sharks are perfectly capable of living in the waters of the estuary as well as the deeper waters near Sandy Hook. This would include the very small species to the giants, with 25 of them being recorded as indigenous to the waters of New York State in total. They were once fairly common to the estuary, as evidenced by records left behind by the Dutch describing them in a way that is unmistakable for any other family of fish, and cousins of sharks like the skates and rays never totally went extinct in the waters off New York or New Jersey. Among the rays and sharks, there are many nomadic species that migrate.

The overwhelming majority of sharks have no interest in hunting humans, as there is plenty of prey available for them to hunt in the nearby waters. Larger species of shark prefer seals, dolphins, and large fish like tuna and billfish, which are found in the waters around the estuary. Most shark species are not known to prey on humans, with increased attacks occurring when natural prey is scarce. The New York Bight, the triangle of water with Montauk at one apex, the Jersey Shore at the second apex, and New York Harbor in the middle, is known for its abundance of marine life, thus providing a large amount of prey for sharks. The exact migration pattern is not completely known and currently being studied, but the general belief is that the larger pelagic sharks migrate north in the spring and return again to Florida and Georgia by the end of November as the water becomes too cold to be bearable. The waters in this area are also a haven for the larger species whose numbers are threatened as shark finning is forbidden by the State of New York.

- Basking shark (Cetorhinus maximus) Second largest species of shark in the world, but this shark is a filter feeder and not a predator. It can be mistaken for the great white owing to similar coloring, but has gill slits that slash almost around its whole head and has a front dorsal fin that is more triangular than the raked shape found in that of the great white.
- Blue shark Prionace glauca Not an aggressive species in particular with few records of attacks to its name, but a larger species. Can grow to ten feet long and has a slender build.
- Bull shark Historically responsible for an incident in Matawan, New Jersey in 1916 that inspired the film Jaws, this species is known to be more and aggressive than the larger great white, which cannot survive in fresh water. Bull sharks can swim up freshwater rivers and are present in the area from May–September.
- Great white shark (Carcharodon carcharias) One of the largest living species of shark that can grow to about 20 feet long, with average lengths of 15-16 ft. for females, and 11-13 for males. As of 2018, research indicates the return of this most feared shark. In 2016, scientists discovered what is thought to be a white shark nursery off Montauk, where a large number of juveniles indicates a nearby nursery. The great white can reach the other end of Long Island (Brooklyn and Queens) within a matter of 24 hours. Great whites are categorized as vulnerable and should not be hunted.
- Nurse shark (Ginglymostoma cirratum) Will occasionally visit artificial reefs.
- Sandbar shark (Carcharhinus plumbeus) Common near Sandy Hook. Growing presence nearer to New York City.
- Sand tiger shark (Carcharias taurus) New York Harbor is an important nursery for the babies.
- Scalloped hammerhead (Sphyrna lewini). Mature females grow to about 13 feet long. This species is rarely aggressive and mostly bites out of fear. The young of this species will form schools in estuaries. Babies are often caught in New York Harbor.
- Shortfin mako shark (Isurus oxyrinchus) May be dangerous to divers. Like the bull shark, they are ambush predators. The waters of the New York Bight and New York Harbor are naturally cloudy. This shark species is categorized as endangered and is threatened by shark finning and overfishing.

Rays

Cownose ray (Rhinoptera bonasus)

==== Mammals ====
All marine mammals are protected under the Marine Mammals Protection Act of 1972.

- Bottlenose dolphin (Tursiops truncatus)
- Grey seal (Halichoerus gryphus) Can be distinguished from the harbor seal by its larger size, W-shaped nostrils, and preference to lay flopped out with its back flippers down when resting out of the water. Will rest on jetties.
- Harbor seal (Phoca vitulina) - Historically both pinniped species were abundant natives in the harbor until hunting and other human activity extirpated them from the area by at least the late 19th century: there is a section of the harbor that was historically known as "Robbins Reef. " Robyn is the Dutch word for seal, proving their existence long before the American Revolution. In recent years, however, these two species, along with the some more typically northerly seal species like the harp seal have been found in the harbor in pursuit of some of the species mentioned above; others are yearlings who are continuing the trend on the U.S. East Coast of seals reclaiming former habitat, heading southward from mother populations in New England and Canada and from more easterly parts of Long Island. Colonies of harbor seals and greys are increasing their numbers with every passing year and will be seen in the area from December through April. Occasionally this species will swim upstream in the Hudson River.
- Harbor porpoise (Phocoena phocoena) - Has been seen in Upper New York Bay.
- North American river otter (Lutra canadensis) - Native to the Hudson River and occasionally is seen at the mouth of the river. Restoration efforts by the state of New York are underway and appear to be successful.

Whales

All whales that visit the estuary are wild animals; many, like the humpback, may be mothers with calves. The water from their blowholes will usually be visible long before the rest of the body is. They will defend themselves vigorously and violently if they believe they or their babies are in danger. A recommended distance of at least 100 yards must be maintained between a vessel and the whale, and pursuing one when it does not seek contact is illegal. It is not unknown for some species to be inquisitive and should the whale approach willingly, the boatmen must turn off the engine and give the beast a way out so that if the whale feels uneasy, it can leave.

- Blue whale (Balaenoptera musculus) The largest of all whale species, and one of the rarest. Can be found just off Sandy Hook.
- Fin whale (Balaenoptera physalus) The second largest species of whale. Will enter the Upper Harbor and has been seen off Coney Island. This is the fastest swimming whale found in the estuary.
- Humpback whale (Megaptera novaeangliae) Among whales, one of the most common visitors to the Harbor as of 2018. Records going back over 300 years are very clear that whales were present in the area in historical times and only disappeared after the water became saturated with the garbage of humans. Usually humpbacks appear in the harbor around April and will not leave until late October: New York City and its surrounding waters are dead in the middle of their migration route, a huge territory that begins in Newfoundland, runs through New England, passes into the waters of Florida and the American South, and terminates in a strait between Puerto Rico and the Dominican Republic. The estuary is an excellent pit stop for mother whales wanting to teach their calves how to catch the fish that have returned in numbers not seen in over a century. In 2017 one humpback whale made international news when it breached in front of a camera less than a few miles from Battery Park and raised awareness that whales have "come home" at last to New York.
- Minke whale (Balaenoptera acutorostrata)
- North Atlantic right whale (Eubalaena glacialis) Extremely endangered. Less than 400 are left in the world. New York and New Jersey are in the center of its migration route between Florida and the Bay of Fundy in Canada. Great care must be taken around this species of whale as most cannot outswim jet propelled boats and are frequent victims of ship strikes. All sightings should be reported to authorities like the Coast Guard or NYPD at once, for every member of this species is precious to its continued survival.

From 2007-2009, an expert from Cornell University did an experiment listening in on the acoustics of the Harbor Estuary, where, to the astonishment of many, he discovered at least six species of whale vocalizing less than 20 miles from where the Statue of Liberty stands, just past the Verrazzano Bridge where the water gets deeper. Historical records show that whales were plentiful in the area going well back into colonial history: in 1697, the charter for Trinity Church received its official royal charter, which gave it not only a large chunk of land in Lower Manhattan, but also the profit from any whales or shipwrecks along the banks of the Hudson. The return of these whales is evidence of the environment's improvement over the past forty years: whales have been absent from New York's waters west of the Hamptons for over a hundred years as the water became incredibly polluted and in 1989 the population was zero. In 2009, however, a young humpback whale attempted to penetrate the gateway to the upper harbor when it passed under the Verrazzano Bridge, causing the men and women ashore watching the whole debacle from Fort Hamilton a great deal of alarm, concerned for its health and the safety of the Coast Guard officers trying to herd the frightened, massive creature back out to sea (the whale returned unharmed.) In late 2017, for the first time, Woods Hole Oceanographic Institute in partnership with the New York Aquarium began to count the whales in a census as the population has expanded mightily.

==== Tunicates ====
- Golden star tunicate (Botryllus schlosseri)
- Chain tunicate (Botrylloides violaceus)
- Orange sheath tunicate (Botrylloides diegensis)
- Sea grapes (Molgula manhattensis)
- Sea vase (Ciona intestinalis)

=== Cnidarians ===
- Moon jellyfish (Aurelia aurita) A common sight that washes up on the shores of Rockaways, Queens every summer.
- Lion's mane jellyfish (Cynanea capillata) The largest known jellyfish. Prefers the deepest waters just past the Verrazzano Bridge and near Sandy Hook.
- White cross hydromedusa (Staurophora mertensi)
- Tubular hydroid (Ectopleura crocea)
- Orange-striped green sea anemone (Diadumene lineata)

==== Corals ====
- Northern cup coral (Astrangia poculata)

=== Echinoderms ===
- Atlantic starfish (Asterias forbesi)
- Northern sea star (Asterias vulgaris)
- Common sand dollar (Echinarachnius parma)

=== Mollusks ===
==== Bivalves ====
- Atlantic bay scallop (Aequipectin irradians)
- Atlantic jackknife clam (Ensis directus) Also known as a bamboo clam or razor clam.
- Atlantic ridged marsh mussel (Geukensia demissa)
- Atlantic strawberry cockle (Americardia media)
- Atlantic surf clam (Spisula solidissima) A species that is much prized as a food source. Very common near Sandy Hook.
- Blue mussel (Mytilus edulis)
- Coquina (Donax fossor) A very small species that is found where the tide meets the sand.
- Eastern oyster (Crassostrea virginica) - Once widely found through much of the harbor and a staple of the local diet from the time of the Algonquians up through the 19th century. Oystering grounds were prevalent in the Upper Bay, as well as along the south shore of Staten Island and Jamaica Bay. The oyster still exists in the harbor but is not yet considered edible; there are plans to further clean up the areas so that the beds can be restored.
- Quahog (Venus mercenaria)
- Steamer clam (Mya arenaria)

==== Cephalopods ====
- Longfin inshore squid (Loligo pealei) - Found in Lower New York Harbor and Sheepshead Bay. Often for sale in local farmers' markets.
- Common octopus

==== Gastropods ====
- Common whelk (Buccinum undatum)
- Channeled whelk (Busycon canaliculatum)
- Common periwinkle (Littorina littorea) - Almost certainly introduced in colonial times by the British as food and possibly in bilgewater from ships. Common sight clinging to rocks or wherever their favorite algae can grow.
- Eastern mudsnail (Ilanassa obsoleta)
- Oyster drill (Urosalpinx cinerea)
- Lightning whelk (Busycon carica) Found in Sandy Hook.
- Shark eye (Neverita duplicata)

=== Annelida ===
- Hard tube worms (Serpulid and Spirorbid worms)
- Clam worm (Nereis spp.)

=== Porifera ===
- Red beard sponge (Clathria prolifera)

=== Bryozoans ===
- Lacy Bryozoan (Membranipora membranacea)
- Orange Bryozoan (Watersipora subtorquata)
- Brown Bushy Bryozoan (Bulgula neritina)

=== Algae ===
- Sea lettuce (Ulva lactuca)
- Hollow Green Weed (Enteromorphia spp.)
- Sour Weeds (Desmarestia spp.)

== See also ==
- Geography of New York–New Jersey Harbor Estuary
