= Clathria toxistricta =

Scientific classification
- Kingdom: Animalia
- Phylum: Porifera
- Class: Demospongiae
- Order: Poecilosclerida
- Family: Microcionidae
- Genus: Clathria
- Subgenus: Clathria
- Species: C. toxistricta

Binomial name
- Clathria toxistricta Topsent, 1925

Species of sea sponge

Clathria toxistricta, also known as Clathria (Clathria) toxistricta, is a species of sea sponge in the family Microcionidae. It was described by Émile Topsent in 1925.

It is described by Lévi, 1960 as follows: Red, plate-like sponge, approximately one centimeter thick, with a reticulated framework of multi-spiculated fibers and unispiculated secondary fibers.

Spicules: Primary acanthostyles, slightly curved, often smooth, with a barely marked base: 145-245 μm x 6-10 μm. Accessory acanthostyles, conical and straight with small spines more abundant in the distal half: 80-115 μm x 6 μm. Auxiliary subtylostrongyles, slightly curved, smooth, few in number: 210-250 μm x 1.5-2 μm. Palmate isochelae, few in number. Toxas of fairly uniform size: 340-400 μm, rarely shorter: 110-220 μm, with very reduced central flexion.

Distribution: Naples (on Microcosmus).
