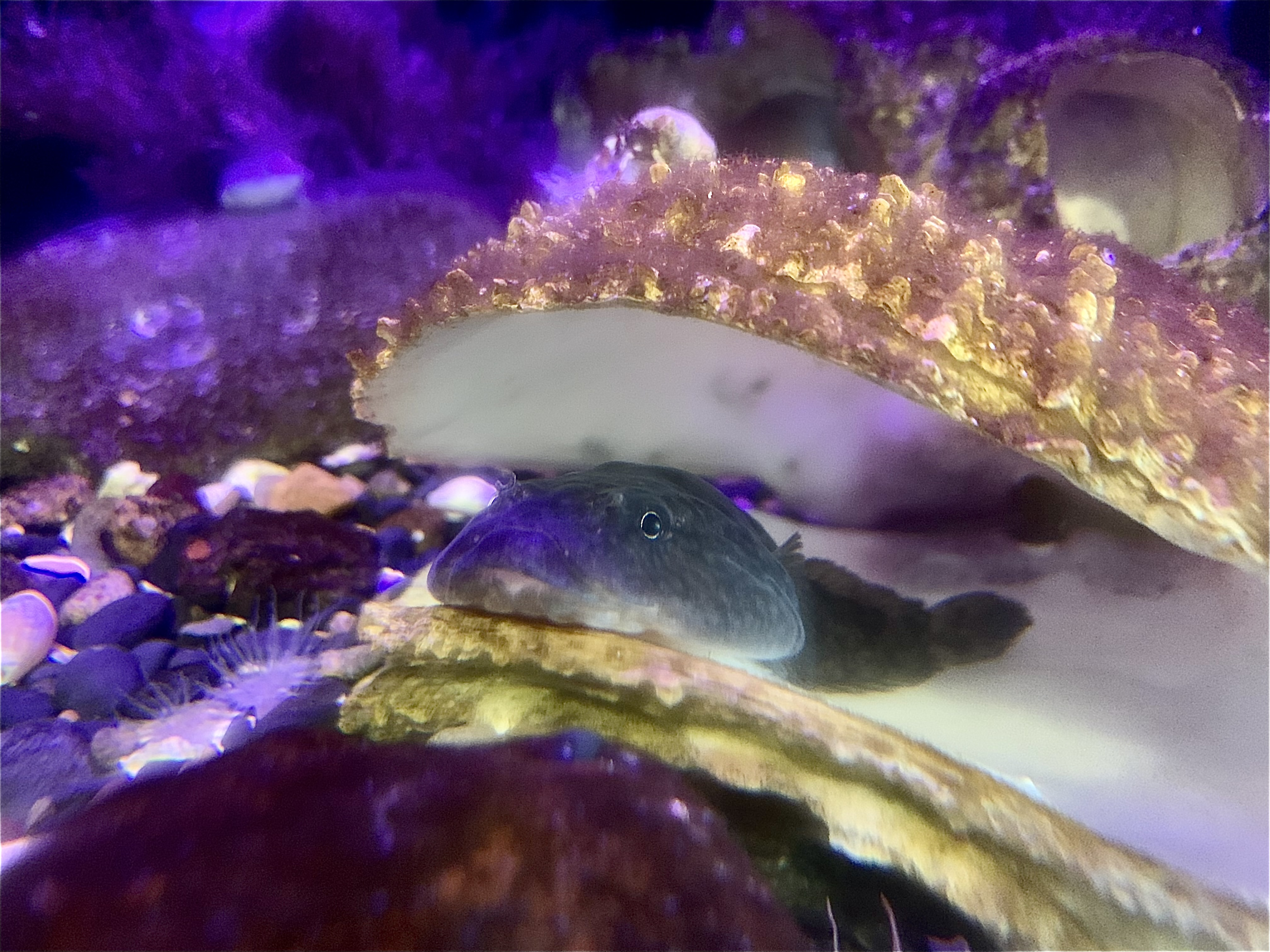

Conservation status
- Least Concern (IUCN 3.1)

Scientific classification
- Kingdom: Animalia
- Phylum: Chordata
- Class: Actinopterygii
- Order: Blenniiformes
- Family: Gobiesocidae
- Genus: Gobiesox
- Species: G. maeandricus

Binomial name
- Gobiesox maeandricus (Girard, 1858)

Synonyms
- Lepadogaster maeandricus Girard, 1858; Caularchus maeandricus (Girard, 1858); Sicyogaster maeandricus (Girard, 1858); Lepadogaster reticulatus Girard, 1854

= Northern clingfish =

Species of fish

The northern clingfish (Gobiesox maeandricus) is a small marine species that inhabits the intertidal zone of the eastern Pacific Ocean. It is a member of the Gobiesocidae family, a group of ray-finned fishes known for their specialized suction discs, which allow them to cling to rocks and other substrates in dynamic tidal environments.

== Description ==
Gobiesox maeandricus are characterized by a flattened, elongated body and head, with smooth, slimy, scaleless skin. They can be identified by 12–14 anal soft rays and 13–16 dorsal soft rays, and they lack spined rays. Their caudal fins are rounded, while their pectoral fins are short and broad, aiding in suction and maneuverability. Adults typically reach around 7.6 cm (3 inches) in length, although they can grow up to 17 cm (6.5 inches). Their coloration ranges from brown to reddish tones, with juveniles displaying distinctive white bars along the dorsal side and the edge of the caudal fin. Morphologically, they possess a reduced swim bladder and lack a stomach.

Clingfish are distinguished by their modified pelvic and pectoral fins, which are fused together to create a powerful suction disc that allows them to cling to various surfaces. This adhesive structure is located on the ventral side of their body and enables them to withstand powerful waves by attaching to rough substrates.

They possess specialized epithelial microstructures called epidermal papillae, which are subdivided into tiny filaments that surround the disc. Under a microscope, these filaments are soft, hair-like structures that provide friction. When the edges of the suction disc move inward to attach to a surface, water attempts to leak underneath; however, the hair-like filaments prevent this from occurring. Despite strong currents and wave action, these discs can generate attachment forces 80 to 150 times the fish’s body weight.

Most rocks in their habitat are fouled with biofilms (algae, bacteria, and invertebrates), enhancing the clingfish’s ability to attach itself because they anchor to the biological layer rather than the bare rock. On unfouled rocks, the disc may fail to adhere effectively. The fish can adhere to a wide range of surface types—from slippery to nonslippery and from smooth to rough. Body size also influences adhesive performance, as larger fish have greater surface area for friction. Researchers study the clingfish’s suction abilities to improve adhesive technologies.

== Geographic distribution ==
The G. maeandricus species lives in the rocky intertidal zone of the eastern Pacific. Its geographic range extends from the coastlines of Canada and the United States, stretching from southeastern Alaska down to southern California, and continuing into Baja California, Mexico. Some individuals are also found around the Revillagigedo Island in the eastern Pacific. As an intertidal inhabitant, this species experiences constant environmental changes due to the tides. G. maeandricus is abundant throughout its native range.

== Life history ==
Northern clingfish, like others in their taxonomic family, are cryptobenthic fish, meaning most of their lives are spent hidden among rocks and vegetation in shallow coastal waters from 0–8 meters deep. These fish occupy a variety of microhabitats within the intertidal zone, including rocky tide pools and the upper regions of the kelp canopy.

Their reliance on compact, discreet spaces strongly supports their solitary lifestyle, which is characterized by a lack of long-distance migration, limited dispersal, and reduced territorial behaviors. However, when provoked, they can exhibit territorial behavior. By remaining close to substrate and within confined spaces, they minimize exposure to predators and environmental stress.

During high tide, when the water column expands and surfaces become accessible, these fish actively explore and reposition themselves. This mobility allows them to feed on a broad array of tide-pool organisms, including small crustaceans, mollusks, isopods, worms, and limpets. Their suction disc is essential to this diet, enabling them to pry prey from hard surfaces. When feeding on limpets, clingfish apply suction directly to the shell, creating enough force to detach them.

During low tide, their behavior changes dramatically. They remain sheltered beneath rocks or within crevices to avoid predation by birds and terrestrial predators, as well as desiccation caused by exposure to air and sunlight. Although capable of respiring in air for short periods, they must periodically return to water to maintain hydration and physiological function.

Reproductively, G. maeandricus are oviparous. Spawning usually occurs in spring (April–June), although timing can vary depending on the size and condition of the individual. Males construct nests in rocky crevices where females deposit adhesive eggs. After fertilization, males guard the eggs until they hatch. Larvae attach to kelp during early development before relocating into more dynamic intertidal regions. Predators such as gopher snakes have been documented feeding on these fish along the shores of the San Juan Islands.

== Conservation status ==
G. maeandricus does not have an official conservation status in some locations, but due to its relatively stable and widespread population distribution, it is not currently of concern. In 2024, the IUCN Red List identified it as a Least Concern species.

Environmental disturbances from human activity threaten the habitat of the Northern Clingfish. Water pollution (e.g., oil spills, agricultural runoff, mining waste, heavy metals, pesticides) and coastal urban development negatively impact the intertidal ecosystem. They are also vulnerable to trampling, foraging, and harvesting in tide pools.

Natural climate-related influences—including the Pacific Decadal Oscillation, Northern Pacific Gyre Oscillation, and alternating El Niño and La Niña events—lead to changes in precipitation, storm intensity, upwelling winds, nutrient concentrations, and vegetation productivity. These processes influence habitat stability and increase species vulnerability.

Conservation efforts protecting rocky intertidal environments indirectly support and sustain populations of Northern Clingfish.
