= Clathria elegans =

Scientific classification
- Domain: Eukaryota
- Kingdom: Animalia
- Phylum: Porifera
- Class: Demospongiae
- Order: Poecilosclerida
- Family: Microcionidae
- Genus: Clathria
- Subgenus: Clathria
- Species: C. elegans

Binomial name
- Clathria elegans Vosmaer, 1880

Synonyms
- Clathria (Clathria) elegans

Species of sponge

Clathria elegans is a species of sea sponge in the family Microcionidae. It is found in the United States part of the North Atlantic Ocean. It was first described in 1880 by Gualtherus Carel Jacob Vosmaer.
