= Pherallodiscus =

Scientific classification
- Kingdom: Animalia
- Phylum: Chordata
- Class: Actinopterygii
- Order: Blenniiformes
- Family: Gobiesocidae
- Subfamily: Gobiesocinae
- Genus: Pherallodiscus; Briggs, 1955

Type species
- Gobiesox funebris Gilbert, 1890

Genus of fishes

Pherallodiscus is a genus of clingfishes native to the central eastern Pacific Ocean along the coast of Mexico. Based on genetic studies the genus should be merged into Gobiesox.

== Species ==
There are currently two recognized species in this genus:

- Pherallodiscus funebris (C. H. Gilbert, 1890) (Northern fraildisc clingfish)
- Pherallodiscus varius Briggs, 1955 (Southern fraildisc clingfish)
