= Clathria compressa =

Scientific classification
- Kingdom: Animalia
- Phylum: Porifera
- Class: Demospongiae
- Order: Poecilosclerida
- Family: Microcionidae
- Genus: Clathria
- Subgenus: Clathria
- Species: C. compressa

Binomial name
- Clathria compressa Schmidt, 1862

Species of sea sponge

Clathria compressa, also known as Clathria (Clathria) compressa, is a species of sea sponge in the family Microcionidae. It is the type species of the genus Clathria.

It is described by Lévi, 1960 as follows: arbuscular sponge, erect, averaging 40-45 mm in height, pedunculate, with compressed, lamellar branches, particularly near their distal end, frequently anastomosing, forming a series of cavities with flaky walls. Orange in color, always gray or brownish after preservation.

The skeleton is plumoreticular and composed of multi-spiculated and single-spiculated fibres that incorporate the slightly divergent main styles.

Spicules: Main subtylostyles smooth, or furnished with very fine spines at the base, slightly curved, with a barely perceptible base: 130-450 μm in length by 10-18 μm in diameter. Accessory acanthostyles, whose sharp spines are often recurved and are more abundant in the apical half: 75-130 μm x 7-9 μm. Auxiliary straight subtylostyles, with smooth or spiny heads: 110-250 μm x 6 μm. Palmate isochelae, always slender: 6-9 μm. Toxa with fairly pronounced flexion and points furnished with spines: 40-65 μm, 80-120-170 μm; height at the center 15-35 μm.

Distribution: Mediterranean (Adriatic, Naples, Banyuls, Algeria) and Atlantic (Senegal).
