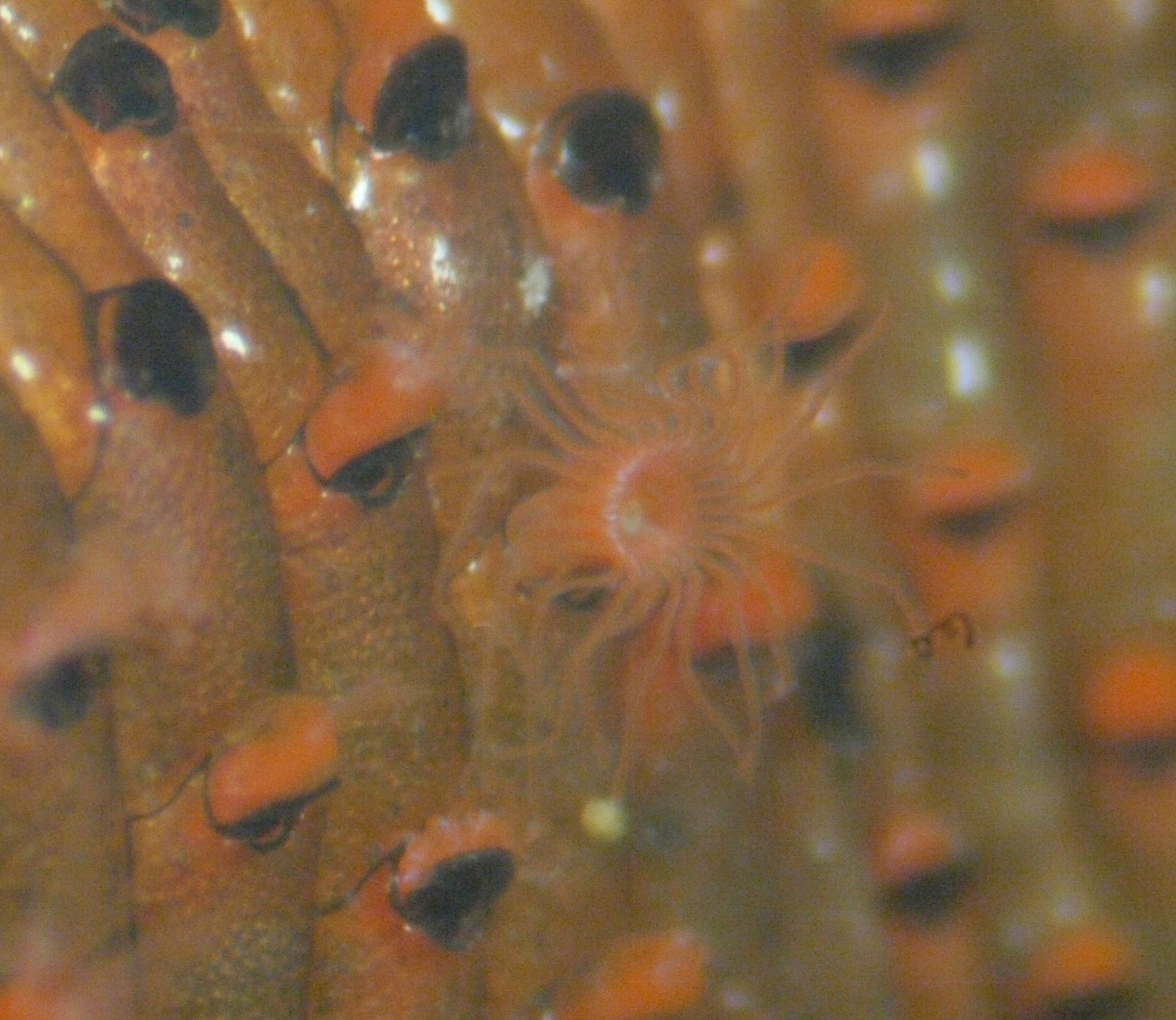
- Watersipora subovoidea

Scientific classification
- Kingdom: Animalia
- Phylum: Bryozoa
- Class: Gymnolaemata
- Order: Cheilostomatida
- Family: Watersiporidae
- Genus: Watersipora; Neviani, 1896

Synonyms
- Dakaria Jullien, 1903

= Watersipora =

Genus of bryozoans

Watersipora is a genus of bryozoans belonging to the family Watersiporidae.

The genus has cosmopolitan distribution.

Species:

- Watersipora arcuata Banta, 1969
- Watersipora aterrima (Ortmann, 1890)
- Watersipora atrofusca (Busk, 1856)
- Watersipora bidentata (Ortmann, 1890)
- Watersipora cucullata (Busk, 1854)
- Watersipora erecta Canu & Bassler, 1920
- Watersipora faragii (Abbas & El-Senoussi, 1979)
- Watersipora grandis (Canu & Bassler, 1923)
- Watersipora hanzawae (Kataoka, 1961)
- Watersipora mawatarii Vieira, Spencer Jones & Taylor, 2014
- Watersipora nigra (Canu & Bassler, 1930)
- Watersipora platypora Seo, 1999
- Watersipora souleorum Vieira, Spencer Jones & Taylor, 2014
- Watersipora subatra (Ortmann, 1890)
- Watersipora subovoidea (d'Orbigny, 1852)
- Watersipora subtorquata (d'Orbigny, 1852)
- Watersipora watersi de Stefani, 1884
