= Clathria lissoclada =

Scientific classification
- Domain: Eukaryota
- Kingdom: Animalia
- Phylum: Porifera
- Class: Demospongiae
- Order: Poecilosclerida
- Family: Microcionidae
- Genus: Clathria
- Subgenus: Thalysias
- Species: C. lissoclada

Binomial name
- Clathria lissoclada (Burton, 1934)

Synonyms
- Rhaphidophlus lissocladus Burton, 1934

Species of sponge

Clathria lissoclada, the triangular blade sponge, is a species of demosponge from the southern hemisphere.

== Description ==
This stalked pink to orange sponge grows up to a length of 180 mm (7.1 in)and a width of 80 mm (3.1 in). The somewhat flat branches arise from semi-triangular blades. The surface is smooth with many randomly distributed oscules. This sponge is semi-compressible and tough.

== Distribution and habitat ==
This species is found off the coast of South Africa and off the Falklands. It is found at depths of 16–77 m (52–253 ft).

== Ecology ==
This species often has polyp-like invertebrates living on its surface.
