= Clathria matthewsi =

Scientific classification
- Kingdom: Animalia
- Phylum: Porifera
- Class: Demospongiae
- Order: Poecilosclerida
- Family: Microcionidae
- Genus: Clathria
- Subgenus: Microciona
- Species: C. matthewsi

Binomial name
- Clathria matthewsi Goodwin, Brewin & Brickle, 2012

Species of sponge

Clathria matthewsi is a species of sea sponge first found on the coast of South Georgia island, in the south west Southern Ocean.
