= Clathria stromnessa =

Scientific classification
- Kingdom: Animalia
- Phylum: Porifera
- Class: Demospongiae
- Order: Poecilosclerida
- Family: Microcionidae
- Genus: Clathria
- Subgenus: Clathria
- Species: C. stromnessa

Binomial name
- Clathria stromnessa Goodwin, Brewin & Brickle, 2012

Species of sponge

Clathria stromnessa is a species of sea sponge first found on the coast of South Georgia island, in the south west Southern Ocean.
