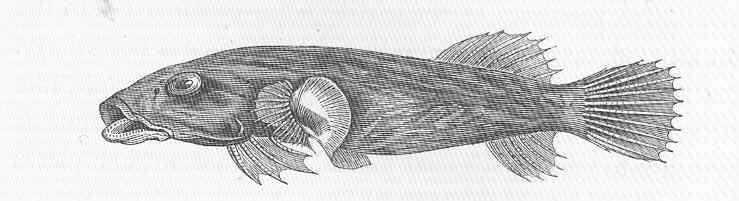

Conservation status
- Data Deficient (IUCN 3.1)

Scientific classification
- Kingdom: Animalia
- Phylum: Chordata
- Class: Actinopterygii
- Division: Teleostei
- Order: Blenniiformes
- Family: Gobiesocidae
- Genus: Gobiesox
- Species: G. cephalus

Binomial name
- Gobiesox cephalus Lacépède, 1800

= Gobiesox cephalus =

Species of fish

Gobiesox cephalus, the riverine clingfish or smooth clingfish, is a species of clingfish from the family Gobiesocidae. It is found in the coastal river drainages of the Caribbean from Cuba south to Colombia and Venezuela. It occurs in freshwater, and sometimes in brackish water, preferring a fast current. It is a solitary species which feeds on fishscales, insects and small fish. It is the type species of the genus Gobiesox and was described by Bernard Germain de Lacépède in 1800 with Amérique méridionale (Central America) given as the type locality.
