= Clathria hillenburgi =

Scientific classification
- Kingdom: Animalia
- Phylum: Porifera
- Class: Demospongiae
- Order: Poecilosclerida
- Family: Microcionidae
- Genus: Clathria
- Subgenus: Axosuberites
- Species: C. hillenburgi

Binomial name
- Clathria hillenburgi Annunziata, Cavalcanti, Santos & Pinheiro, 2019

Species of sea sponge

Clathria hillenburgi, also known as Clathria (Axosuberites) hillenburgi, is a species of sea sponge in the family Microcionidae. It is endemic to the coast of Brazil.

It has been documented in mangrove habitats off the coast of Paraíba, where it has been found growing on Rhizophora roots in the Mamanguape River estuary. Despite being found off the coast of tropical Brazil, this species closely resembles C. (Thalysias) mauriceburtoni (formerly C. flabellata) and C. (Axosuberites) georgiaensis, two species found off the coast of Antarctica.

This species was named in honor of Stephen Hillenburg, an American marine science educator and creator of the famous animated series SpongeBob SquarePants, who had died several months prior to the species' description.
