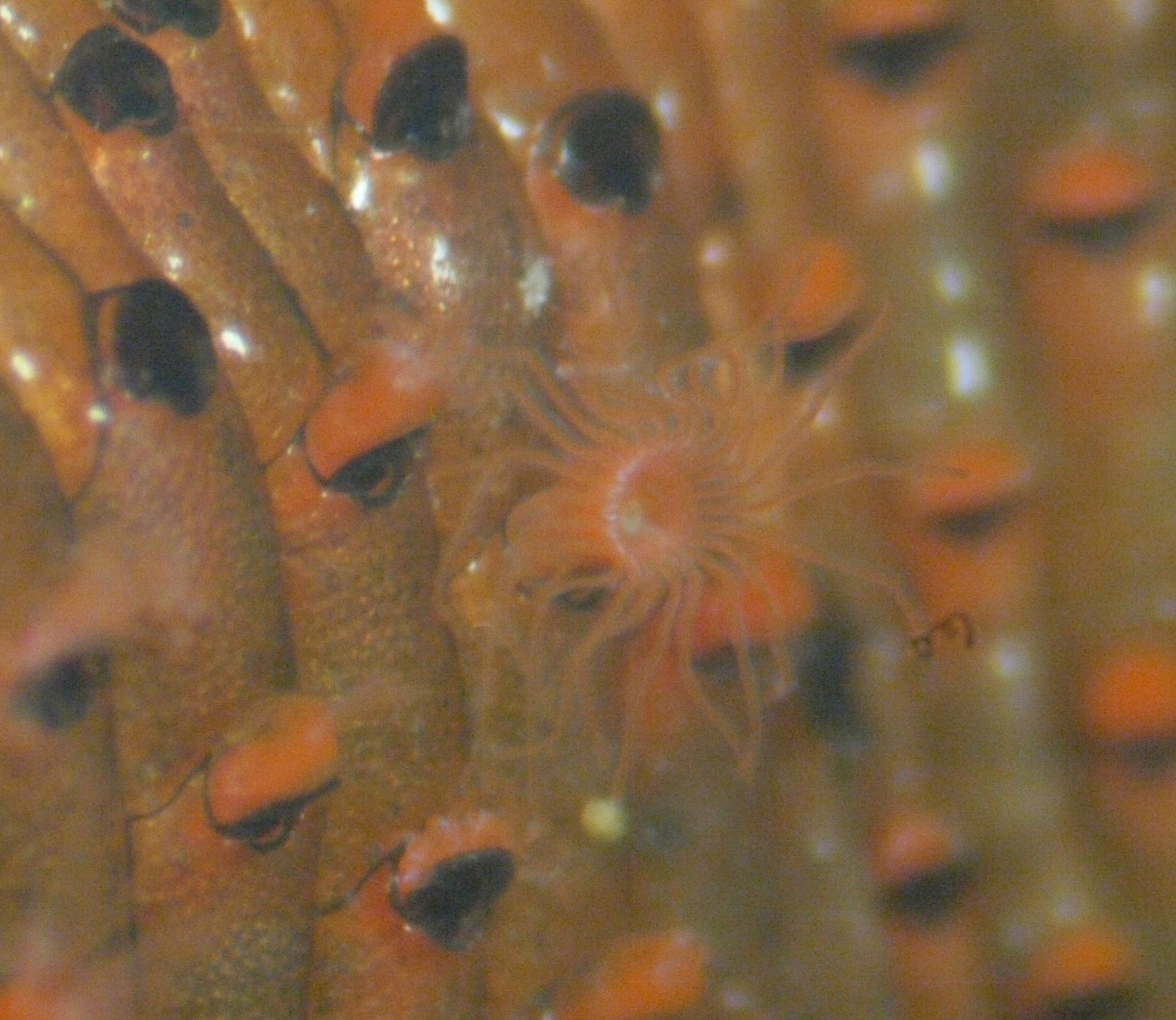

Scientific classification
- Kingdom: Animalia
- Phylum: Bryozoa
- Class: Gymnolaemata
- Order: Cheilostomatida
- Family: Watersiporidae; Vigneaux, 1949

Genera
- See text

= Watersiporidae =

Family of moss animals

Watersiporidae is a family of bryozoans in the order Cheilostomatida.

== Genera and species ==
The World Register of Marine Species includes the following genera and species in the family :

- Uscia Banta, 1969
  - Uscia mexicana Banta, 1969
- Veleroa Osburn, 1952
  - Veleroa veleronis Osburn, 1952
- Watersipora Neviani, 1896
  - Watersipora arcuata Banta, 1969
  - Watersipora aterrima (Ortmann, 1890)
  - Watersipora atrofusca (Busk, 1856)
  - Watersipora bidentata (Ortmann, 1890)
  - Watersipora complanata (Norman, 1864)
  - Watersipora cucullata (Busk, 1854)
  - Watersipora mawatarii Vieira, Spencer Jones & Taylor, 2014
  - Watersipora nigra (Canu & Bassler, 1930)
  - Watersipora platypora Seo, 1999
  - Watersipora souleorum Vieira, Spencer Jones & Taylor, 2014
  - Watersipora subatra (Ortmann, 1890)
  - Watersipora subtorquata (d'Orbigny, 1852)
  - Watersipora typica (Okada & Mawatari, 1937)
