= Clathria dayi =

Scientific classification
- Kingdom: Animalia
- Phylum: Porifera
- Class: Demospongiae
- Order: Poecilosclerida
- Family: Microcionidae
- Genus: Clathria
- Subgenus: Clathria
- Species: C. dayi

Binomial name
- Clathria dayi Lévi, 1963

Species of sponge

Clathria dayi, the broad-bladed tree sponge, is a species of demosponge. It is known from the west coast of South Africa and around Cape Point to False Bay. It is probably endemic to this region.

== Description ==
The broad-bladed tree sponge may grow to 20 cm in height and be 2–4 cm thick. It is a massive erect sponge, having broad flat blades extending from a small stalk. It has a slightly hairy texture, but is smooth in appearance. It is bright red in colour.

== Habitat ==
This sponge lives on rocky reefs in 15-272m of water.
