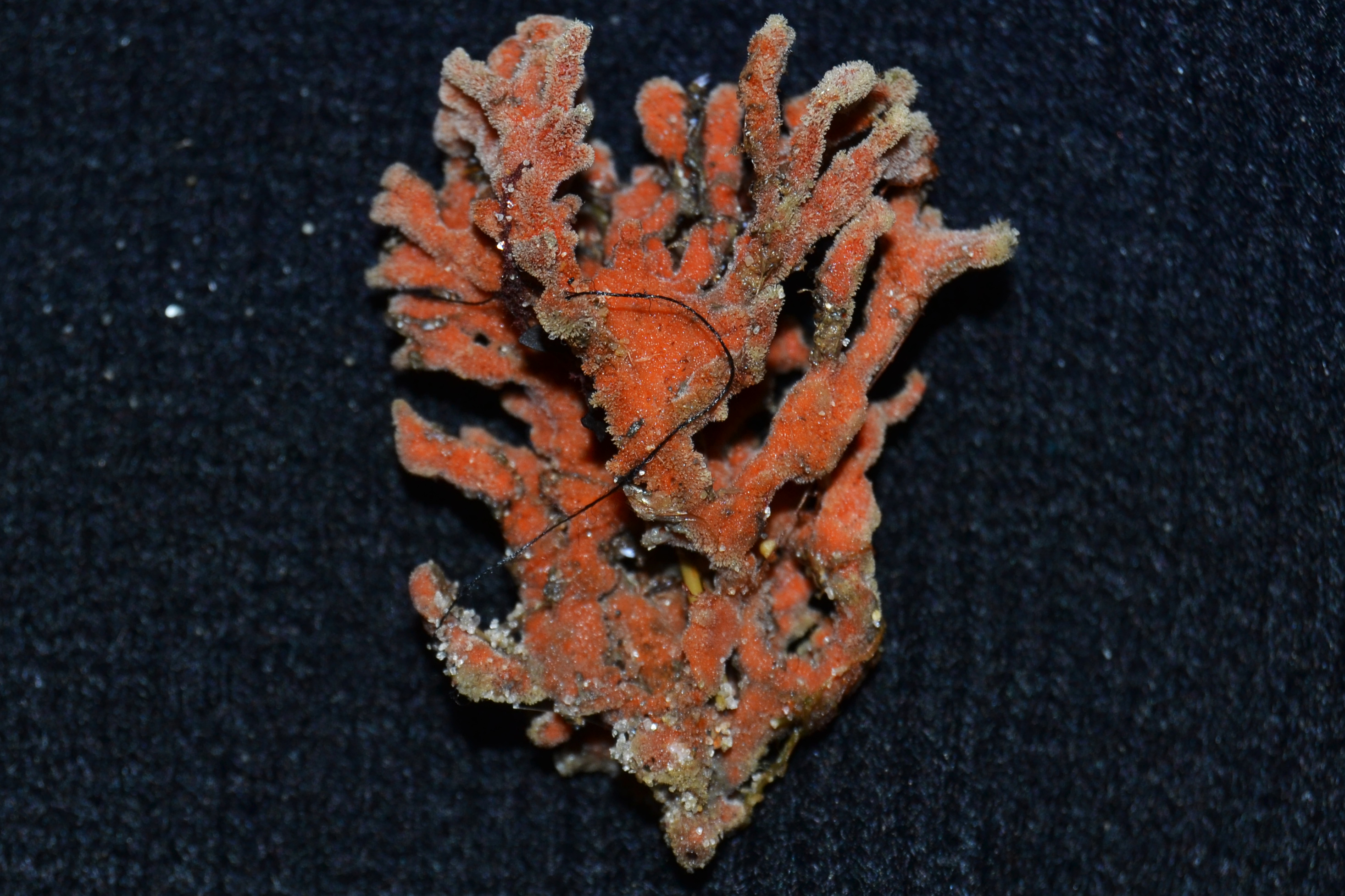
- Clathria prolifera

Scientific classification
- Kingdom: Animalia
- Phylum: Porifera
- Class: Demospongiae
- Order: Poecilosclerida
- Family: Microcionidae
- Subfamily: Microcioninae
- Genus: Clathria; Schmidt, 1862

= Clathria =

Genus of sponges

Clathria is a large genus of demosponges in the family Microcionidae.

== Taxonomy ==
Clathria was first formally named in Eduard Oscar Schmidt's 1862 Die Spongien des adriatischen Meeres ("The sponges of the Adriatic Sea"). The type species is Clathria (Clathria) compressa.

The genus is divided into several subgenera:

- Clathria (Axosuberites) Topsent, 1893
- Clathria (Clathria) Schmidt, 1862
- Clathria (Cornulotrocha) Hallmann, 1920
- Clathria (Dendrocia) Topsent, 1927
- Clathria (Isociella) Hallmann, 1920
- Clathria (Microciona) Bowerbank, 1862
- Clathria (Paresperia) Burton, 1930
- Clathria (Thalysias) Duchassaing & Michelotti, 1864
- Clathria (Wilsonella) Carter, 1885

== Species ==
The following species are recognised in the genus Clathria:

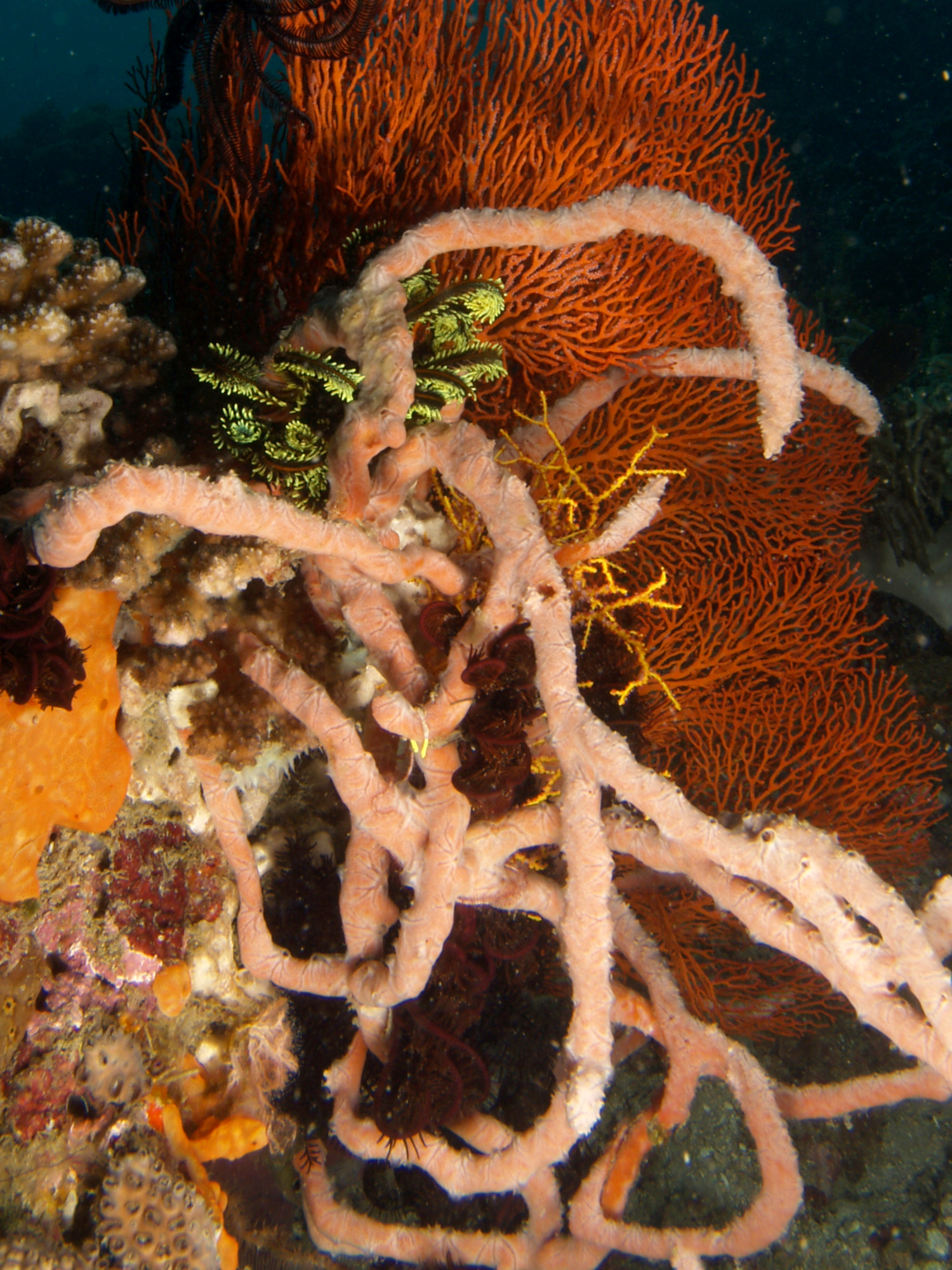
Clathria reinwardti

Subgenus Axosuberites Topsent, 1893

- Clathria aurantia Annunziata, Cavalcanti, Santos & Pinheiro, 2019
- Clathria benguelaensis Samaai & Gibbons, 2005
- Clathria canaliculata (Whitelegge, 1906)
- Clathria cylindrica (Ridley & Dendy, 1886)
- Clathria fauroti (Topsent, 1893)
- Clathria flabellata (Topsent, 1916)
- Clathria fromontae Hooper, 1996
- Clathria georgiaensis Hooper, 1996
- Clathria hillenburgi Annunziata, Cavalcanti, Santos & Pinheiro, 2019
- Clathria lambei (Koltun, 1955)
- Clathria macrotoxa (Bergquist & Fromont, 1988)
- Clathria marplatensis (Cuartas, 1992)
- Clathria multitoxaformis (Bergquist & Fromont, 1988)
- Clathria nidificata (Kirkpatrick, 1907)
- Clathria pachyaxia (Lévi, 1960)
- Clathria papillata Van Soest, Beglinger & De Voogd, 2013
- Clathria parva Lévi, 1963
- Clathria patula (Hooper, 1996)
- Clathria ramea (Koltun, 1964)
- Clathria retamalesi Fernandez, Bravo-Gómez, Cárdenas & Hajdu, 2020
- Clathria riosae Van Soest, 2017
- Clathria rosita Goodwin, Brewin & Brickle, 2012
- Clathria thetidis (Hallmann, 1920)

Subgenus Clathria Schmidt, 1862

- Clathria acanthostyli (Hoshino, 1981)
- Clathria acanthotoxa (Stephens, 1916)
- Clathria angulifera Dendy, 1896
- Clathria anthoides Lévi, 1993
- Clathria antyaja (Burton & Rao, 1932)
- Clathria arbuscula (Row, 1911)
- Clathria arcifera (Schmidt, 1868)
- Clathria arcuophora Whitelegge, 1907
- Clathria arroyoi Uriz, 1984
- Clathria asodes (de Laubenfels, 1930)
- Clathria axociona Lévi, 1963
- Clathria barleei (Bowerbank, 1866)
- Clathria basilana Lévi, 1961
- Clathria bergquistae Van Soest & Hooper, 2020
- Clathria biclathrata Hooper in Hooper & Wiedenmayer, 1994
- Clathria borealis Hooper, 1996
- Clathria bulbosa Hooper & Lévi, 1993
- Clathria burtoni Cuartas, 1995
- Clathria caelata Hallmann, 1912
- Clathria calopora Whitelegge, 1907
- Clathria calypso Boury-Esnault, 1973
- Clathria carteri Topsent, 1889
- Clathria chelifera (Hentschel, 1911)
- Clathria (Clathria) compressa Schmidt, 1862
- Clathria conectens (Hallmann, 1912)
- Clathria conica Lévi, 1963
- Clathria contorta (Bergquist & Fromont, 1988)
- Clathria coralloides (Scopoli, 1772)
- Clathria crassa (Lendenfeld, 1887)
- Clathria dayi Lévi, 1963
- Clathria decumbens Ridley, 1884
- Clathria depressa Sarà & Melone, 1966
- Clathria discreta (Thiele, 1905)
- Clathria echinonematissima (Carter, 1887)
- Clathria elastica Lévi, 1963
- Clathria elegans Vosmaer, 1880
- Clathria faviformis Lehnert & van Soest, 1996
- Clathria flo Payne, Samaai & Gibbons, 2025
- Clathria foliacea Topsent, 1889
- Clathria foliascens Vacelet & Vasseur, 1971
- Clathria frondiculata (Schmidt, 1864)
- Clathria gageoensis Kim & Sim, 2005
- Clathria gimnyeoungenesis Kim & Sim, 2008
- Clathria gombawuiensis Kim & Sim, 2005
- Clathria gomezae Van Soest, 2017
- Clathria gorgonioides (Dendy, 1916)
- Clathria hexagonopora Lévi, 1963
- Clathria hispidula (Ridley, 1884)
- Clathria hjorti (Arnesen, 1920)
- Clathria hongdoensis Kim & Sim, 2006
- Clathria horrida (Row, 1911)
- Clathria ieoensis Kang & Kim, 2018
- Clathria inanchorata Ridley & Dendy, 1886
- Clathria indica Dendy, 1889
- Clathria inhacensis Thomas, 1979
- Clathria intermedia Kirk, 1911
- Clathria irregularis (Burton, 1931)
- Clathria juncea Burton, 1931
- Clathria jungtaedoensis Kim & Sim, 2007
- Clathria koreana Sim & Lee, 1998
- Clathria kylista Hooper & Lévi, 1993
- Clathria laevigata Lambe, 1893
- Clathria lipochela Burton, 1932
- Clathria lissosclera Bergquist & Fromont, 1988
- Clathria lobata Vosmaer, 1880
- Clathria macroisochela Lévi, 1993
- Clathria maeandrina Ridley, 1884
- Clathria marissuperi Pulitzer-Finali, 1983
- Clathria menoui Hooper & Lévi, 1993
- Clathria meyeri (Bowerbank, 1877)
- Clathria microchela (Stephens, 1916)
- Clathria microxa Desqueyroux, 1972
- Clathria mortenseni (Brøndsted, 1924)
- Clathria mosulpia Sim & Byeon, 1989
- Clathria multiformis Samaai, Pillay & Janson, 2019
- Clathria multipes Hallmann, 1912
- Clathria murphyi Hooper, 1996
- Clathria nicoleae Vieira de Barros, Santos & Pinheiro, 2013
- Clathria noarlungae Hooper, 1996
- Clathria obliqua (George & Wilson, 1919)
- Clathria oculata Burton, 1933
- Clathria omegiensis Samaai & Gibbons, 2005
- Clathria oxyphila (Hallmann, 1912)
- Clathria pachystyla Lévi, 1963
- Clathria papillosa Thiele, 1905
- Clathria partita Hallmann, 1912
- Clathria paucispicula (Burton, 1932)
- Clathria pauper Brøndsted, 1927
- Clathria pellicula Whitelegge, 1897
- Clathria perforata (Lendenfeld, 1887)
- Clathria piniformis (Carter, 1885)
- Clathria plurityla Pulitzer-Finali, 1983
- Clathria priestleyae Goodwin, Berman & Hendry, 2019
- Clathria productitoxa (Hoshino, 1981)
- Clathria prolifera (Ellis & Solander, 1786)
- Clathria pyramidalis (Brøndsted, 1924)
- Clathria ramsayiensis Samaai, Pillay & Janson, 2019
- Clathria ramus Kang & Kim, 2018
- Clathria raphanus (Lamarck, 1814)
- Clathria rectangulosa Schmidt, 1870
- Clathria reticularis Kim & Sim, 2008
- Clathria rhaphidotoxa Stephens, 1915
- Clathria rubens (Lendenfeld, 1888)
- Clathria sarai Hooper, 1996
- Clathria saraspinifera Hooper, 1996
- Clathria sartaginula (Lamarck, 1814)
- Clathria shirahama Tanita, 1977
- Clathria sohuksanensis Kim & Sim, 2006
- Clathria spinispicula Tanita, 1968
- Clathria spongodes Dendy, 1922
- Clathria squalorum Wiedenmayer in Hooper & Wiedenmayer, 1994
- Clathria striata Whitelegge, 1907
- Clathria stromnessa Goodwin, Brewin & Brickle, 2012
- Clathria surculosa (Esper, 1797)
- Clathria terraenovae Dendy, 1924
- Clathria tortuosa Uriz, 1988
- Clathria toxipraedita Topsent, 1913
- Clathria toxistricta Topsent, 1925
- Clathria toxistyla (Sarà, 1959)
- Clathria toxivaria (Sarà, 1959)
- Clathria transiens Hallmann, 1912
- Clathria typica sensu Kirkpatrick, 1903
- Clathria ulmus Vosmaer, 1880
- Clathria unica Cuartas, 1992
- Clathria unoriginalis Turner & Lonhart, 2023
- Clathria vasiformis (de Laubenfels, 1953)
- Clathria whiteleggii Dendy, 1922
- Clathria wilsoni Wiedenmayer, 1989
- Clathria zoanthifera Lévi, 1963

Subgenus Cornulotrocha Topsent, 1927

- Clathria cheliglomerata Van Soest, Beglinger & De Voogd, 2013
- Clathria cheliradians (Topsent, 1927)
- Clathria polita (Ridley, 1881)
- Clathria rosetafiordica Hajdu, Desqueyroux-Faúndez & Willenz, 2006

Subgenus Dendrocia Hallmann, 1920

- Clathria curvichela (Hallmann, 1912)
- Clathria dura Whitelegge, 1901
- Clathria elegantula Ridley & Dendy, 1886
- Clathria imperfecta Dendy, 1896
- Clathria myxilloides Dendy, 1896
- Clathria pyramida Lendenfeld, 1888
- Clathria scabida (Carter, 1885)
- Clathria tuberculata (Burton, 1934)

Subgenus Isociella Hallmann, 1920

- Clathria eccentrica (Burton, 1934)
- Clathria incrustans Bergquist, 1961
- Clathria macropora Lendenfeld, 1888
- Clathria oudekraalensis Samaai & Gibbons, 2005
- Clathria selachia Hooper, 1996
- Clathria skia Hooper, 1996

Subgenus Microciona Bowerbank, 1862

- Clathria acarnoides Van Soest, Meesters & Becking, 2014
- Clathria aceratoobtusa (Carter, 1887)
- Clathria achelata Sandes & Pinheiro, 2016
- Clathria aculeofila Aguirre, Hooker, Willenz & Hajdu, 2011
- Clathria adioristica (de Laubenfels, 1953)
- Clathria affinis (Carter, 1880)
- Clathria africana (Lévi, 1956)
- Clathria anancora (Topsent, 1904)
- Clathria angularis (Sarà & Siribelli, 1960)
- Clathria anonyma (Burton, 1959)
- Clathria antarctica (Topsent, 1917)
- Clathria aquaradiata Ott, McDaniel & Humphrey, 2024
- Clathria armata (Bowerbank, 1862)
- Clathria ascendens (Cabioch, 1968)
- Clathria ascensionis Van Soest, Beglinger & De Voogd, 2013
- Clathria assimilis Topsent, 1925
- Clathria atoxa Topsent, 1928
- Clathria atrasanguinea (Bowerbank, 1862)
- Clathria aurea Van Soest, Beglinger & De Voogd, 2013
- Clathria basifixa (Topsent, 1913)
- Clathria bicleistochelifera Van Soest, Beglinger & De Voogd, 2013
- Clathria bitoxa (Burton, 1930)
- Clathria boavistae Van Soest, Beglinger & De Voogd, 2013
- Clathria brepha (Laubenfels, 1930)
- Clathria bulboretorta (Carter, 1880)
- Clathria bulbotoxa van Soest, 1984
- Clathria calla (Laubenfels, 1934)
- Clathria calloides Van Soest, Beglinger & De Voogd, 2013
- Clathria campecheae Hooper, 1996
- Clathria cancapseptima Van Soest, Beglinger & De Voogd, 2013
- Clathria capverdensis Van Soest, Beglinger & De Voogd, 2013
- Clathria cheeki Goodwin, Jones, Neely & Brickle, 2016
- Clathria claudei Hooper, 1996
- Clathria cleistochela Topsent, 1925
- Clathria coccinea (Bergquist, 1961)
- Clathria conchicola Van Soest, Beglinger & De Voogd, 2013
- Clathria crassitoxa Santos & Pinheiro, 2014
- Clathria ctenichela (Alander, 1942)
- Clathria danielae Cavalcanti, Santos & Pinheiro, 2019
- Clathria dendyi (Bergquist & Fromont, 1988)
- Clathria densa (Burton, 1959)
- Clathria dianae (Schmidt, 1875)
- Clathria ditoxa (Stephens, 1916)
- Clathria duplex Sarà, 1958
- Clathria echinata (Alcolado, 1984)
- Clathria elliptichela (Alander, 1942)
- Clathria fallax (Bowerbank, 1866)
- Clathria ferrea (de Laubenfels, 1936)
- Clathria frogeti (Vacelet, 1969)
- Clathria gorgadensis Van Soest, Beglinger & De Voogd, 2013
- Clathria gradalis Topsent, 1925
- Clathria grisea (Hentschel, 1911)
- Clathria haematodes (de Laubenfels, 1957)
- Clathria haplotoxa (Topsent, 1928)
- Clathria hentscheli Hooper, 1996
- Clathria heterotoxa (Hentschel, 1929)
- Clathria hymedesmioides van Soest, 1984
- Clathria illawarrae Hooper, 1996
- Clathria ixauda (Lévi, 1969)
- Clathria laevis (Bowerbank, 1866)
- Clathria lajorei (de Laubenfels, 1954)
- Clathria larae Cavalcanti, Santos & Pinheiro, 2019
- Clathria leighensis Hooper, 1996
- Clathria levii (Sarà & Siribelli, 1960)
- Clathria lizardensis Hooper, 1996
- Clathria longistyla (Burton, 1959)
- Clathria macrochela (Lévi, 1960)
- Clathria matthewsi Goodwin, Brewin & Brickle, 2012
- Clathria microjoanna (de Laubenfels, 1930)
- Clathria micronesia (de Laubenfels, 1954)
- Clathria microxea (Vacelet & Vasseur, 1971)
- Clathria mima (de Laubenfels, 1954)
- Clathria moraesi Cavalcanti, Santos & Pinheiro, 2019
- Clathria mytilifila Hajdu, Desqueyroux-Faúndez, Carvalho, Lôbo-Hajdu & Willenz, 2013
- Clathria namibiensis (Uriz, 1984)
- Clathria nisiae Cavalcanti, Santos & Pinheiro, 2019
- Clathria normani (Burton, 1930)
- Clathria novaezealandiae (Brøndsted, 1924)
- Clathria osismica (Cabioch, 1968)
- Clathria parthena (de Laubenfels, 1930)
- Clathria pennata (Lambe, 1895)
- Clathria plinthina (de Laubenfels, 1954)
- Clathria poecilosclera (Sarà & Siribelli, 1960)
- Clathria primitiva (Koltun, 1955)
- Clathria rarispinosa (Hechtel, 1965)
- Clathria rhopalophora (Hentschel, 1912)
- Clathria richmondi Hooper, Kelly & Kennedy, 2000
- Clathria rumsena Turner & Lonhart, 2023
- Clathria saoensis Gastaldi, De Paula, Narvarte, Lôbo-Hajdu & Hajdu, 2018
- Clathria scotti (Dendy, 1924)
- Clathria sigmoidea (Cuartas, 1992)
- Clathria simae Hooper, 1996
- Clathria similis (Thiele, 1903)
- Clathria sinyangensis Kim & Sim, 2009
- Clathria snelliusae Van Soest, 2017
- Clathria spinarcus (Carter & Hope, 1889)
- Clathria spinatoxa (Hoshino, 1981)
- Clathria spinosa (Wilson, 1902)
- Clathria spongigartina (Laubenfels, 1930)
- Clathria stellata Sim-Smith, Hickman & Kelly, 2021
- Clathria stephensae Hooper, 1996
- Clathria strepsitoxa (Hope, 1889)
- Clathria tenebrosa Goodwin, Jones, Neely & Brickle, 2016
- Clathria tenuis (Stephens, 1915)
- Clathria tenuissima (Stephens, 1916)
- Clathria tetrastyla (Hentschel, 1912)
- Clathria thielei (Hentschel, 1912)
- Clathria toximajor Topsent, 1925
- Clathria toxirecta (Sarà & Siribelli, 1960)
- Clathria toxitenuis Topsent, 1925
- Clathria trairae Santos & Pinheiro, 2014
- Clathria tunisiae Hooper, 1996
- Clathria vacelettia Hooper, 1996

Subgenus Paresperia Burton, 1930

- Clathria anchorata (Carter, 1874)

Subgenus Thalysias Duchassaing & Michelotti, 1864

- Clathria abietina (Lamarck, 1814)
- Clathria amabilis (Thiele, 1905)
- Clathria amirantiensis Hooper, 1996
- Clathria anomala (Burton, 1933)
- Clathria aphylla Hooper, 1996
- Clathria araiosa Hooper & Lévi, 1993
- Clathria arborescens (Ridley, 1884)
- Clathria arteria (de Laubenfels, 1954)
- Clathria aruensis (Hentschel, 1912)
- Clathria basiarenacea (Boury-Esnault, 1973)
- Clathria bitoxifera (Koltun, 1970)
- Clathria cactiformis (Lamarck, 1814)
- Clathria calochela (Hentschel, 1912)
- Clathria cancellaria (Lamarck, 1814)
- Clathria cervicornis (Thiele, 1903)
- Clathria chelosigmoidea Zea, Rodriguez & Martinez, 2014
- Clathria collosclera van Soest, 2009
- Clathria complanata Van Soest, 2017
- Clathria coppingeri Ridley, 1884
- Clathria coralliophila (Thiele, 1903)
- Clathria coriocrassus (Bergquist & Fromont, 1988)
- Clathria corneolia Hooper & Lévi, 1993
- Clathria costifera Hallmann, 1912
- Clathria craspedia Hooper, 1996
- Clathria cratitia (Esper, 1797)
- Clathria cullingworthi Burton, 1931
- Clathria curacaoensis Arndt, 1927
- Clathria darwinensis Hooper, 1996
- Clathria delaubenfelsi (Lévi, 1963)
- Clathria distincta (Thiele, 1903)
- Clathria dubia (Kirkpatrick, 1900)
- Clathria encrusta Kumar, 1925
- Clathria erecta (Thiele, 1899)
- Clathria eurypa (Laubenfels, 1954)
- Clathria fascicularis Topsent, 1889
- Clathria fasciculata Wilson, 1925
- Clathria filifera (Ridley & Dendy, 1886)
- Clathria flabellifera Hooper & Lévi, 1993
- Clathria fusterna Hooper, 1996
- Clathria hallmanni Hooper, 1996
- Clathria hermicola van Soest, Kaiser & Van Syoc, 2011
- Clathria hesperia Hooper, 1996
- Clathria hirsuta Hooper & Lévi, 1993
- Clathria hooperi Samaai & Gibbons, 2005
- Clathria isodictyoides (van Soest, 1984)
- Clathria jolicoeuri (Topsent, 1892)
- Clathria juniperina (Lamarck, 1814)
- Clathria kieschnicki Hooper in Hooper & Wiedenmayer, 1994
- Clathria kilauea (Laubenfels, 1951)
- Clathria koltuni Hooper in Hooper & Wiedenmayer, 1994
- Clathria lambda (Lévi, 1958)
- Clathria lematolae Hooper, 1996
- Clathria lendenfeldi Ridley & Dendy, 1886
- Clathria linda (de Laubenfels, 1954)
- Clathria lissoclada (Burton, 1934)
- Clathria longitoxa (Hentschel, 1912)
- Clathria major Hentschel, 1912
- Clathria maunaloa (de Laubenfels, 1951)
- Clathria mauriceburtoni Van Soest & Hooper, 2020
- Clathria membranacea (Thiele, 1905)
- Clathria michaelseni (Hentschel, 1911)
- Clathria micropunctata (Burton & Rao, 1932)
- Clathria minuta (van Soest, 1984)
- Clathria minutoides Van Soest, Beglinger & De Voogd, 2013
- Clathria mutabilis (Topsent, 1897)
- Clathria naikaiensis (Hoshino, 1981)
- Clathria nervosa (Lévi, 1963)
- Clathria nuda Hentschel, 1912
- †Clathria ongulensis (Hoshino, 1977)
- Clathria opalina Zea, Rodriguez & Martinez, 2014
- Clathria orientalis (Brøndsted, 1934)
- Clathria originalis (de Laubenfels, 1930)
- Clathria oxeota (van Soest, 1984)
- Clathria oxitoxa Lévi, 1963
- Clathria phorbasiformis Hooper, 1996
- Clathria placenta (Lamarck, 1814)
- Clathria procera (Ridley, 1884)
- Clathria ramosa (Kieschnick, 1896)
- Clathria reinwardti Vosmaer, 1880
- Clathria repens Galindo, Hooper & Pinheiro, 2014
- Clathria ridleyi (Lindgren, 1897)
- Clathria robusta (Dendy, 1922)
- Clathria rubispina (Lamarck, 1814)
- Clathria rubra (Lendenfeld, 1888)
- Clathria spinifera (Lindgren, 1897)
- Clathria styloprothesis Hooper, 1996
- Clathria sulfocleistochela Zea, Rodriguez & Martinez, 2014
- Clathria tingens Hooper, 1996
- Clathria topsenti (Thiele, 1899)
- Clathria toxifera (Hentschel, 1912)
- Clathria vacata Van Soest, Beglinger & De Voogd, 2013
- Clathria venosa (Alcolado, 1984)
- Clathria virgultosa (Esper, 1806)
- Clathria vulpina (Lamarck, 1814)
- Clathria wesselensis Hooper, 1996
- Clathria zeai Van Soest, 2017

Subgenus Wilsonella Carter, 1885

- Clathria abrolhosensis Hooper, 1996
- Clathria australiensis Carter, 1885
- Clathria cercidochela (Vacelet & Vasseur, 1971)
- Clathria claviformis Hentschel, 1912
- Clathria ensiae Hooper, 1996
- Clathria foraminifera (Burton & Rao, 1932)
- Clathria guettardi (Topsent, 1933)
- Clathria lindgreni Hooper, 1996
- Clathria litos Hooper & Lévi, 1993
- Clathria mixta Hentschel, 1912
- Clathria nigra (Boury-Esnault, 1973)
- Clathria pseudonapya (de Laubenfels, 1930)
- Clathria reticulata (Lendenfeld, 1888)
- Clathria rugosa Hooper & Lévi, 1993
- Clathria tuberosa (Bowerbank, 1875)

Subgenus unassigned

- Clathria compressa (Bowerbank, 1875)
- Clathria dichela sensu Vacelet, Vasseur & Lévi, 1976
- Clathria frondosa (Pallas, 1766)
- Clathria granulata (Keller, 1889)
- Clathria schmitti (de Laubenfels, 1942)
