= Clathria rosita =

Scientific classification
- Kingdom: Animalia
- Phylum: Porifera
- Class: Demospongiae
- Order: Poecilosclerida
- Family: Microcionidae
- Genus: Clathria
- Subgenus: Axosuberites
- Species: C. rosita

Binomial name
- Clathria rosita Goodwin, Brewin & Brickle, 2012

Species of sponge

Clathria rosita is a species of sea sponge first found on the coast of South Georgia Island, in the southwest Southern Ocean.
