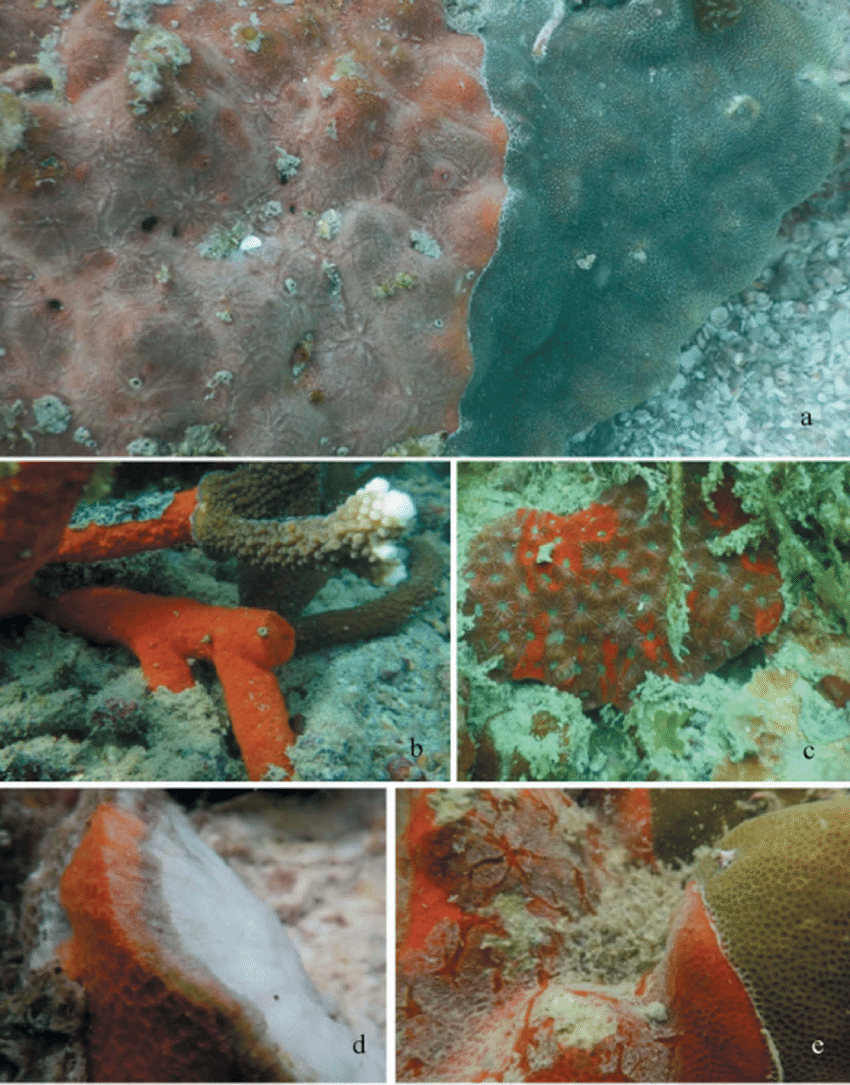
- Five images of Clathria (Microciona) aceratoobtusa at Vilanguchalli Island, Gulf of Mannar. (a) A prominent and profound dermal canal pattern was radiating all over the body upon close observation underwater; (b) Sponge infestation on live tissues of Acropora muricata; (c) Infestation on Favia sp.; (d) The sponge penetrates in a downward direction, inside the coral; (e) Intact corallites, smothered by the sponge cover, still detectable. Scale bars: a, b, c = 2 cm; d, e = 1 cm.

Scientific classification
- Kingdom: Animalia
- Phylum: Porifera
- Class: Demospongiae
- Order: Poecilosclerida
- Family: Microcionidae
- Genus: Clathria
- Subgenus: Microciona
- Species: C. aceratoobtusa

Binomial name
- Clathria aceratoobtusa (Carter, 1887)

Synonyms
- Microciona aceratoobtusa Carter, 1887

= Clathria aceratoobtusa =

Species of sponge

Clathria aceratoobtusa is a species of sponge in the family Microcionidae. The genus Clathria is subdivided into a number of subgenera, and it is in the subgenus Microciona. It is native to shallow water habitats in the Indo-Pacific region. The type locality is the Gulf of Thailand.

== Description ==
Clathria aceratoobtusa is an encrusting sponge forming patches 0.4 to 2 mm (0.02 to 0.08 in) thick. The oscula (exhalent pores) are up to 1.5 mm (0.06 in) in diameter and appear to have membranous lips. They are either flush with the smooth surface or slightly raised. The inhalant pores are tiny and scattered over the surface, giving a net-like effect. The texture is firm and the living sponge is a bright orange-red colour.

== Distribution ==
Clathria aceratoobtusa occurs in the tropical Indo-Pacific region, its range including Myanmar, Malaysia, Thailand, the Philippines, Micronesia and northern Australia.

In the 21st century, it has appeared for the first time in Gulf of Mannar Marine National Park in southern India, where it is causing concern by its invasiveness. At this site it occurs at depths down to about 5.4 m (18 ft).

== Ecology ==
Coral reefs in tropical seas are biodiverse communities where corals, sponges, coralline algae, seaweeds and other organisms compete for space and nutrients. Clathria aceratoobtusa is an encrusting sponge found on reefs growing over the surface of rocks, bivalve molluscs, shell debris, coral colonies and worm tubes. It grows over the surface of corals at the rate of about 1 cm (0.4 in) per month, smothering them; a thin white line of dead tissue separates the healthy coral tissues from the advancing sponge. In India, where this sponge is a non-native, invasive species, the corals most affected by it are Porites, Acropora, Montipora, Favia and especially Turbinaria, which appears to be its favoured substrate. The sponge cannot easily be separated from the coral because it penetrates into the tissues. The corals in the Gulf of Mannar have a tendency to bleach and the sponge may be thriving there because of the corals' weakened state. In Yemen, where the sponge has also expanded its range, the coral most affected is Porites lutea.
