= Clathria pachystyla =

Scientific classification
- Kingdom: Animalia
- Phylum: Porifera
- Class: Demospongiae
- Order: Poecilosclerida
- Family: Microcionidae
- Genus: Clathria
- Subgenus: Clathria
- Species: C. pachystyla

Binomial name
- Clathria pachystyla Lévi, 1963

Species of South African sponge

Clathria pachystyla, the orange finger sponge, is a species of demosponge from the coast of South Africa.

== Description ==
This orange sponge grows in an upright and somewhat fan-shaped form growing up to a length of 170 mm (6.7 in). Fused branches arise from flat blades. It is somewhat compressible and tears with some force.

== Distribution and habitat ==
This species is endemic to South Africa, where it has been recorded at a depth of about 62 m (203 ft).
