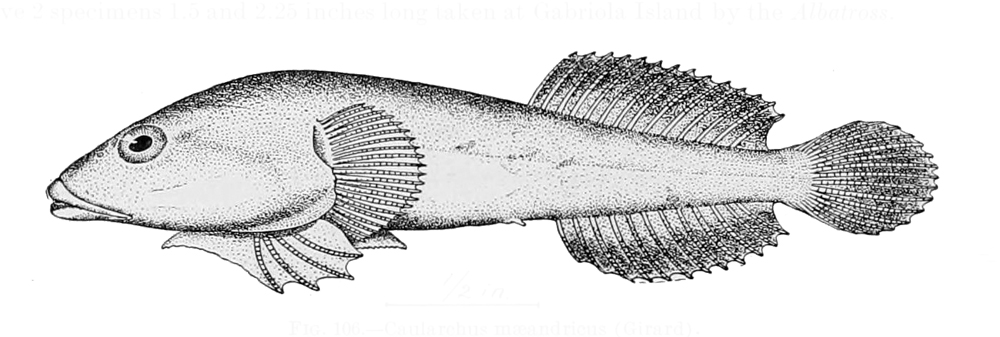
- Gobiesox maeandricus

Scientific classification
- Kingdom: Animalia
- Phylum: Chordata
- Class: Actinopterygii
- Order: Blenniiformes
- Family: Gobiesocidae
- Subfamily: Gobiesocinae
- Genus: Gobiesox; Lacépède, 1800

Type species
- Gobiesox cephalus Lacépède, 1800

= Gobiesox =

Genus of fishes

Gobiesox is a genus of clingfishes found in the Americas, including offshore islands. Most species inhabit coastal marine and brackish waters, but G. lanceolatus is a deep-water species found at a depth of around 300 m (980 ft), and seven species (G. cephalus, G. fluviatilis, G. fulvus, G. juniperoserrai, G. juradoensis, G. mexicanus and G. potamius) are from fast-flowing rivers and streams. These seven are the only known freshwater clingfish.

The genus includes both widespread and common species, and more restricted species that are virtually unknown. Three freshwater species that are endemic to Mexico (G. fluviatilis, G. juniperoserrai and G. mexicanus) are considered threatened by Mexican authorities, and three species that are endemic to small offshore islands (G aethus and G. canidens of the Revillagigedo Islands, and G. woodsi of Cocos Island) are considered vulnerable by the IUCN.

Gobiesox are small fish, mostly less than 7 cm (2.8 in), but at up to 15 cm (5.9 in) in standard length the largest species are among the largest clingfish.

== Species ==
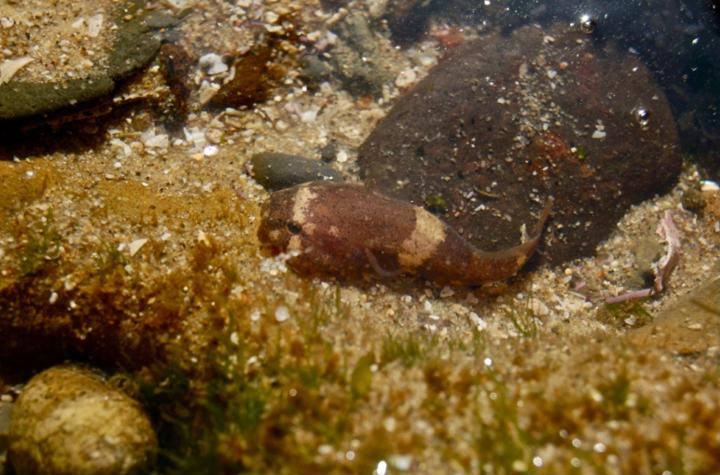
Gobiesox rhessodon

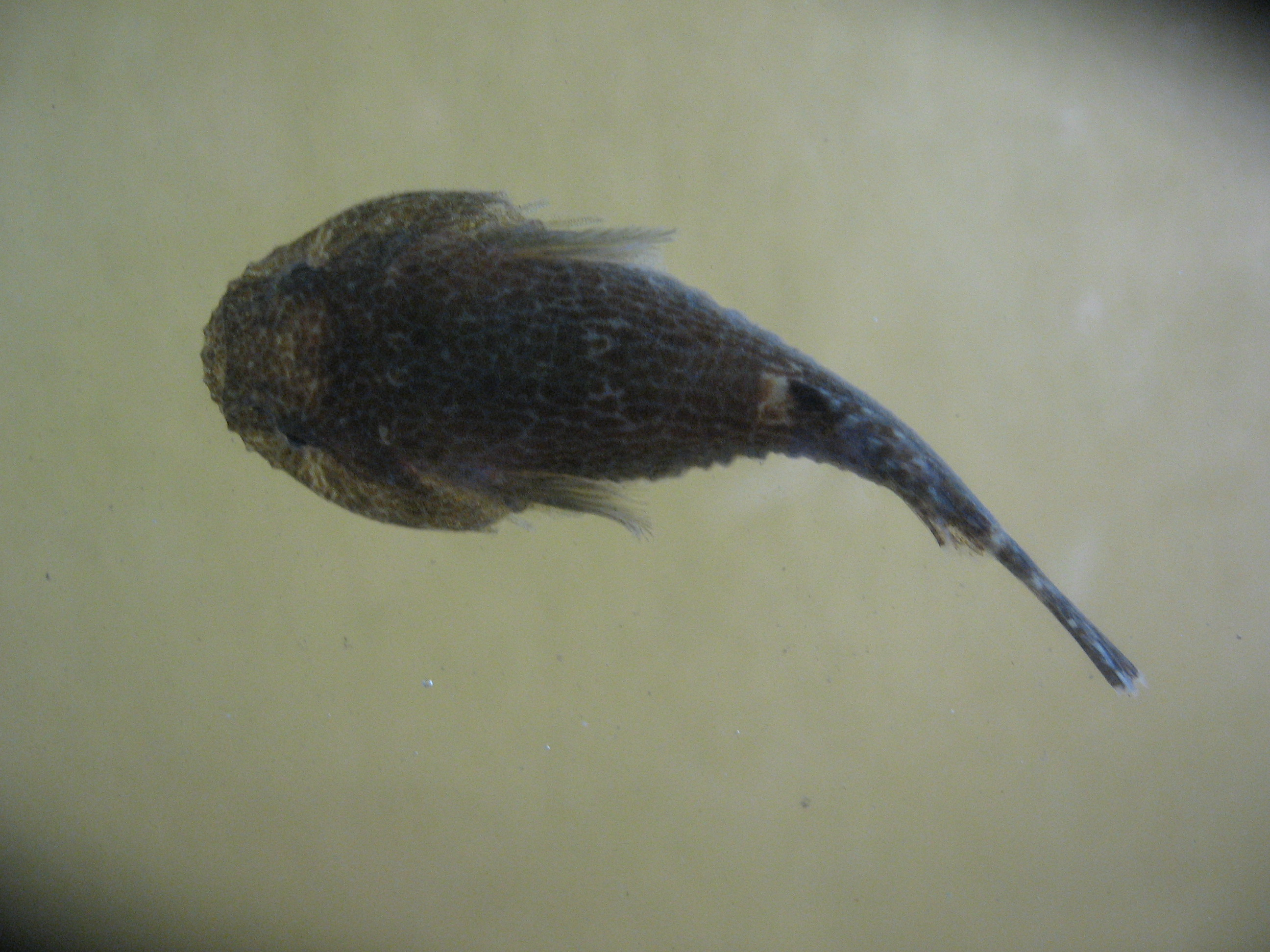
Gobiesox strumosus

There are currently 30 recognized species in this genus. However, genetic studies have shown that Pherallodiscus should be merged into Gobiesox (adding two species to Gobiesox).

- Gobiesox adustus D. S. Jordan & C. H. Gilbert, 1882 (Panamic clingfish)
- Gobiesox aethus (Briggs, 1951) (Clarion clingfish)
- Gobiesox barbatulus Starks, 1913 (Lappet-lip clingfish)
- Gobiesox canidens (Briggs, 1951) (Socorro clingfish)
- Gobiesox cephalus Lacépède, 1800
- Gobiesox crassicorpus (Briggs, 1951)
- Gobiesox daedaleus Briggs, 1951
- Gobiesox eugrammus Briggs, 1955 (Lined clingfish)
- Gobiesox fluviatilis Briggs & R. R. Miller, 1960 (Mountain clingfish)
- Gobiesox fulvus Meek, 1907
- Gobiesox juniperoserrai Espinosa-Pérez & Castro-Aguirre, 1996 (Peninsular clingfish)
- Gobiesox juradoensis Fowler, 1944
- Gobiesox lanceolatus Hastings & Conway, 2017 (Canyon clingfish)
- Gobiesox lucayanus Briggs, 1963 (Bahama clingfish)
- Gobiesox maeandricus (Girard, 1858) (Northern clingfish)
- Gobiesox marijeanae Briggs, 1960 (Lonely clingfish)
- Gobiesox marmoratus L. Jenyns, 1842
- Gobiesox mexicanus Briggs & R. R. Miller, 1960 (Mexican clingfish)
- Gobiesox milleri Briggs, 1955
- Gobiesox multitentaculus (Briggs, 1951)
- Gobiesox nigripinnis (W. K. H. Peters, 1859) (Black-finned clingfish)
- Gobiesox papillifer C. H. Gilbert, 1890 (Bearded clingfish)
- Gobiesox pinniger C. H. Gilbert, 1890
- Gobiesox potamius Briggs, 1955
- Gobiesox punctulatus (Poey, 1876) (Stippled clingfish)
- Gobiesox rhessodon R. S. Eigenmann, 1881 (California clingfish)
- Gobiesox schultzi Briggs, 1951 (Smooth-lip clingfish)
- Gobiesox stenocephalus Briggs, 1955
- Gobiesox strumosus Cope, 1870
- Gobiesox woodsi (L. P. Schultz, 1944) (Woods' clingfish)
