= Northern Pacific Gyre Oscillation =

Climate index

The Northern Pacific Gyre Oscillation (NPGO) is a newer recognized climate index used to describe and pair changes in salinity and nutrients, not previously well correlated to the Pacific Decadal Oscillation (PDO). First described in 2008 by Di Lorenzo et al. the NPGO index reflects changes in wind stress along the California Current System, allowing it to more easily couple with local upwelling trends (and consequent nutrient and phytoplankton blooms). Named to reflect the changes in the branches of the North Pacific gyres circulation, the NPGO could be argued to represent the oceanic expression of the atmospheric variability of the North Pacific Oscillation.

Behind the PDO, the NPGO is defined as the second most important factor in modeling the variability of Sea Surface Height anomaly (SSHa) and Sea Surface Temperature anomaly (SSTa) in the Northeast Pacific. The NPGO in its positive phase shows a pair of counter-rotating gyres (unlike the PDO's singular large gyre) bifurcated by the North Pacific Current along ~40˚N. This allows the NPGO to more accurately represent transport strengthening in the positive phase across both the Alaskan Coastal Current and California Current (due to geostrophic circulation). Thus when the NPGO is positive, upwelling-favorable conditions are seen in the California Current and Alaskan Gyre, while downwelling-favorable conditions are seen in the Subtropical Gyre and the Alaskan Coastal Current. Notably these conditions are more highly correlated south of 38˚N (California and south), while the PDO still plays a predominant role in determining alongshore wind impact on Alaskan upwelling.

The NPGO has global impacts outside of the Eastern North Pacific. Its secondary role in modeling SSTa suggest that tropically coupled dynamics could play a driving role in NPGO fluctuations. It is quite possible that with continuing climate change the NPGO can aid in determining underlying drivers of decadal ecosystem variability across the entire Pacific.
