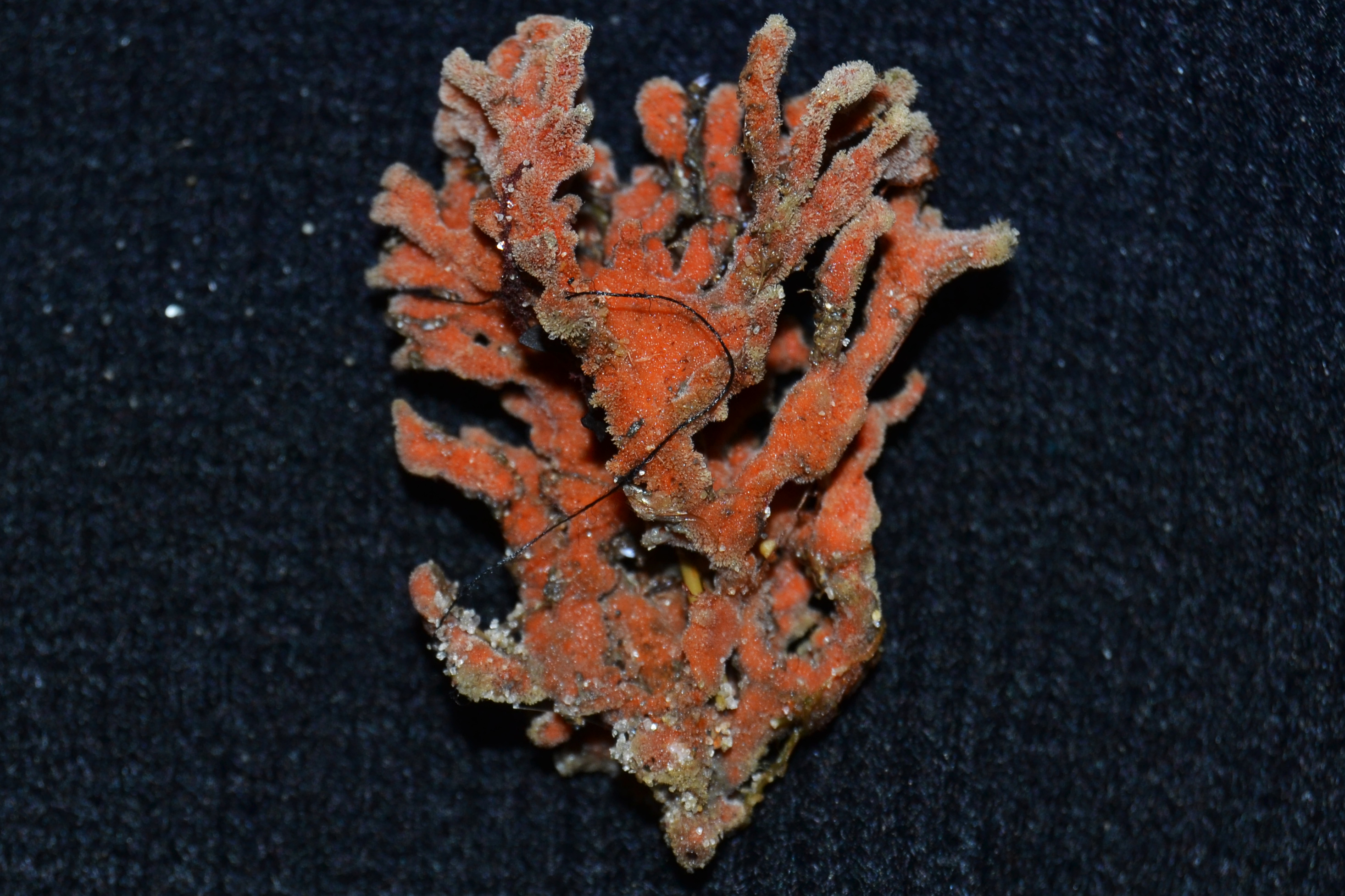

Conservation status
- Secure (NatureServe)

Scientific classification
- Kingdom: Animalia
- Phylum: Porifera
- Class: Demospongiae
- Order: Poecilosclerida
- Family: Microcionidae
- Genus: Clathria
- Subgenus: Clathria
- Species: C. prolifera

Binomial name
- Clathria prolifera (Ellis & Solander, 1786)

Synonyms
- List: Clathria delicata Lambe, 1896; Clathria prolifera (Ellis & Solander, 1786); Microciona prolifera (Ellis & Solander, 1786); Spongia ostracina Rafinesque, 1818; Spongia prolifera Ellis & Solander, 1786; Spongia urceolata Desor, 1851

= Clathria prolifera =

Species of sponge

Clathria prolifera, commonly known as red beard sponge, is a species of sea sponge in the family Microcionidae. It is native to shallow water habitats in the western Atlantic Ocean from Prince Edward Island southwards to Florida and Mexico, and possibly Brazil. In the twentieth century it also became established on the west coast of the United States.

== Description ==
Clathria prolifera has an encrusting base that may be up to 20 cm (8 in) across but less than 3 mm (0.12 in) thick. It forms bushy masses up to 20 cm (8 in) tall of orange or red branches up to 6 mm (0.24 in) thick. These resemble fingers, or may join together to form fan-like or drapery-like folded sheets. The spongy surface is covered with minute pores through which water is drawn into the sponge.

== Distribution and habitat ==
This sponge was first described by the British naturalist John Ellis and the Swedish naturalist Daniel Solander from New Jersey in 1786. It is found on the western side of the Atlantic Ocean from Nova Scotia and Prince Edward Island southwards to Florida, Mexico and Brazil. However, in the southern part of this range it may in fact be a different species. It was first recorded in the eastern Pacific Ocean in San Francisco Bay, California, in the 1940s, in Willapa Bay, Washington state in 1967, and in Humboldt Bay, California, in 1989. It may have arrived in the Pacific as a fouling organism on a vessel's hull or as part of a shipment of oyster spat. It grows on the underside of rocks and boulders in the intertidal and subtidal zones, on docks and quays, and in oyster beds. It is found in estuaries, bays and harbours where it can survive in waters with salinities as low as 15 ppt.

== Ecology ==
Like other sponges, Clathria prolifera draws in water through its pores and filters out planktonic particles on which it feeds. Larvae are released in the summer and autumn, at first they rise to the surface but after a day or so they sink to the bottom and crawl across the substrate until they find suitable locations for settlement. The juvenile sponges are encrusting at first.

Clathria prolifera is sometimes used as a model organism. Samples gathered from Chesapeake Bay housed a diverse assemblage of bacteria including members of the phyla Pseudomonadota, Bacteroidota, Actinomycetota and "Cyanobacteria" that was different to the bacteria in the surrounding water. After the sponge had been grown in aquaculture for six months, the composition of the associated bacteria had changed significantly.
