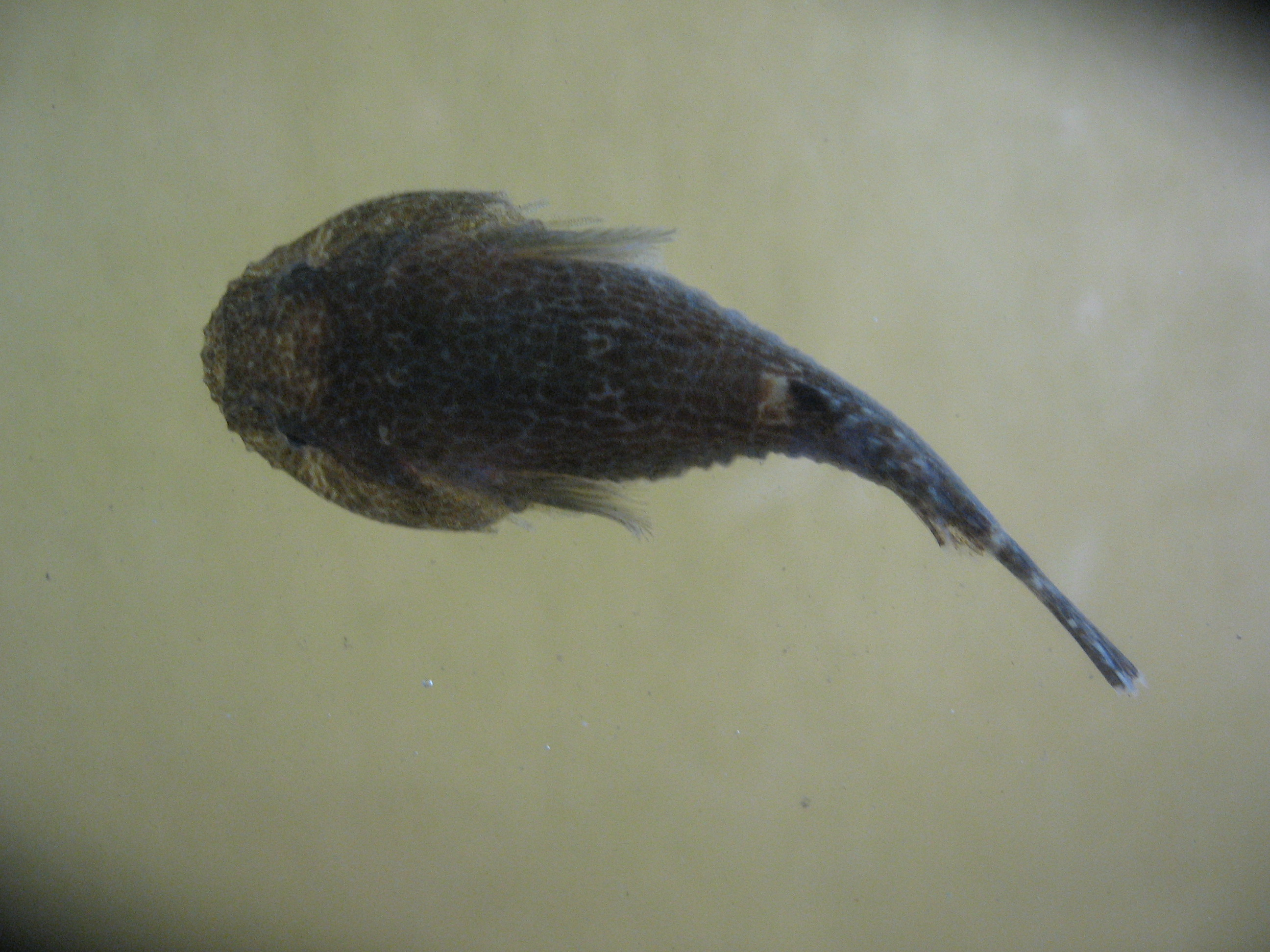

Conservation status
- Least Concern (IUCN 3.1)

Scientific classification
- Kingdom: Animalia
- Phylum: Chordata
- Class: Actinopterygii
- Division: Teleostei
- Order: Blenniiformes
- Family: Gobiesocidae
- Genus: Gobiesox
- Species: G. strumosus

Binomial name
- Gobiesox strumosus Cope, 1870

= Gobiesox strumosus =

Skilletfish

Species of fish

The skilletfish (Gobiesox strumosus) is a member of the family Gobiesocidae, composed of clingfishes. These are mainly marine, tropical and temperate fishes characterized by a powerful sucking disk on the underside of the forebody.

== Description ==
The skilletfish has a frying pan-shaped body which can grow to about 3 inches in length. The body is compressed dorsoventrally, with the head being wider than the body. Tiny eyes are located on top of the head. The fish has strong teeth and fleshy lips. Their color varies from a pale gray to dark brown with a mottled pattern. About six faint lines radiate from the eye. The fish has a dark band at the base of its rounded tail fin. Modified pelvic fins form a large suction disc on the underside of the body. The dorsal and ventral fins are set fairly far back on the body.

== Diet ==
Skilletfish primarily feed on bristle worms and small crustaceans such as amphipods and isopods.

== Habitat ==
This fish usually lives among oyster reefs, but may also be found within eelgrass beds. It stays in shallow waters as deep as 1 m near the shore during warmer months, but will move to deeper waters as deep as 33 m in winter. It almost always clings to rocks or shells with its suction disc.

== Reproduction and life cycle ==
Skilletfish spawning occurs between April and August. The female will lay a few hundred sticky, amber-colored eggs into an empty oyster shell, which the male will protect until they hatch. Upon hatching, the fish is 2.4–3.4 mm long. It generally grows about 9 mm during development, eventually reaching 40–45 mm long when it is time for the first reproduction.

== Distribution ==
The skilletfish can be found in the Western Atlantic: Bermuda, New Jersey and the northern Gulf of Mexico in the US, to southeastern Brazil. It is absent from the Bahamas. It can also be found in the Eastern Central Pacific: coastal lagoons and tidal flats of Sonora, Sinaloa and Nayarit, Mexico. The skilletfish ranges from New Jersey and New York in the northern end of its distribution south to Brazil, also occurring in the West Indies and the Gulf of Mexico.

== Etymology ==
In Latin, Gobiesox means "gobius", which can equate to "gudgeon". Strumosus contains the Latin word struma, which refers to a swelling or tumor.
