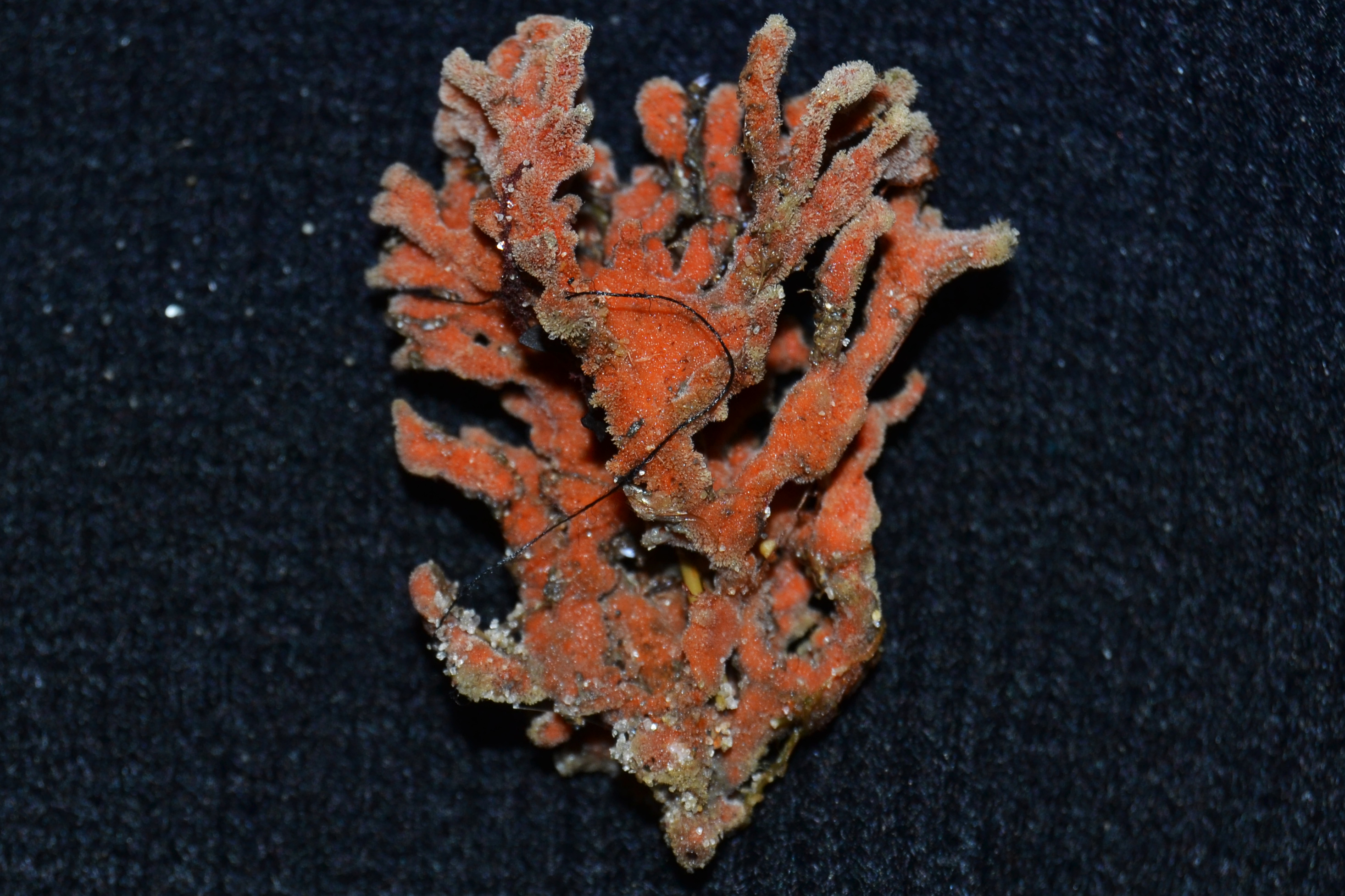
- Clathria prolifera

Scientific classification
- Kingdom: Animalia
- Phylum: Porifera
- Class: Demospongiae
- Order: Poecilosclerida
- Family: Microcionidae
- Genus: Clathria
- Subgenus: Clathria; Schmidt, 1862

Type species
- Clathria compressa Schmidt, 1862

Species
- see text

Synonyms
- List: Allocia Hallmann, 1920; Antherochalina Lendenfeld, 1887; Dictyociona Topsent, 1913; Labacea de Laubenfels, 1936; Ligrota de Laubenfels, 1936; Litaspongia de Laubenfels, 1954; Marleyia Burton, 1931; Pitalia Gray, 1867; Ramoses de Laubenfels, 1936; Thalyseurypon de Laubenfels, 1936

= Clathria (Clathria) =

Subgenus of sponges

Clathria (Clathria) is a subgenus of demosponge in the family Microcionidae.

== Species ==
Species in the subgenus include (130):

- Clathria (Clathria) acanthostyli (Hoshino, 1981)
- Clathria (Clathria) acanthotoxa (Stephens, 1916)
- Clathria (Clathria) angulifera Dendy, 1896
- Clathria (Clathria) anthoides Lévi, 1993
- Clathria (Clathria) antyaja (Burton & Rao, 1932)
- Clathria (Clathria) arbuscula (Row, 1911)
- Clathria (Clathria) arcifera (Schmidt, 1868)
- Clathria (Clathria) arcuophora Whitelegge, 1907
- Clathria (Clathria) arroyoi Uriz, 1984
- Clathria (Clathria) asodes (de Laubenfels, 1930)
- Clathria (Clathria) axociona Lévi, 1963
- Clathria (Clathria) barleei (Bowerbank, 1866)
- Clathria (Clathria) basilana Lévi, 1961
- Clathria (Clathria) bergquistae Van Soest & Hooper, 2020
- Clathria (Clathria) biclathrata Hooper in Hooper & Wiedenmayer, 1994
- Clathria (Clathria) borealis Hooper, 1996
- Clathria (Clathria) bulbosa Hooper & Lévi, 1993
- Clathria (Clathria) burtoni Cuartas, 1995
- Clathria (Clathria) caelata Hallmann, 1912
- Clathria (Clathria) calopora Whitelegge, 1907
- Clathria (Clathria) calypso Boury-Esnault, 1973
- Clathria (Clathria) carteri Topsent, 1889
- Clathria (Clathria) chelifera (Hentschel, 1911)
- Clathria (Clathria) compressa Schmidt, 1862
- Clathria (Clathria) conectens (Hallmann, 1912)
- Clathria (Clathria) conica Lévi, 1963
- Clathria (Clathria) contorta (Bergquist & Fromont, 1988)
- Clathria (Clathria) coralloides (Scopoli, 1772)
- Clathria (Clathria) crassa (Lendenfeld, 1887)
- Clathria (Clathria) dayi Lévi, 1963, the broad-bladed tree sponge
- Clathria (Clathria) decumbens Ridley, 1884
- Clathria (Clathria) depressa Sarà & Melone, 1966
- Clathria (Clathria) discreta (Thiele, 1905)
- Clathria (Clathria) echinonematissima (Carter, 1887)
- Clathria (Clathria) elastica Lévi, 1963
- Clathria (Clathria) elegans Vosmaer, 1880
- Clathria (Clathria) faviformis Lehnert & van Soest, 1996
- Clathria (Clathria) foliacea Topsent, 1889
- Clathria (Clathria) foliascens Vacelet & Vasseur, 1971
- Clathria (Clathria) frondiculata (Schmidt, 1864)
- Clathria (Clathria) gageoensis Kim & Sim, 2005
- Clathria (Clathria) gombawuiensis Kim & Sim, 2005
- Clathria (Clathria) gomezae Van Soest, 2017
- Clathria (Clathria) gorgonioides (Dendy, 1916)
- Clathria (Clathria) hexagonopora Lévi, 1963
- Clathria (Clathria) hispidula (Ridley, 1884)
- Clathria (Clathria) hjorti (Arnesen, 1920)
- Clathria (Clathria) hongdoensis Kim & Sim, 2006
- Clathria (Clathria) horrida (Row, 1911)
- Clathria (Clathria) ieoensis Kang & Kim, 2018
- Clathria (Clathria) inanchorata Ridley & Dendy, 1886
- Clathria (Clathria) indica Dendy, 1889
- Clathria (Clathria) inhacensis Thomas, 1979
- Clathria (Clathria) intermedia Kirk, 1911
- Clathria (Clathria) irregularis (Burton, 1931)
- Clathria (Clathria) juncea Burton, 1931
- Clathria (Clathria) koreana Sim & Lee, 1998
- Clathria (Clathria) kylista Hooper & Lévi, 1993
- Clathria (Clathria) laevigata Lambe, 1893
- Clathria (Clathria) lipochela Burton, 1932
- Clathria (Clathria) lissosclera Bergquist & Fromont, 1988
- Clathria (Clathria) lobata Vosmaer, 1880
- Clathria (Clathria) macroisochela Lévi, 1993
- Clathria (Clathria) maeandrina Ridley, 1884
- Clathria (Clathria) marissuperi Pulitzer-Finali, 1983
- Clathria (Clathria) menoui Hooper & Lévi, 1993
- Clathria (Clathria) meyeri (Bowerbank, 1877)
- Clathria (Clathria) microchela (Stephens, 1916)
- Clathria (Clathria) microxa Desqueyroux, 1972
- Clathria (Clathria) mortenseni (Brøndsted, 1924)
- Clathria (Clathria) mosulpia Sim & Byeon, 1989
- Clathria (Clathria) multiformis Samaai, Pillay & Janson, 2019
- Clathria (Clathria) multipes Hallmann, 1912
- Clathria (Clathria) murphyi Hooper, 1996
- Clathria (Clathria) nicoleae Vieira de Barros, Santos & Pinheiro, 2013
- Clathria (Clathria) noarlungae Hooper, 1996
- Clathria (Clathria) obliqua (George & Wilson, 1919)
- Clathria (Clathria) oculata Burton, 1933
- Clathria (Clathria) omegiensis Samaai & Gibbons, 2005
- Clathria (Clathria) oxyphila (Hallmann, 1912)
- Clathria (Clathria) pachystyla Lévi, 1963
- Clathria (Clathria) papillosa Thiele, 1905
- Clathria (Clathria) partita Hallmann, 1912
- Clathria (Clathria) parva Lévi, 1963
- Clathria (Clathria) paucispicula (Burton, 1932)
- Clathria (Clathria) pauper Brøndsted, 1927
- Clathria (Clathria) pellicula Whitelegge, 1897
- Clathria (Clathria) perforata (Lendenfeld, 1887)
- Clathria (Clathria) piniformis (Carter, 1885)
- Clathria (Clathria) plurityla Pulitzer-Finali, 1983
- Clathria (Clathria) priestleyae Goodwin, Berman & Hendry, 2019
- Clathria (Clathria) productitoxa (Hoshino, 1981)
- Clathria (Clathria) prolifera (Ellis & Solander, 1786), the red beard sponge
- Clathria (Clathria) pyramidalis (Brøndsted, 1924)
- Clathria (Clathria) ramsayiensis Samaai, Pillay & Janson, 2019
- Clathria (Clathria) ramus Kang & Kim, 2018
- Clathria (Clathria) raphanus (Lamarck, 1814)
- Clathria (Clathria) rectangulosa Schmidt, 1870
- Clathria (Clathria) rhaphidotoxa Stephens, 1915
- Clathria (Clathria) rubens (Lendenfeld, 1888)
- Clathria (Clathria) sarai Hooper, 1996
- Clathria (Clathria) saraspinifera Hooper, 1996
- Clathria (Clathria) sartaginula (Lamarck, 1814)
- Clathria (Clathria) shirahama Tanita, 1977
- Clathria (Clathria) sohuksanensis Kim & Sim, 2006
- Clathria (Clathria) spinispicula Tanita, 1968
- Clathria (Clathria) spongodes Dendy, 1922
- Clathria (Clathria) squalorum Wiedenmayer in Hooper & Wiedenmayer, 1994
- Clathria (Clathria) striata Whitelegge, 1907
- Clathria (Clathria) stromnessa Goodwin, Brewin & Brickle, 2012
- Clathria (Clathria) terraenovae Dendy, 1924
- Clathria (Clathria) tortuosa Uriz, 1988
- Clathria (Clathria) toxipraedita Topsent, 1913
- Clathria (Clathria) toxistricta Topsent, 1925
- Clathria (Clathria) toxistyla (Sarà, 1959)
- Clathria (Clathria) toxivaria (Sarà, 1959)
- Clathria (Clathria) transiens Hallmann, 1912
- Clathria (Clathria) typica sensu Kirkpatrick, 1903
- Clathria (Clathria) ulmus Vosmaer, 1880
- Clathria (Clathria) unica Cuartas, 1992
- Clathria (Clathria) vasiformis (de Laubenfels, 1953)
- Clathria (Clathria) whiteleggii Dendy, 1922
- Clathria (Clathria) wilsoni Wiedenmayer, 1989
- Clathria (Clathria) zoanthifera Lévi, 1963
