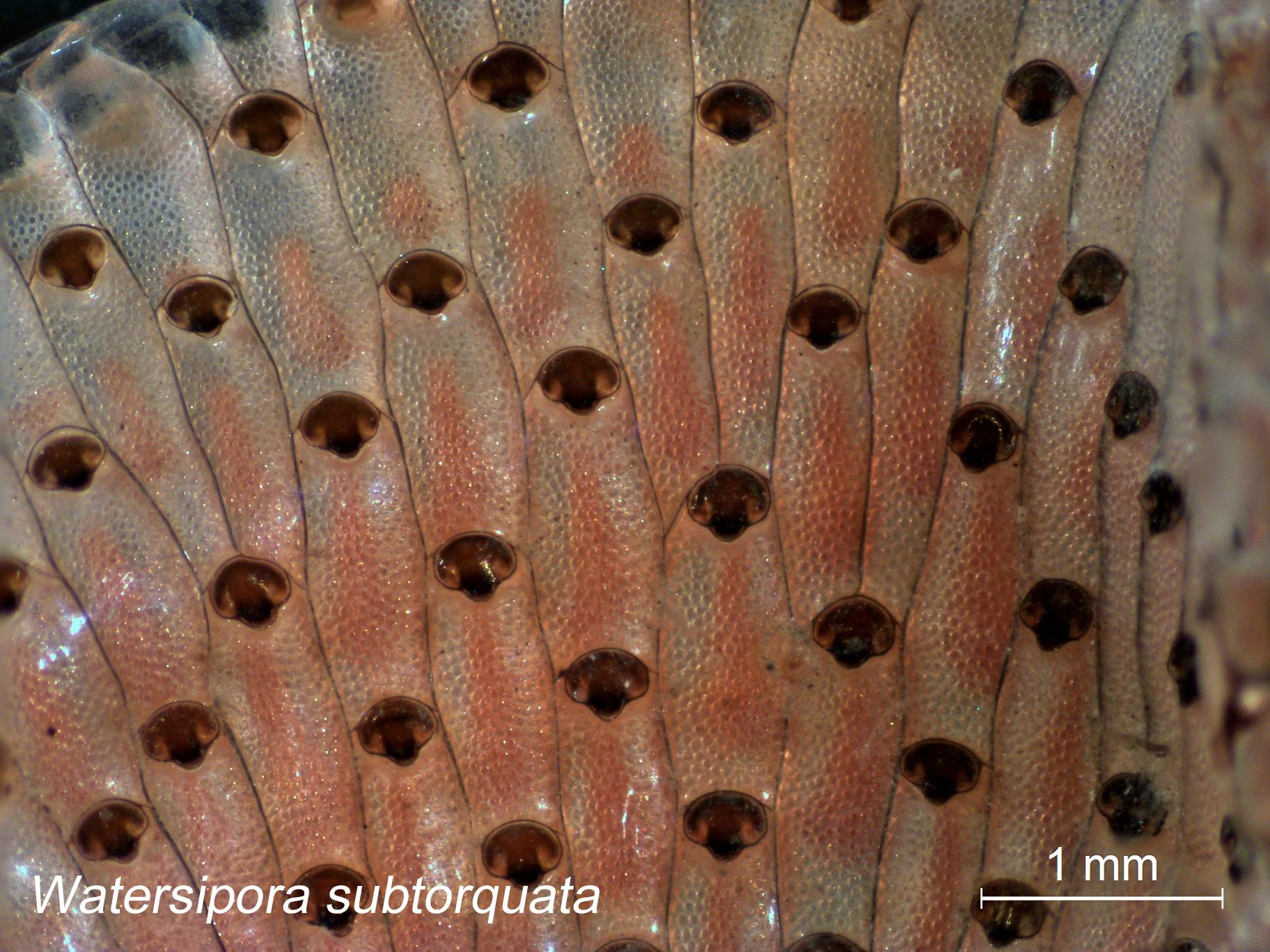

Scientific classification
- Kingdom: Animalia
- Phylum: Bryozoa
- Class: Gymnolaemata
- Order: Cheilostomatida
- Family: Watersiporidae
- Genus: Watersipora
- Species: W. subtorquata

Binomial name
- Watersipora subtorquata (d'Orbigny, 1852)

Synonyms
- Watersipora edmondsoni Soule & Soule, 1968

= Watersipora subtorquata =

Species of moss animal

Watersipora subtorquata, commonly known as the red-rust bryozoan, is a species of colonial bryozoan in the family Watersiporidae. It is unclear from where it originated but it is now present in many warm-water coastal regions throughout the world, and has become invasive on the west coast of North America and in Australia and New Zealand.

== Description ==
On flat surfaces W. subtorquata at first forms small encrusting patches, but as these grow they begin to buckle and fold and overgrow itself, forming foliose (leaf-like) structures in sheltered waters. These can be up to 30 cm (12 in) high and 60 cm (24 in) across. The colonies are usually some shade of orange or red, with varying amounts of black.

The individual soft-bodied units in the colony are called zooids and are enclosed in coffin-shaped boxes called zoecia composed of mineralized material. These are arranged neatly, radiating out from where the colony originated. Each zooecium in W. subtorquata is between 0.75 and 1.5 mm (0.03 and 0.06 in) long and 0.3 to 0.7 mm (0.01 to 0.03 in) wide, and the specialised feeding apparatus, the lophophore, of the zooid can protrude through an aperture at the end of the zooecium away from the centre of the colony. The lophophore has about twenty orange tentacles. A hinged lid called the operculum closes this aperture when the lophophore is retracted; the operculum is often black.

== Distribution and habitat ==
W. subtorquata has a global distribution in warm seas. It is not clear where it originated and whether it is just one species or several. It had become established in southern Australia by 1972 and New Zealand ten years later. Curiously, it had been recorded in Australia in 1947 and in New Zealand in 1959 and in both cases initially thrived but later declined and died out. It is a fouling organism and is invasive on the Pacific coast of North America, where it can frequently be found in harbours and estuaries on the coasts of California and Oregon. W. subtorquata can grow on rocks, shells, buoys, pilings, docks, kelp and the hulls of vessels. It is tolerant to copper and may grow on ships hulls painted with anti-fouling, copper-based paint, and may then be overlaid by other, less copper-tolerant fouling organisms.

== Ecology ==
The zooids of W. subtorquata extend their lophophores into the water to catch the small organic particles on which they feed; cilia on the tentacles then waft the food particles towards the central mouth. W. subtorquata is a hermaphrodite; sperm are liberated into the water and drawn into other zooids where they fertilises the eggs. The larvae are red and are at first brooded inside the zoecia. When liberated into the sea they soon settle, undergo a profound metamorphosis and start new colonies.
