= Diodon eydouxii =

Pelagic porcupinefish

Scientific classification
- Kingdom: Animalia
- Phylum: Chordata
- Class: Actinopterygii
- Division: Teleostei
- Order: Tetraodontiformes
- Family: Diodontidae
- Genus: Diodon
- Species: D. eydouxii

Binomial name
- Diodon eydouxii Brisout de Barneville, 1846

Synonyms
- Diodon melanopsis Kaup, 1855; Diodon bertolettii de Lema, de Lucena, Saenger & De Oliveira, 1979

Species of fish

Diodon eydouxii, commonly known as the pelagic porcupinefish, is a species of porcupinefish with a circumtropical marine distribution.

== Description ==
Diodon eydouxii can be distinguished from many related species by its coloration. While its underside is silver to white in color, its back and sides are typically noticeably blue, with numerous small dark spots. The species is smaller than many of its congeners, reaching around 27 cm (11 in) in total length. The blue coloration, comparatively fusiform body, smaller size, and falcate fins of D. eydouxii are believed to be adaptations to its open-water environment, distinguishing it from nonpelagic (except as juveniles) species such as Diodon hystrix.

== Distribution and habitat ==
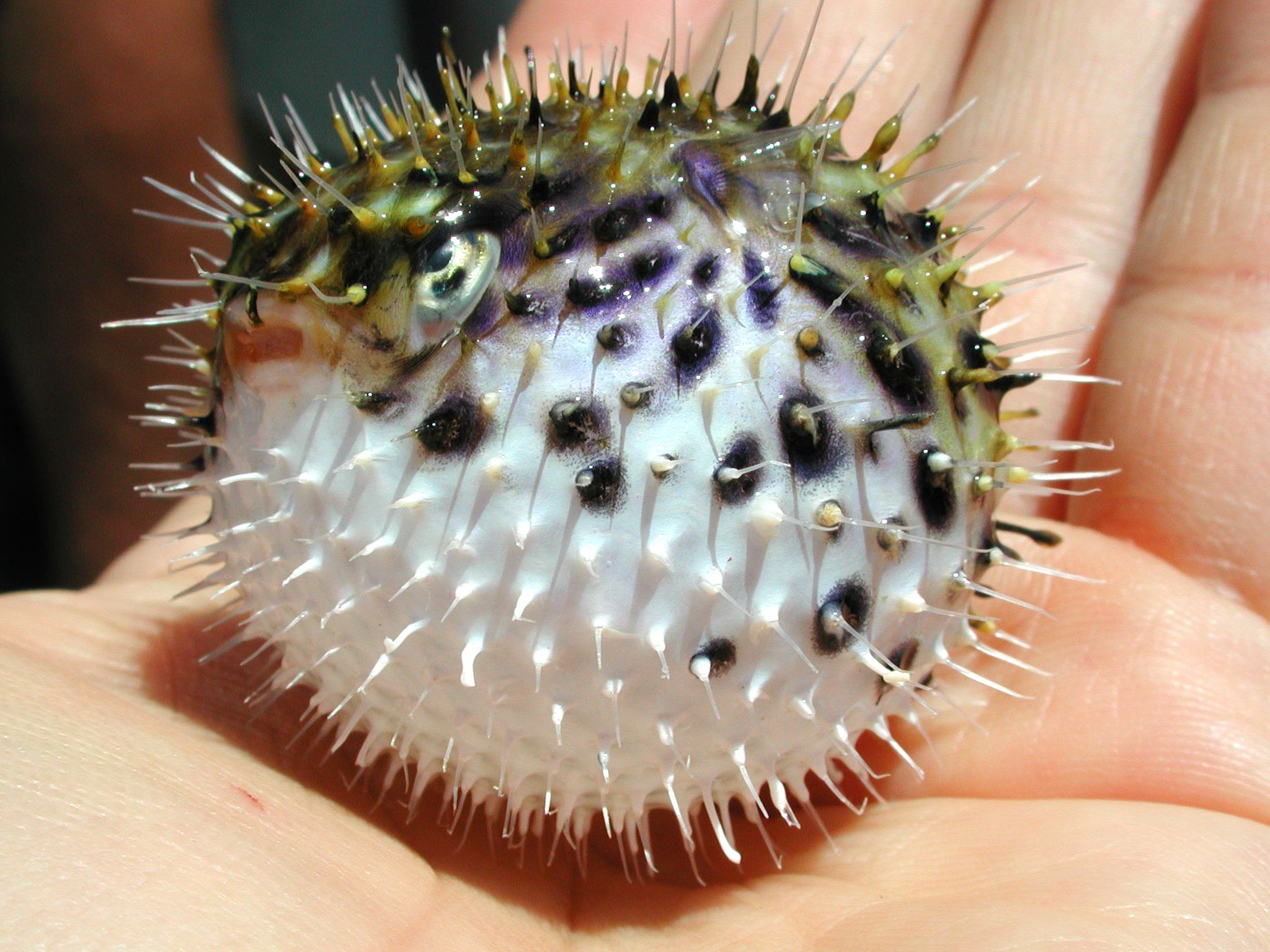
Juvenile caught with a plankton net in the South Atlantic Bight

Diodon eydouxii is known from the Atlantic, Pacific, and Indian Oceans, where it typically occurs in warm, tropical areas with a water temperature between 23.1 and 29.1 °C (73.6 and 84.4 °F). Unusually among members of the family Diodontidae, and unusually among members of Tetraodontiformes in general, it is a pelagic fish in all stages of its lifecycle. It is typically found at depths of 0 to 10 m (0 to 33 ft).

== Ecology ==
Diodon eydouxii is known to be a schooling species, distinguishing it from many tetraodontiform fish which are often solitary. It reportedly feeds on ichthyoplankton and other larger zooplankton.

== Relationship with humans ==
Diodon eydouxii is known to be of some importance to minor commercial fisheries. It occasionally appears in the aquarium trade.
