= Slender-spined porcupine fish =

Scientific classification
- Kingdom: Animalia
- Phylum: Chordata
- Class: Actinopterygii
- Division: Teleostei
- Order: Tetraodontiformes
- Family: Diodontidae
- Genus: Diodon
- Species: D. nicthemerus

Binomial name
- Diodon nicthemerus G. Cuvier, 1818

Synonyms
- Atopomycterus nichthemerus (Cuvier, 1818); Diodon nycthemerus Cuvier, 1818

Species of fish

The slender-spined porcupine fish or globefish (Diodon nicthemerus) is a porcupinefish of the family Diodontidae, found in the waters of southern Australia, as far north as Port Jackson to Geraldton, Western Australia. It is most common in Port Phillip Bay and the coastal waters of Tasmania in shallow coastal waters and under manmade jetties. It is known to occur at a depth range of 1 to 70 m (3 to 230 ft).

== Description ==
At Perth, Western Australia

Diodon nicthemerus is similar in appearance and size to the three-bar porcupinefish (Dicotylichthys punctulatus), with both species reaching around 40 cm (15.7 inches) in total length, although patterning and morphology can differentiate the two. It is nocturnal, occasionally forms small groups, and feeds on benthic zone invertebrates. It possesses slender yellow spines used for defence against predators and has the ability to inflate its body so its sharp spines protrude when alarmed.

== Gallery ==
In captivity

Schooling

At Victoria, Australia
