= Kyrtogymnodon =

Kyrtogymnodon Temporal range: Pliocene

Scientific classification
- Kingdom: Animalia
- Phylum: Chordata
- Class: Actinopterygii
- Division: Teleostei
- Order: Tetraodontiformes
- Family: Diodontidae
- Genus: †Kyrtogymnodon; Tavani, 1955
- Species: †K. capellini

Binomial name
- †Kyrtogymnodon capellini (de Stefano, 1910)

Extinct genus of fishes

Kyrtogymnodon is an extinct genus of prehistoric porcupinefish that lived during the Pliocene epoch of Europe. It contains a single species, K. capellini from Italy. It can be distinguished from other porcupinefish by the arched occlusal surface of its tooth plates, and may be related to the earlier genus Progymnodon. An alleged earlier record of this genus from the Eocene of the eastern United States is now thought to represent an aberrant tooth plate of the bonefish relative Phyllodus.

== See also ==
- Prehistoric fish
- List of prehistoric bony fish
