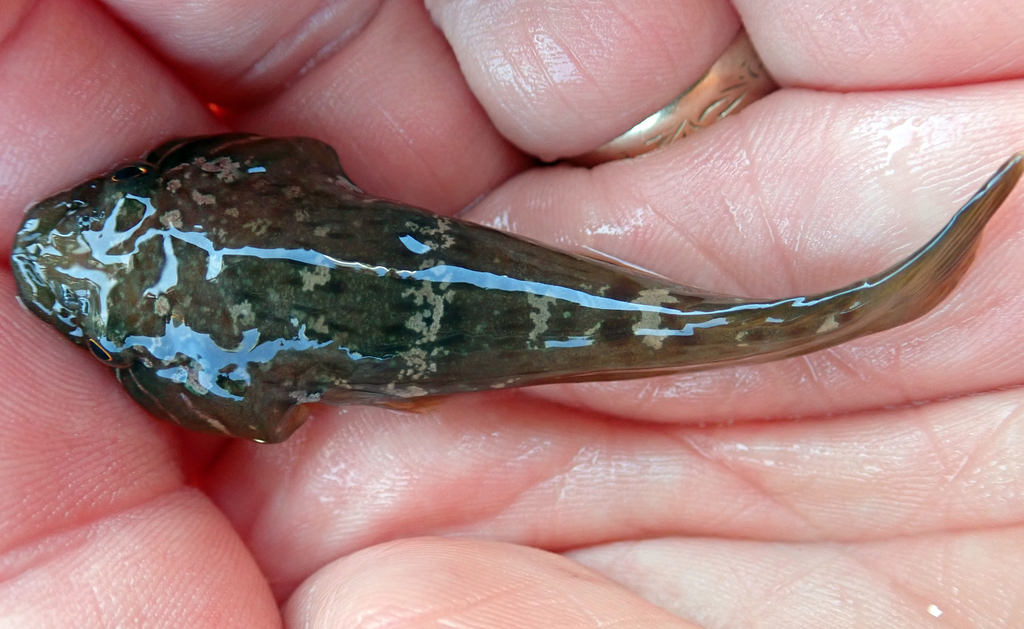
- New Zealand lumpfish Trachelochismus pinnatus

Scientific classification
- Kingdom: Animalia
- Phylum: Chordata
- Class: Actinopterygii
- Division: Teleostei
- Order: Blenniiformes
- Family: Gobiesocidae
- Subfamily: Gobiesocinae
- Genus: Trachelochismus; Brisout de Barneville, 1846

Type species
- Cyclopterus pinnulatus Forster, 1844

= Trachelochismus =

Genus of fishes

Trachelochismus is a genus of clingfishes endemic to the shores of New Zealand, with currently three recognized species:

- Trachelochismus aestuarium Conway, Stewart & King 2017
- Trachelochismus melobesia Phillipps, 1927 (striped clingfish)
- Trachelochismus pinnulatus (J. R. Forster, 1801)
