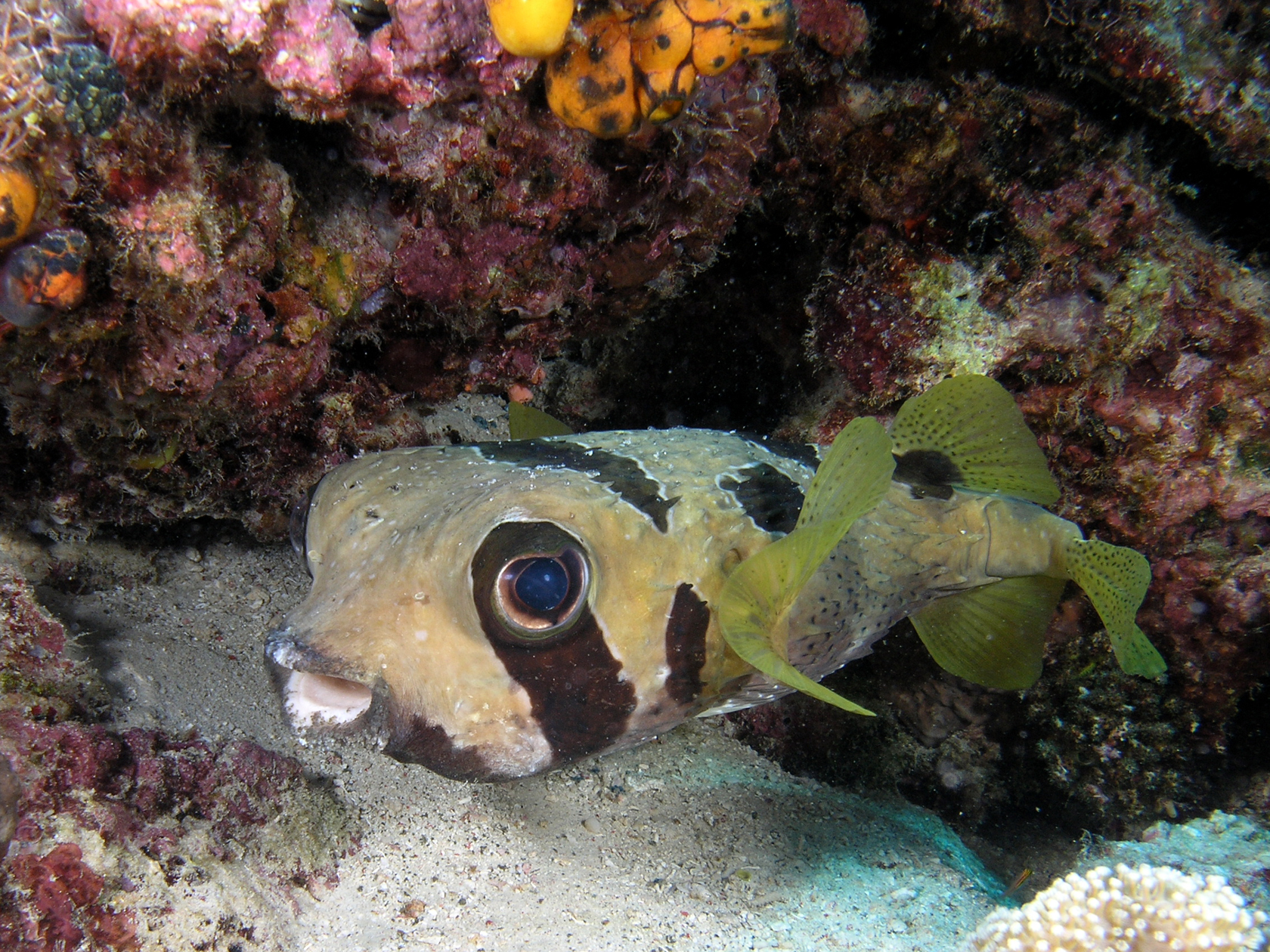

Scientific classification
- Kingdom: Animalia
- Phylum: Chordata
- Class: Actinopterygii
- Division: Teleostei
- Order: Tetraodontiformes
- Family: Diodontidae
- Genus: Diodon
- Species: D. liturosus

Binomial name
- Diodon liturosus G. Shaw, 1804

= Black-blotched porcupinefish =

Species of fish

The black-blotched porcupinefish (Diodon liturosus), also known as shortspine porcupinefish, is a member of the family Diodontidae. It is found in the tropical and subtropical waters of the Indo-Pacific on coral and rocky reefs and in inshore waters. Other names are the blotched porcupinefish and the brown-backed porcupinefish.

== Distribution and habitat ==
The Black-blotched porcupinefish is found in the tropical and subtropical waters of the Indo-Pacific area from eastern coasts of Africa to Japan, the Society Islands and Western Australia, and also the southeast of the Atlantic Ocean on the coast of South Africa.

Adults favour lagoons, top reefs and seaward coral or rocky reefs from one to 90 m depth, but it is usually found between 15 and 30 m.

== Description ==
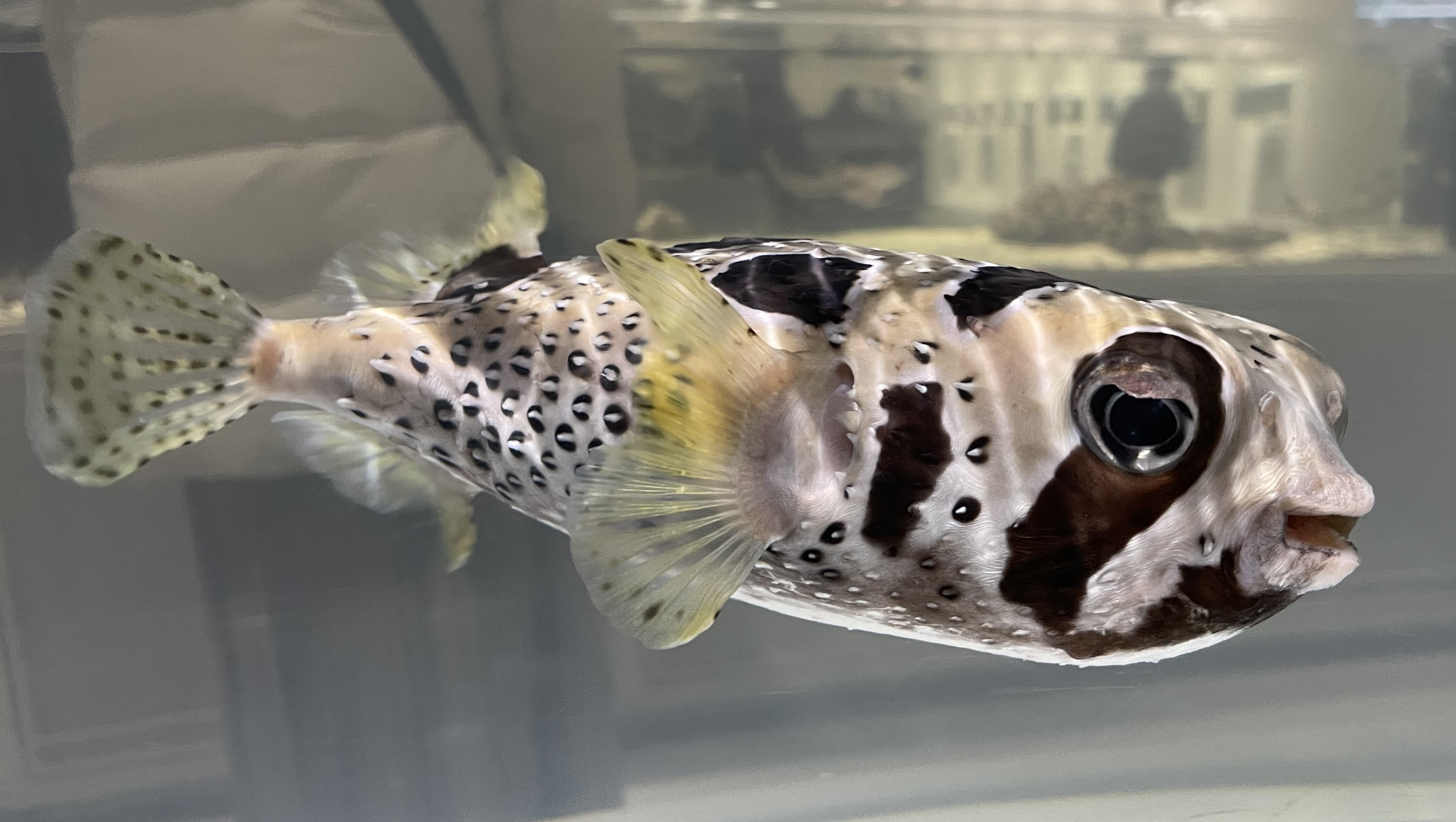
At NIFREL aquarium in Osaka, Japan

The Black-blotched porcupinefish is a medium-sized fish which grows up to 65 cm (26 in), but the average size most likely to be observed is 45 cm (18 in). Its body is elongated with a spherical head with big round protruding eyes and a large mouth that is rarely closed. The pectoral fins are large, the pelvic fins are absent, the anal and dorsal fins are close to the caudal peduncle. The latter move simultaneously during swimming. All fins are a uniform tint of white or yellowish without any spotting. The skin is smooth and firm, the scales are modified into spines directed towards the back. The body coloration is light brown to sandy-yellow with dark blotches circled with a white line and pale ventral surface. The only other fish with which it might be confused is the long-spine porcupinefish, (Diodon holocanthus) but it has much shorter spines and it lacks a dark streak running between the eyes.

== Biology ==
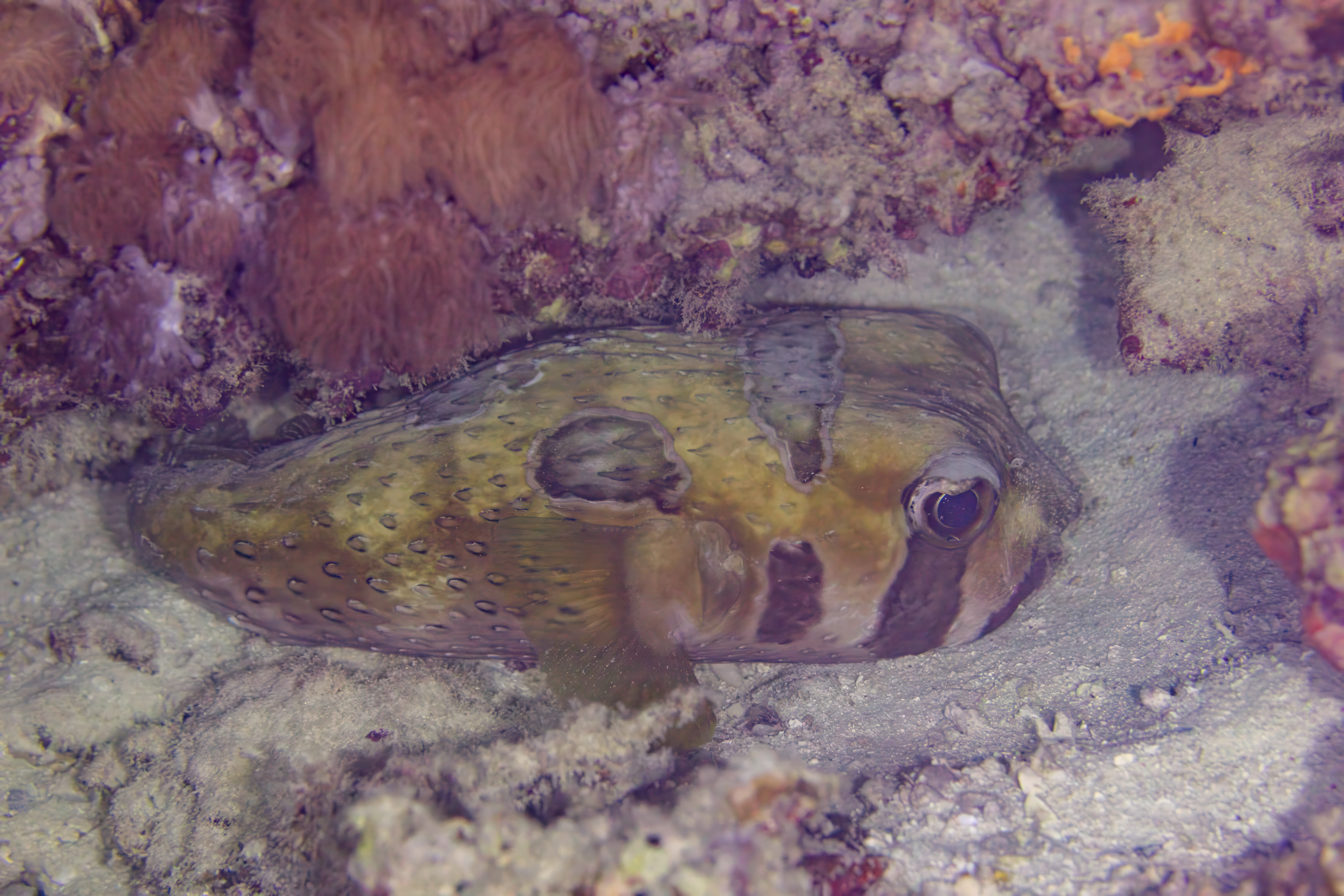
In Tanzania

In case of danger, the porcupinefish can inflate itself by swallowing water to deter the potential predator with its larger volume and it can raise its spines defensively.

The porcupinefish concentrates a poison, called tetrodotoxin, in certain parts of its body such as the liver, skin, gonads and the viscera. Tetrodotoxin is a powerful neurotoxin. This defensive system constitutes an additional device to dissuade the potential predators.

At the Great Barrier Reef

The porcupinefish's diet is based on Sea urchins, gastropods and crustaceans.

This fish is solitary, except during mating periods, it has a nocturnal activity with a maximal activity at sunset and sunrise. During the day it normally hides in caves or under ledges.
