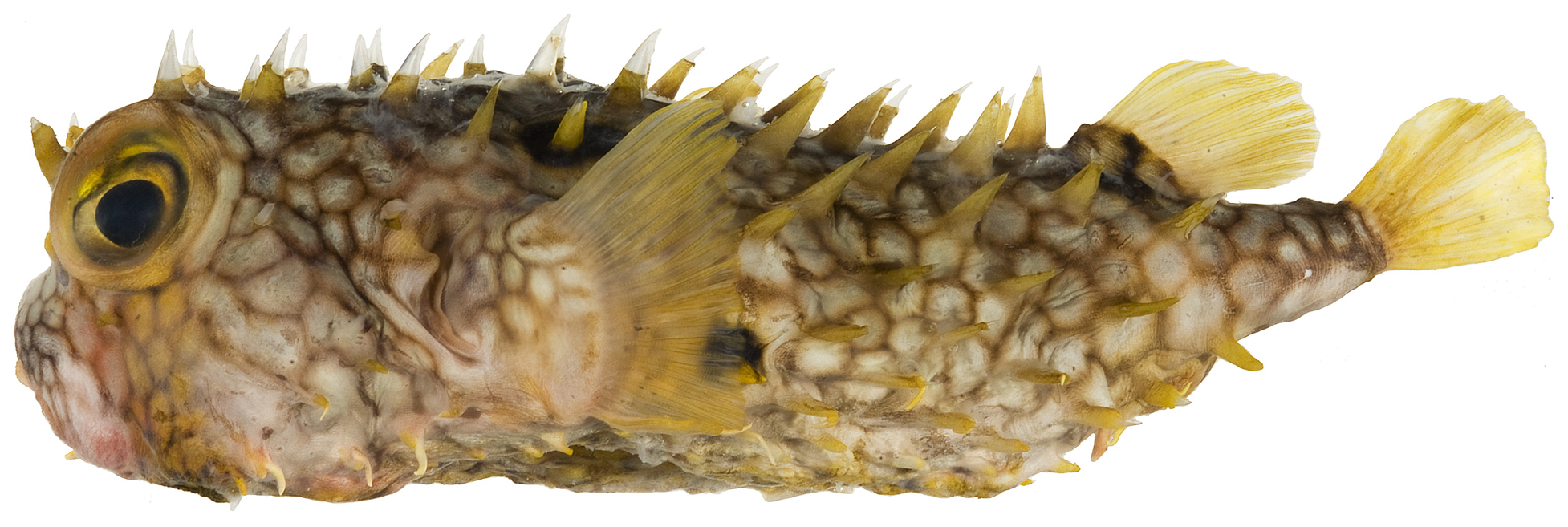

Conservation status
- Least Concern (IUCN 3.1)

Scientific classification
- Kingdom: Animalia
- Phylum: Chordata
- Class: Actinopterygii
- Division: Teleostei
- Order: Tetraodontiformes
- Family: Diodontidae
- Genus: Chilomycterus
- Species: C. antillarum

Binomial name
- Chilomycterus antillarum D. S. Jordan & Rutter, 1897

= Chilomycterus antillarum =

Species of fish

Chilomycterus antillarum, the web burrfish, spiny box puffer, bridled burrfish or striped burrfish, is a species of fish in the family Diodontidae native to the Western Atlantic Ocean, southern Florida, and the Bahamas to Brazil. The species can grow up to 12 inches in length.

In the Caribbean Sea

== In captivity ==
Spiny box puffers are not recommended for the novice aquarist, as they are difficult to adjust to captive fare. They require a minimum 75 gallon aquarium, with high water quality (SG 1.020 - 1.025, pH 8.1 - 8.4, Temp. 72 - 78 °F). Their diet consists of mollusks and other meaty, live foods. They must be fed shellfish since their beaks grow throughout their life, or they will starve. Like other puffers they inflate themselves with water to escape capture, do not force them to do this as it will cause stress.
