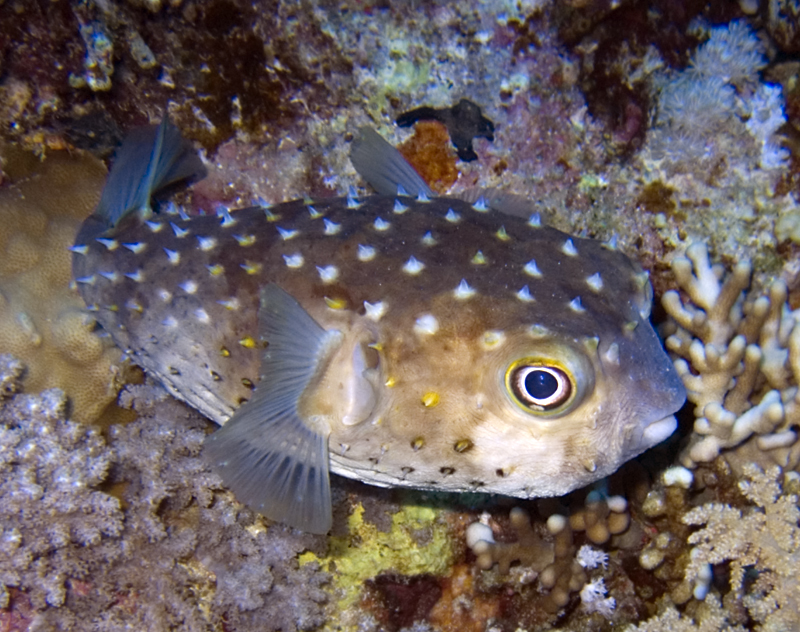
- In the Red Sea

Scientific classification
- Kingdom: Animalia
- Phylum: Chordata
- Class: Actinopterygii
- Division: Teleostei
- Order: Tetraodontiformes
- Family: Diodontidae
- Genus: Cyclichthys
- Species: C. spilostylus

Binomial name
- Cyclichthys spilostylus (Leis & J. E. Randall, 1982)

Synonyms
- List: Cyclicthys spilostylos (Leis & Randall, 1982); Chilomycterus spilostylus Leis & Randall, 1982; Cyclichthys echinatus (non Linnaeus, 1758)

= Spotbase burrfish =

Species of fish

Cyclichthys spilostylus, known commonly as the spotbase burrfish or yellowspotted burrfish, is a species of marine fish in the family Diodontidae.

== Distribution ==
This species can be found from the Red Sea to South Africa and east to southern Japan, the Philippines, Australia and New Caledonia. Also found around the Galapagos Islands and now seen in rare instances in the eastern Mediterranean Sea.

== Habitat ==
The Spotbase burrfish is found in coastal waters near and around reefs at depths of 3m – 90m. It lives in seagrass habitats and coastal slopes with sponges. It is usually found under rock or coral ledges during the day and is active during the night, generally being solitary in nature. Juveniles are pelagic.

== Description ==
Cyclichthys spilostylus can reach a length of 34 cm. These fishes have short, rigid spines over the body. They have 11-13 dorsal soft rays and 10-12 anal soft rays. The colouration of the body is dusky above and light below, the spines arising from contrasting spots (lighter above and darker below). Fins are unspotted and caudal peduncle lack of spines.

== Biology ==
These solitary fishes are active during the night: During the day they usually can be found under ledges. Juveniles are pelagic. Cyclichthys spilostylus feeds on hard-shelled invertebrates; molluscs, crustaceans and sea urchins.

== Hazards ==
May be hazardous to humans in three ways:

- This fish has been associated with ciguatera poisoning.
- Like pufferfishes and boxfishes it concentrates tetrodotoxin within its body.
- The jaws are extremely strong and are capable of inflicting a severe bite.

== Gallery ==
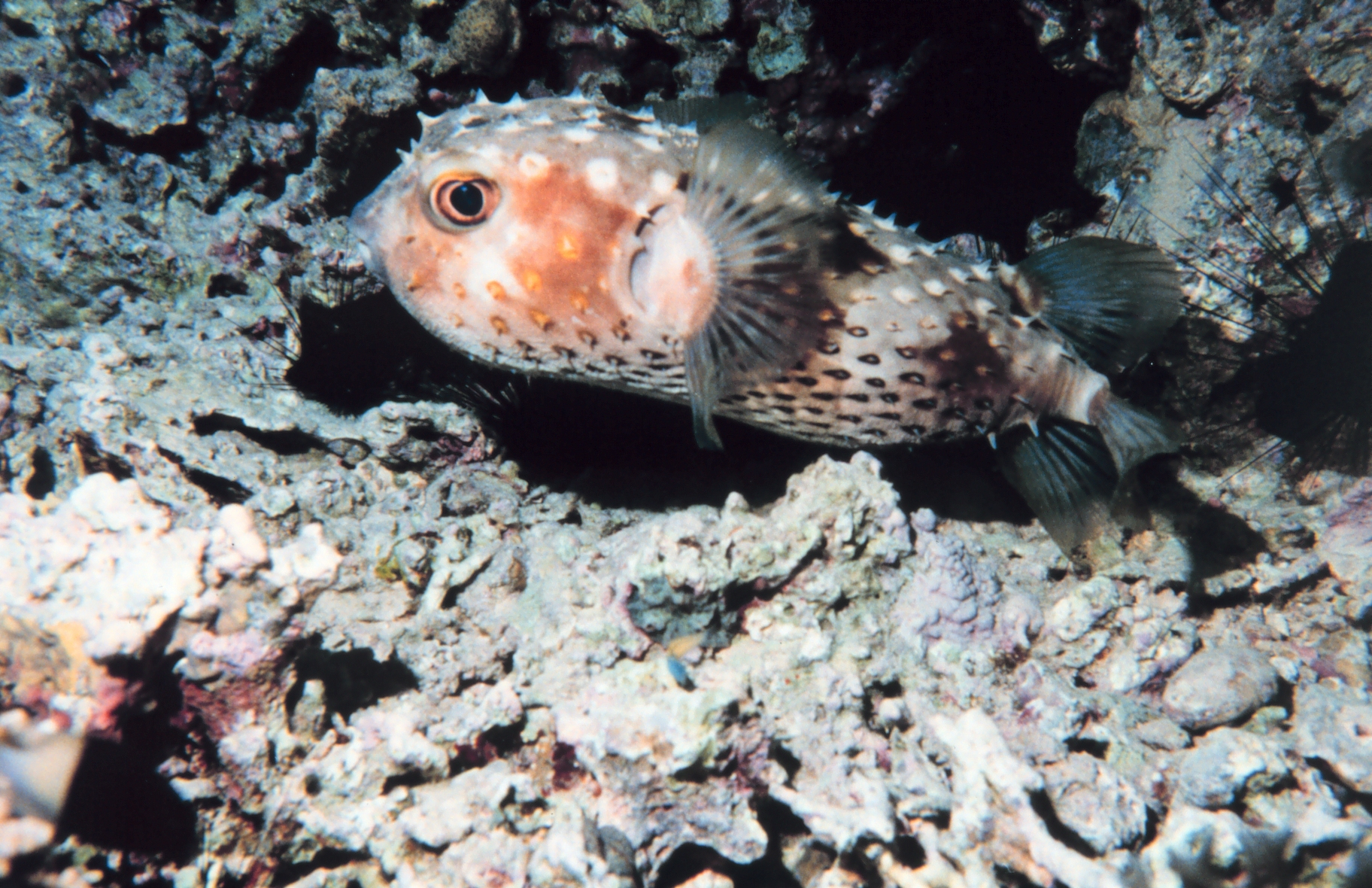
In the Red Sea

In the Red Sea

In the Red Sea

== Bibliography ==
- Eschmeyer, William N., ed. 1998. Catalog of Fishes. Special Publication of the Center for Biodiversity Research and Information, n. 1, vol. 1-3. California Academy of Sciences. San Francisco, California. ISBN 0-940228-47-5.
- Fenner, Robert M.: The Conscientious Marine Aquarist. Neptune City, USA: T.F.H. Publications, 2001.
- Helfman, G., B. Collette y D. Facey: The diversity of fishes. Blackwell Science, Malden, Massachusetts, USA, 1997.
- Moyle, P. y J. Cech.: Fishes: An Introduction to Ichthyology, 4th. ed. Upper Saddle River, USA: Prentice-Hall.
- Nelson, J.: Fishes of the World, 3rd. ed. New York: John Wiley and Sons. 1994.
- Wheeler, A.: The World Encyclopedia of Fishes, 2nd. Ed. London: Macdonald. 1985.
