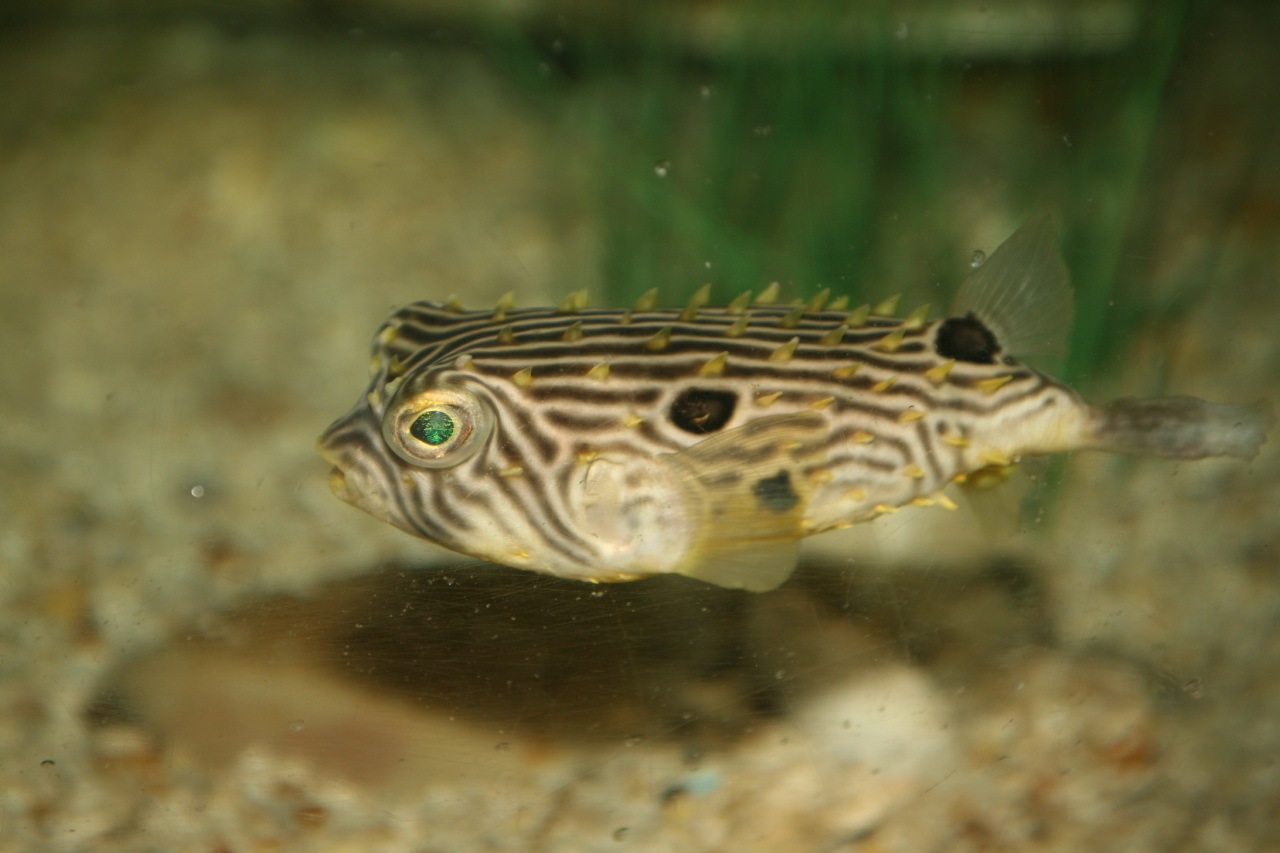
- At the National Aquarium

Conservation status
- Least Concern (IUCN 3.1)

Scientific classification
- Kingdom: Animalia
- Phylum: Chordata
- Class: Actinopterygii
- Division: Teleostei
- Order: Tetraodontiformes
- Family: Diodontidae
- Genus: Chilomycterus
- Species: C. schoepfii

Binomial name
- Chilomycterus schoepfii (Walbaum, 1792)

= Striped burrfish =

Species of fish

The striped burrfish or simply burrfish (Chilomycterus schoepfii) is a member of the porcupinefish family Diodontidae.

== Distribution ==
The burrfish is found mostly in the tropics of the western Atlantic Ocean from Brazil to Florida as well as along the Atlantic coast of North America, sometimes as far north as Cape Cod and regularly during the late summer and fall in the vicinity of New York. One has been reported caught on dead shrimp as far as Oyster Lake, near Matagorda Bay, TX. The fish has rarely been seen within the Gulf of Maine.

It spawns off New Jersey in July. Juveniles are also found in the Chesapeake Bay in the summertime.

== Description ==
At the Liberty Science Center

It is distinguished from the porcupinefish by the shorter, less sharply pointed, and immovable spines which cover the somewhat spherical body. It can inflate its body by taking either air or water into a ventral extension of the stomach. Its color is olivaceous or brownish above and pale yellow below. The back and sides are irregularly striped with brownish, dusky, or black lines which are parallel to each other and which run obliquely downward. There are several large black spots on the sides, one just below the dorsal fin, and another behind the pectoral fin. Its maximum size is about 10 inches.

== Habitat ==
The burrfish is a relatively shallow-dwelling fish. It is commonly found in areas with soft sediments such as sea grass beds and estuaries.

== Diet ==
It feeds on invertebrates such as oysters, barnacles, mussels, small crabs, and hermit crabs.

== Utilization ==
Dead C. schoepfii on a beach

It has no commercial value but is occasionally taken by fishermen and stuffed as curio. Some end up in the aquarium pet trade. It occasionally is killed in gill nets and then tossed back by the fishermen. It is often washed ashore along the beach and is a treacherous object if stepped on by mistake with bare feet.
