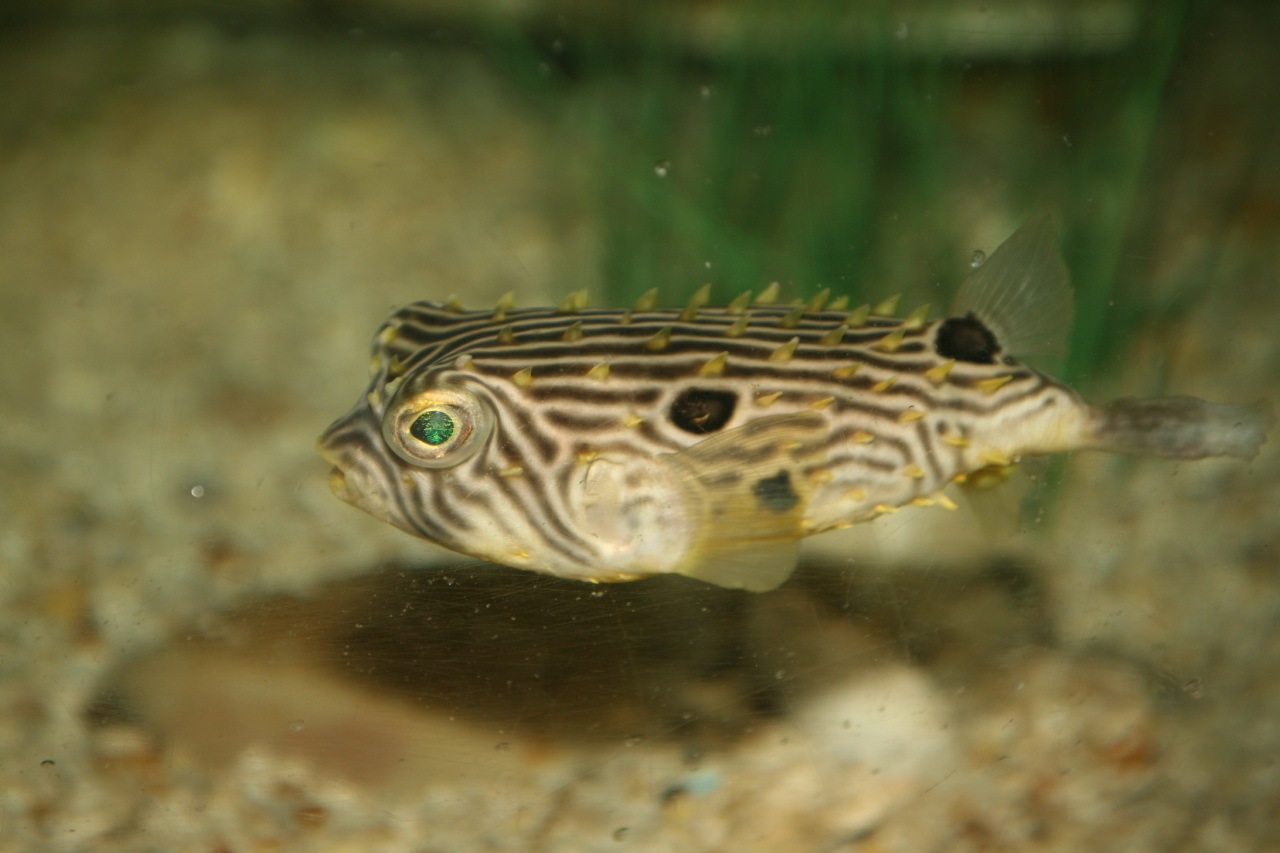
- Chilomycterus schoepfii

Scientific classification
- Kingdom: Animalia
- Phylum: Chordata
- Class: Actinopterygii
- Division: Teleostei
- Order: Tetraodontiformes
- Family: Diodontidae
- Genus: Chilomycterus; Brisout de Barneville, 1846

Type species
- Diodon atringa Brisout de Barneville, 1846

Synonyms
- List: Atinga Le Danois, 1954; Chilomyctere Bibron, 1855; Cyanichthys Kaup, 1855; Lyosphaera Evermann & Kendall, 1898 (uncertainly a synonym of this genus)

= Chilomycterus =

Burrfishes Temporal range: Early Miocene–present

Genus of fishes

Chilomycterus is a genus of diodontid tetraodontiform fishes commonly called "burrfish".

== Distribution ==
A majority of Chilomycterus species are found in the Atlantic Ocean, and primarily in the western Atlantic. Only one species, C. reticulatus, is also found in the Indo-Pacific region. The western Atlantic appears to have always been a region of diversity for the genus, as a majority of fossil species have been found there. Only a single indeterminate fossil assigned to this genus is known from the Pacific coast of Panama.

== Species ==
There are currently six recognized species in this genus:

Species	Common name	Image
Chilomycterus antennatus (G. Cuvier, 1816)	bridled burrfish	
Chilomycterus antillarum D. S. Jordan & Rutter, 1897	web burrfish	
Chilomycterus mauretanicus (Y. Le Danois, 1954)	Guinean burrfish	
Chilomycterus reticulatus (Linnaeus, 1758)	spotfin burrfish	
Chilomycterus schoepfii (Walbaum, 1792)	striped burrfish	
Chilomycterus spinosus (Linnaeus, 1758)	brown burrfish	

=== Fossil species ===
The following fossil species are known:

- †Chilomycterus circumflexus (Leriche, 1942) (Middle to Late Miocene of Cuba and Florida & North Carolina, US) (=Diodon circumflexus Leriche, 1942)
- †Chilomycterus dzonotensis Cantalice et al., 2025 (Late Miocene/Early Pliocene of Mexico)
- †Chilomycterus exspectatus Aguilera et al, 2017 (Late Miocene of Panama)
- †Chilomycterus ferreirai (Santos & Travassos 1960) (Early Miocene of Brazil & Venezuela)
- †Chilomycterus gatunensis (Toula, 1909) (Late Miocene of Panama)
- †Chilomycterus kugleri (Casier, 1958) (Late Miocene of Trinidad)
- †Chilomycterus tyleri Aguilera et al, 2017 (Late Miocene of Panama)
- †Chilomycterus vetus (Leidy, 1877) (Middle Miocene of Trinidad, Late Miocene of Florida, US)

The former species C. acanthodes from the Miocene of Italy is now placed in Oligodiodon.
