= Cyclichthys orbicularis =

- In Indonesia

Scientific classification
- Kingdom: Animalia
- Phylum: Chordata
- Class: Actinopterygii
- Division: Teleostei
- Order: Tetraodontiformes
- Family: Diodontidae
- Genus: Cyclichthys
- Species: C. orbicularis

Binomial name
- Cyclichthys orbicularis (Bloch, 1785)

Species of fish

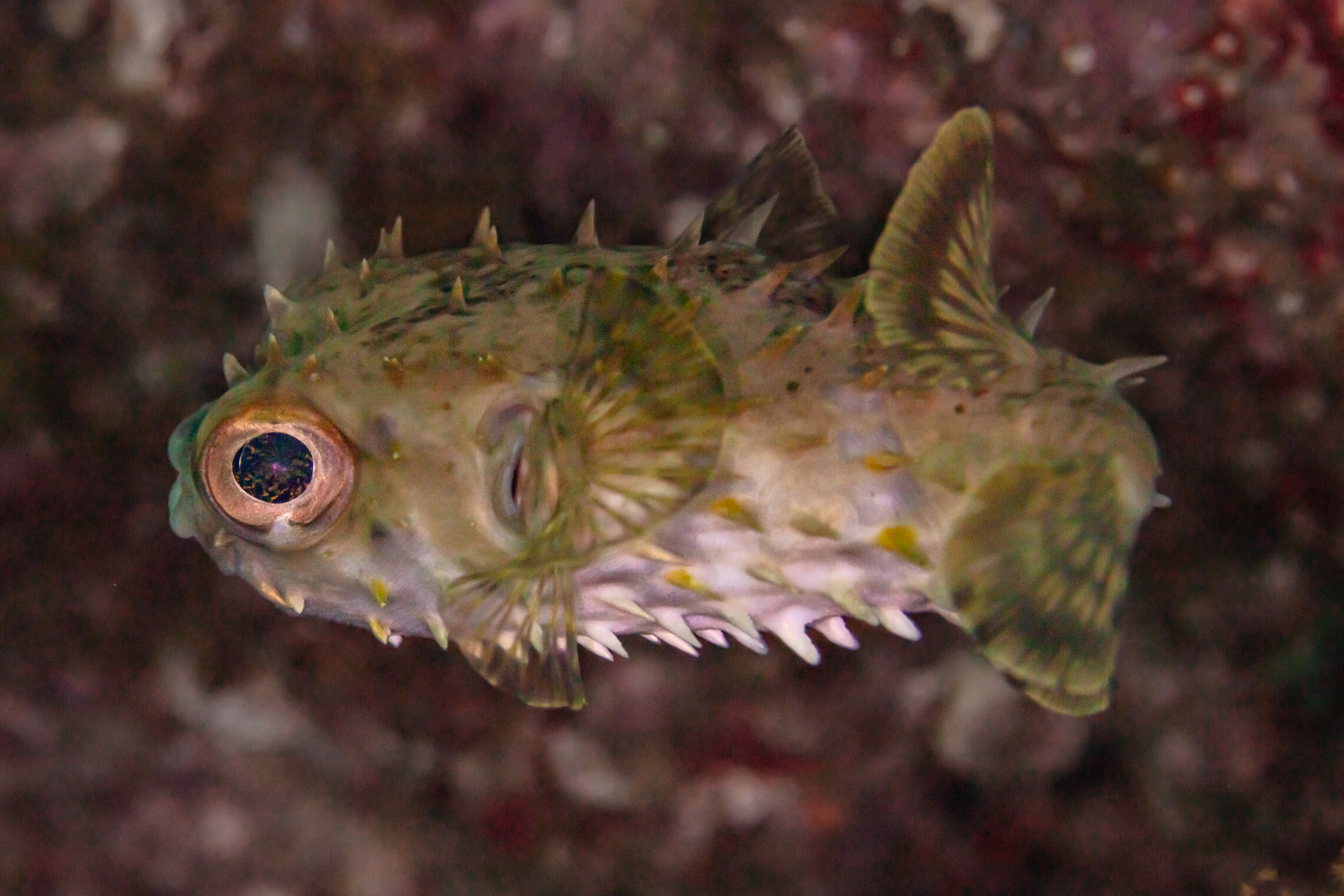
In the Gulf of Oman

Cyclichthys orbicularis, known commonly as the birdbeak burrfish among other vernacular names, is a species of marine fish in the family Diodontidae.

== Distribution and habitat ==
The Birdbeak burrfish is widespread throughout the tropical waters of the Indo-West Pacific region from Red Sea to the Philippines. It is also one of the more common visitors to the waters around Cape Town in South Africa. It is usually found on coastal shelves, occurring from the surface to a depth of around 150 m (490 ft). It most commonly occurs in areas where the sea floor is covered in a soft sediment, such as sand, but may also occur above reefs.

== Description ==
The Birdbeak burrfish is a medium size fish and can grow to be up to 30 cm (12 in) long. It has a small mouth. This round fish is covered in short spines, each of which has a triangular base. All of the spines on the top of the head have three subdermal roots. It is pale brown above and white below and has round brown spots scattered across the body, especially towards the tail. The fins are translucent.

== Ecology ==
This species is able to inflate itself by ingesting water. In this state, it is spherical and its spines are erect. It moves little when inflated. It is sometimes trawled in large numbers. A nocturnal species. Active at night and twilight.

=== Early development ===
A study published in 2015 examined the development of offspring produced by a wild-caught but captive pair of birdbeak birdfish. The two individuals lay together on the sediment the day before spawning and produced two spawns of fertilised eggs. The embryo and primordial eyes formed within a day of spawning, with the larvae hatching the next day. They were, on average, 3.5 mm (0.14 in) long. At this point, the mouth and anus were still closed and the head and trunk were covered by a vestibular dermal sac. Membranous pectoral fins were clearly visible. Melanophores and xanthophores were scattered across the body and the eyes were unpigmented. The eyes became pigmented and the mouth opened within 19 hours of hatching.

Two days after hatching the dorsal and anal fins were separated. After five days soft rays became visible in the pectoral fins and the young fish had reached a length of 3.7 mm (0.15 in). The dorsal and anal fins also had soft rays a week later. At seventeen days after hatching, 21 pectoral, 12 dorsal and 10 anal soft rays were present and the spines started to emerge. They had grown to a length of 7.6 mm (0.30 in). They become rigid by day 39 after hatching, although they continued to grow develop beyond this point. The fish were 20.8 mm (0.82 in) long at this age.

== Gallery ==
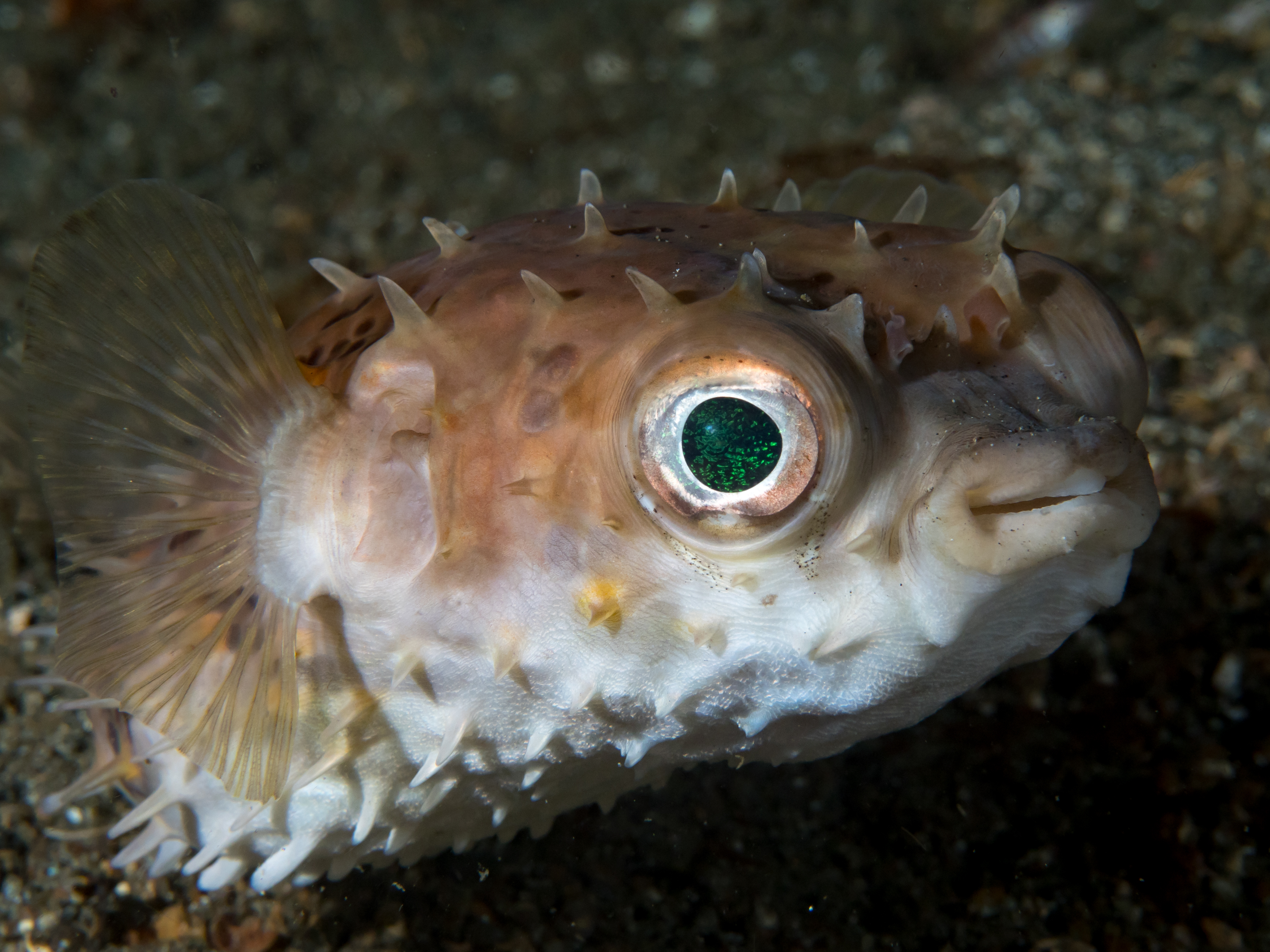
In Indonesia

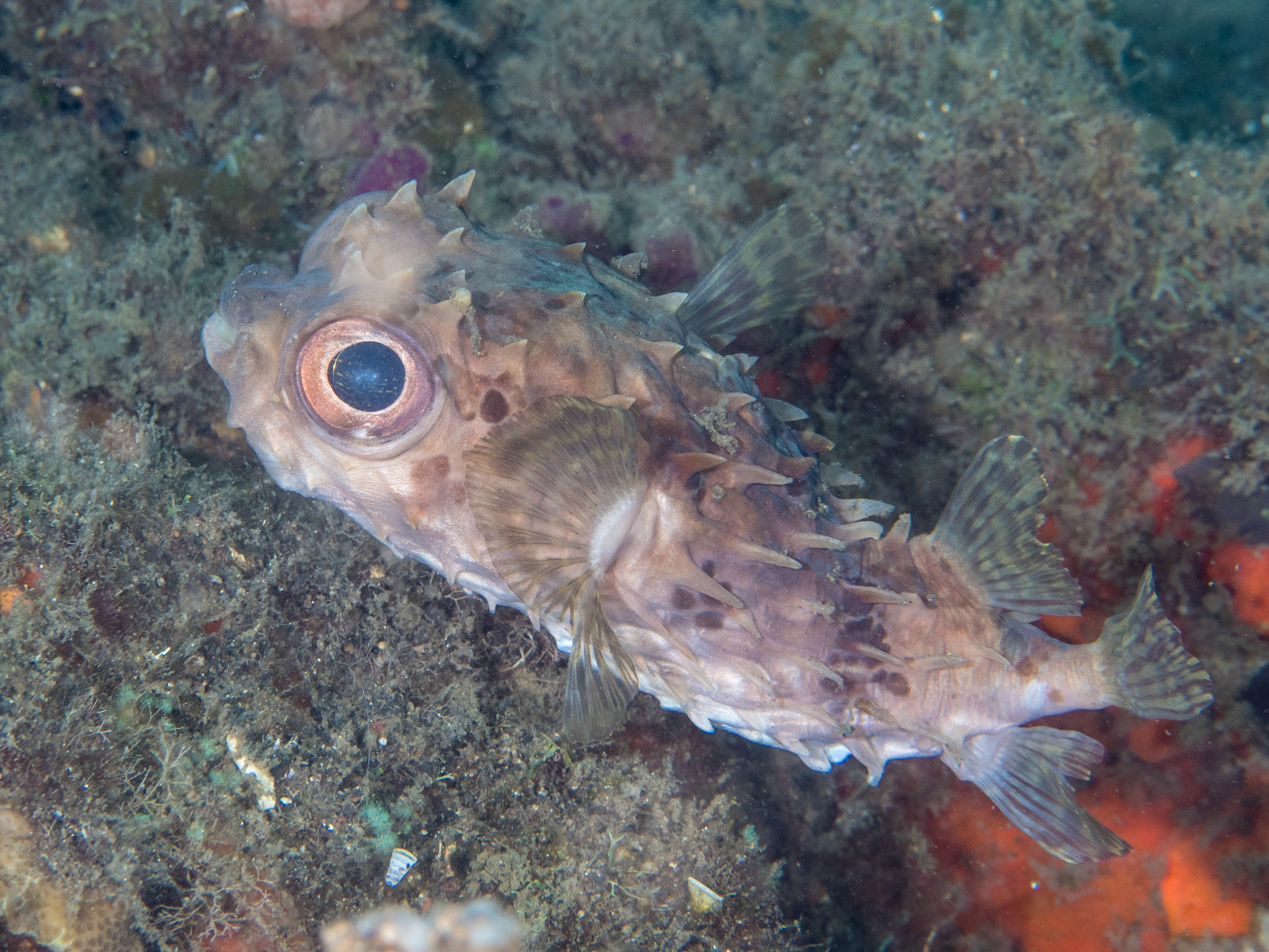
In Indonesia

In the Philippines

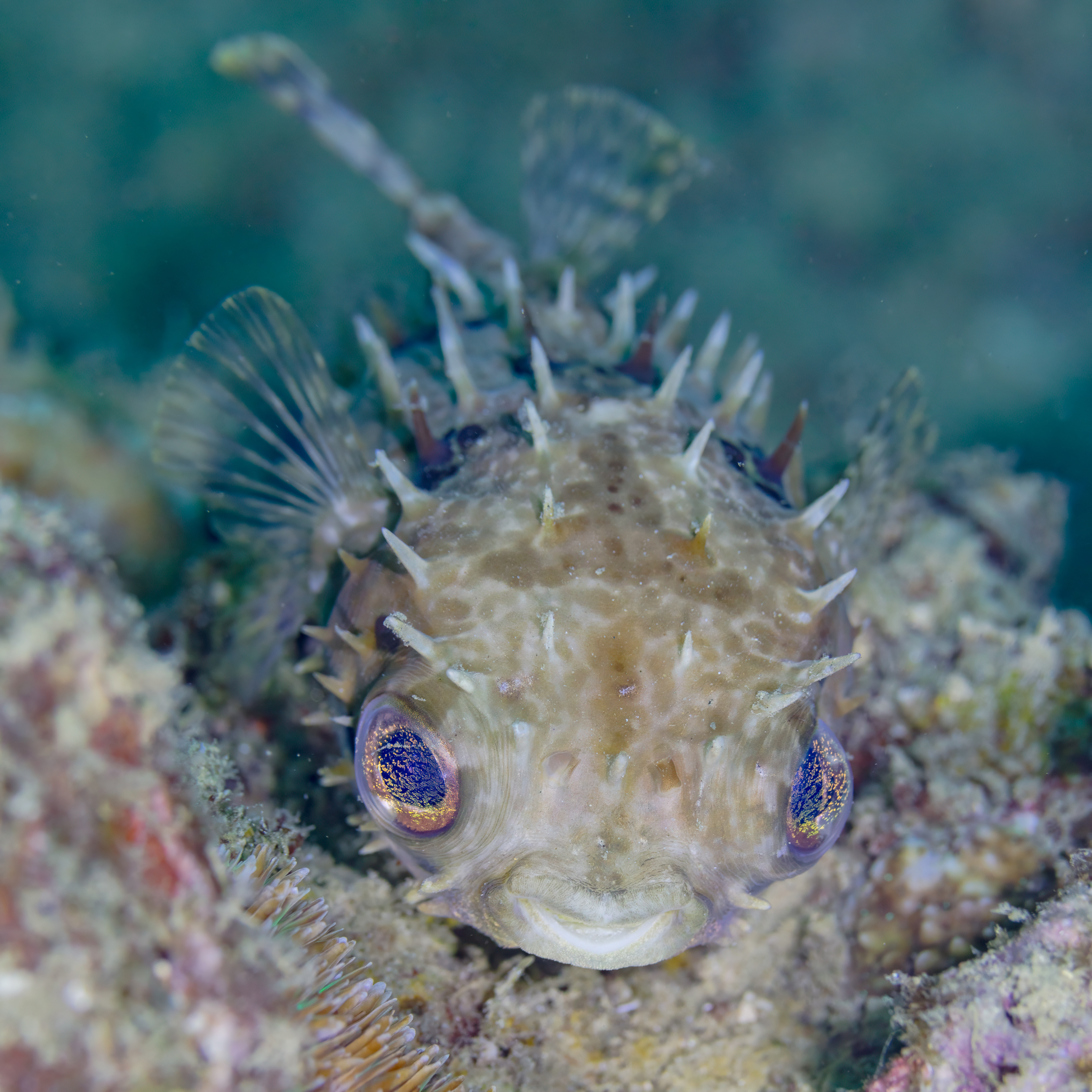
In the Philippines

At Taiwan

In captivity
