= Chilomycterus reticulatus =

- In the Canary Islands

Conservation status
- Least Concern (IUCN 3.1)

Scientific classification
- Kingdom: Animalia
- Phylum: Chordata
- Class: Actinopterygii
- Division: Teleostei
- Order: Tetraodontiformes
- Family: Diodontidae
- Genus: Chilomycterus
- Species: C. reticulatus

Binomial name
- Chilomycterus reticulatus (Linnaeus, 1758)

Synonyms
- List: Diodon reticulatus Linnaeus, 1758; Diodon atringa Linnaeus, 1758; Chilomycteris atringa (Linnaeus, 1758); Diodon tigrinus Cuvier, 1818; Chilomycterus affinis Günther, 1870; Euchilomycterus quadradicatus Waite, 1900

Species of fish

Chilomycterus reticulatus, the spotfin burrfish, spotted burrfish, Pacific burrfish, spotfin porcupinefish or few-spined porcupinefish, is a species of fish in the genus Chilomycterus, which is part of the porcupinefish family Diodontidae.

== Distribution ==
Chilomycterus reticulatus is rather patchily distributed in warm temperate seas throughout the world in the Pacific, Atlantic, including the Gulf of Mexico and Mediterranean Sea, and Indian Oceans. In the Atlantic it reaches as far north as North Carolina in the west and Portugal in the east and south to South Africa and Brazil, in the Indo-Pacific it extends north to Japan and south to northern New Zealand and in the eastern Pacific it is found from Chile north to California.

== Description ==
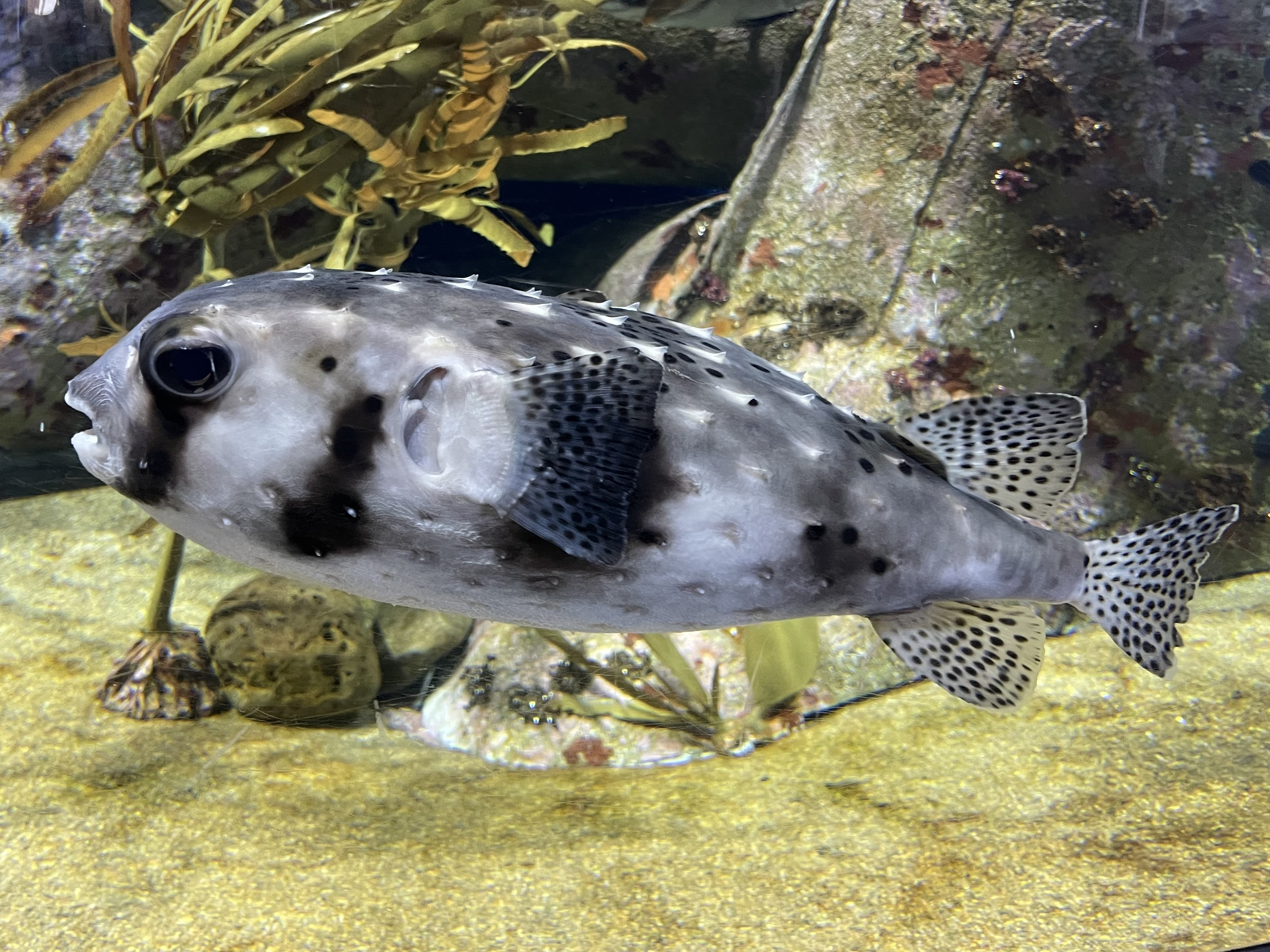
In captivity

Chilomycterus reticulatus has a rotund body, which can be inflated, with a wide, blunt head and large eyes. The nasal organ of adults sits in an open, pitted cup which in juveniles is a tentacle with two openings. The teeth are fused into a parrot like beak with no frontal groove and the mouth is large. The fins lack spines and there are no pelvic fins, the dorsal fin has 12 to 14 rays, the anal fin has 11 to 14 rays, the caudal fin has 10 rays, and there are 19 to 22 rays in the large pectoral fins. The body is covered in small spines which are triangular on cross section, some of which are reduced to plates under the skin. There is a row of 8 to 10 spines which runs from the head to the dorsal fin, and there are one or two spines on the caudal peduncle.

Adult C. reticulatus are grey to brown in colour with a black gular band and small black spots on upper surfaces and fins. The pelagic juveniles are blue in colour with dark spots above, the spots reaching to the belly. They grow to a standard length of 50 cm but up to 75 cm has been recorded

== Biology ==
In the Galápagos

Chilomycterus reticulatus is found among coral and rocky reefs at depths down to 140m, but has also been caught in trawls over softer substrates. It is normally found at depths of less than 25m and it feeds mainly on hard shelled invertebrates, including molluscs, echinoderms and crustaceans. They eggs and larvae are pelagic, juveniles are often found among floating weed mats and become demersal at around 20 cm. The adults are active by day and at night they sleep braced against the substrate. They are frequently encountered washed up on beaches.
