= Chilomycterus spinosus =

- At Brazil

Conservation status
- Least Concern (IUCN 3.1)

Scientific classification
- Kingdom: Animalia
- Phylum: Chordata
- Class: Actinopterygii
- Division: Teleostei
- Order: Tetraodontiformes
- Family: Diodontidae
- Genus: Chilomycterus
- Species: C. spinosus

Binomial name
- Chilomycterus spinosus (Linnaeus, 1758)

Synonyms
- Diodon spinosus; Cyclichthys spinosus; Chilomycterus spinosus spinosus

Species of fish

Chilomycterus spinosus, sometimes known as the brown burrfish, is a species of burrfish in the family Diodontidae. It is native to the southwestern Atlantic Ocean.

== Taxonomy ==
Although Chilomycterus mauretanicus, native to the eastern Atlantic, has historically been classified as a subspecies of C. spinosus, it is now considered by multiple sources to constitute a distinct and valid species.

== Biology ==
It is native to the southwestern Atlantic Ocean, where it ranges from Venezuela to Argentina, including the island of Trinidad. It is known to occur in both marine and brackish environments, where it is typically found at a depth of 70 to 190 m (230 to 623 ft). The species reaches 28 cm (11 inches) in total length and can weigh up to at least 12.21 grams.

== Gallery ==
At Brazil

At Brazil

At Brazil

At Brazil

At Brazil

In captivity
