= Long-spine porcupinefish =

- In the Caribbean Sea

Conservation status
- Least Concern (IUCN 3.1)

Scientific classification
- Kingdom: Animalia
- Phylum: Chordata
- Class: Actinopterygii
- Division: Teleostei
- Order: Tetraodontiformes
- Family: Diodontidae
- Genus: Diodon
- Species: D. holocanthus

Binomial name
- Diodon holocanthus Linnaeus, 1758
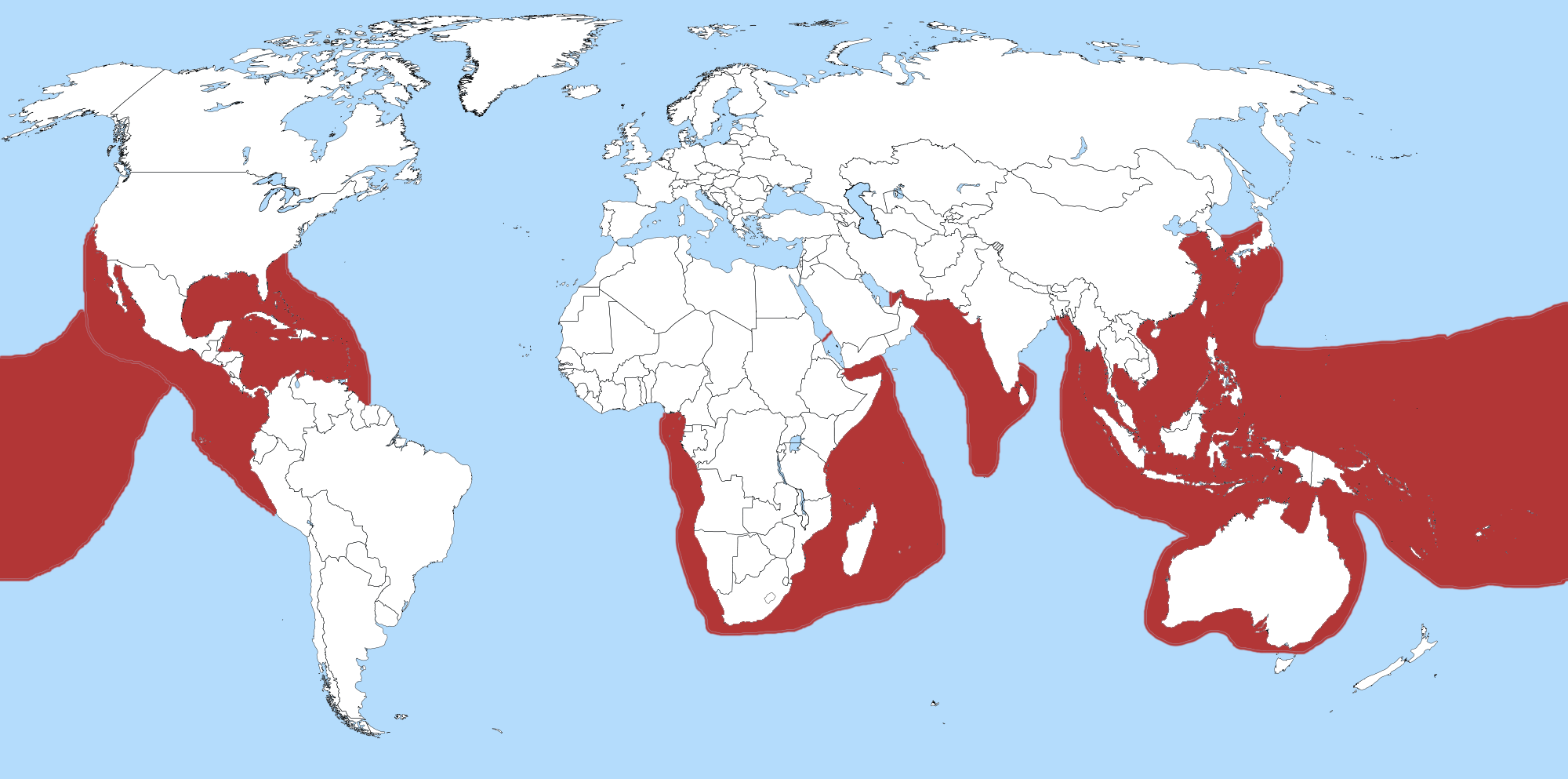
- Distribution of the long-spine porcupinefish

Species of fish

The long-spine porcupinefish (Diodon holocanthus), also known as the balloonfish, freckled porcupinefish, porcupine puffer, and porcupine pufferfish, is a species of marine fish in the family Diodontidae.

== Distribution ==
The long-spine porcupinefish has a circumtropical distribution, being found in the tropical zones of major seas and oceans:

- In the Atlantic it is found from Florida and the Bahamas to Brazil and in the Eastern Atlantic from 30°N to 23°S, as well as around South Africa.
- And In the western Indian Ocean from the southern Red Sea to Madagascar, Réunion and Mauritius.
- Also In the Pacific Ocean from southern Japan to Lord Howe Island, and east to the Hawaiian and Easter islands. Also from southern California to Colombia and the Galapagos Islands.

== Description ==
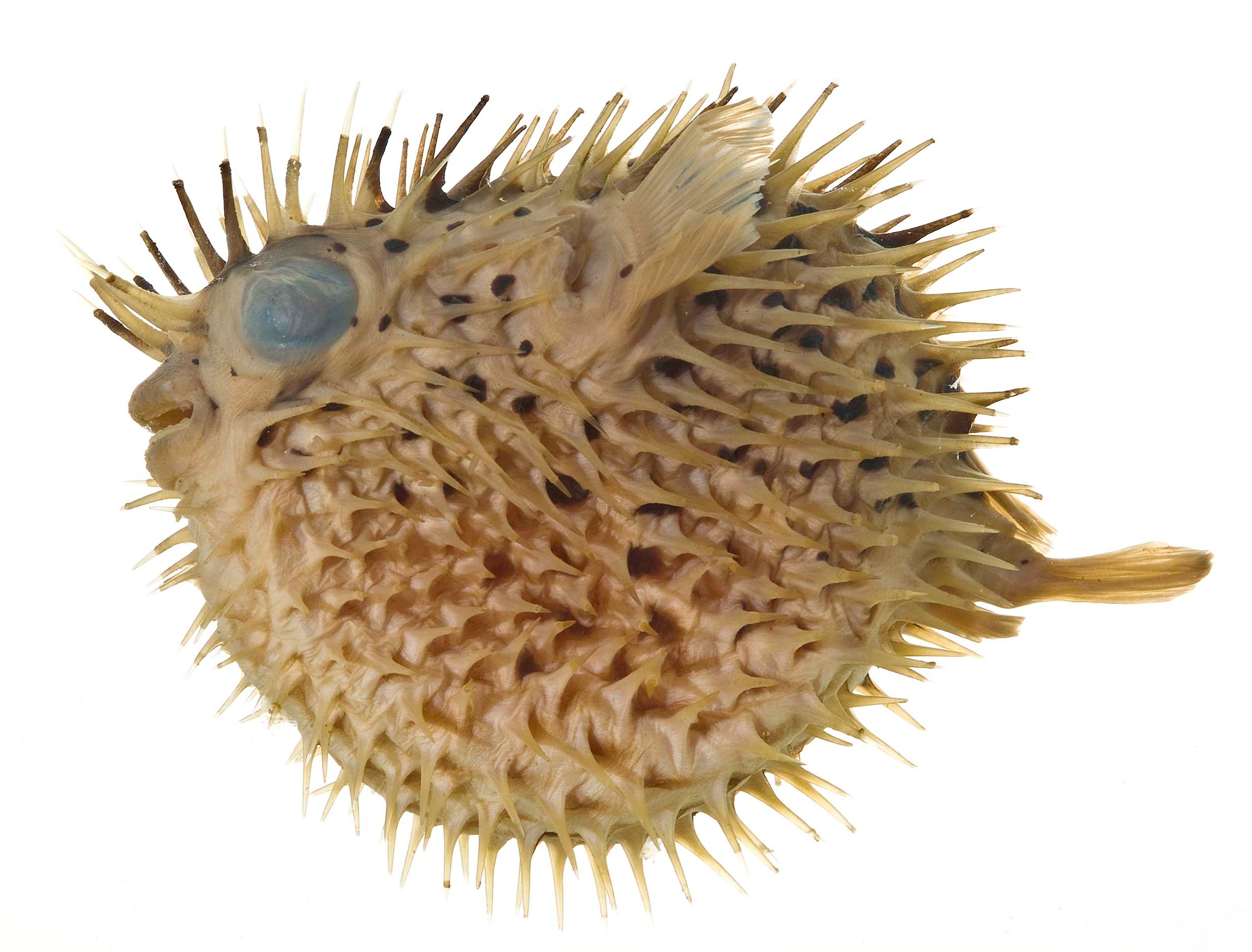
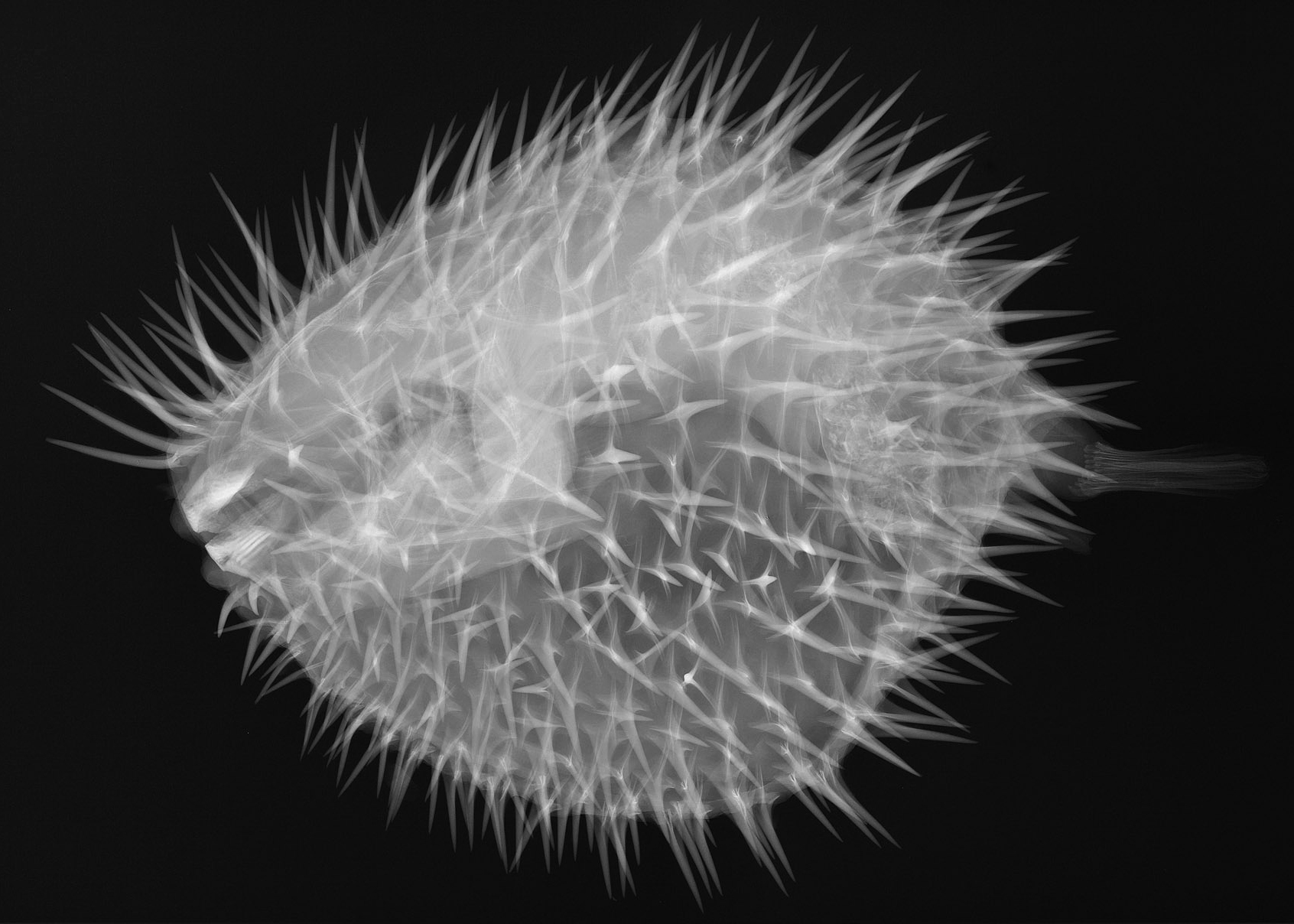
Conventional and X-ray images of D. holocanthus

The long-spine porcupinefish is pale in color with large black blotches and smaller black spots; these spots becoming fewer in number with age. It has many long, two-rooted depressible spines particularly on its head. The teeth of the two jaws are fused into a parrot-like "beak". Adults may reach 50 cm (20 in) in length.

The only other fish with which it might be confused is the black-blotched porcupinefish (D. liturosus), but it has much longer spines than that species.

== Habitat ==
They are found over the muddy sea bottom, in estuaries, in lagoons or on coral and rocky reefs around the world in tropical and subtropical seas.

== Biology ==
Spawns at the surface at dawn or at dusk in pairs or in groups of males with a single female; the juveniles remain pelagic until they are at least 7 cm (3 in) long. Young and sub-adult fish sometimes occur in groups.

=== Diet ===
The long-spine porcupine fish is an omnivore that feeds on mollusks, sea urchins, hermit crabs, snails, and crabs during its active phase at night. They use their beak combined with plates on the roof of their mouths to crush their prey such as mollusks and sea urchins that would otherwise be indigestible.

== Gallery ==
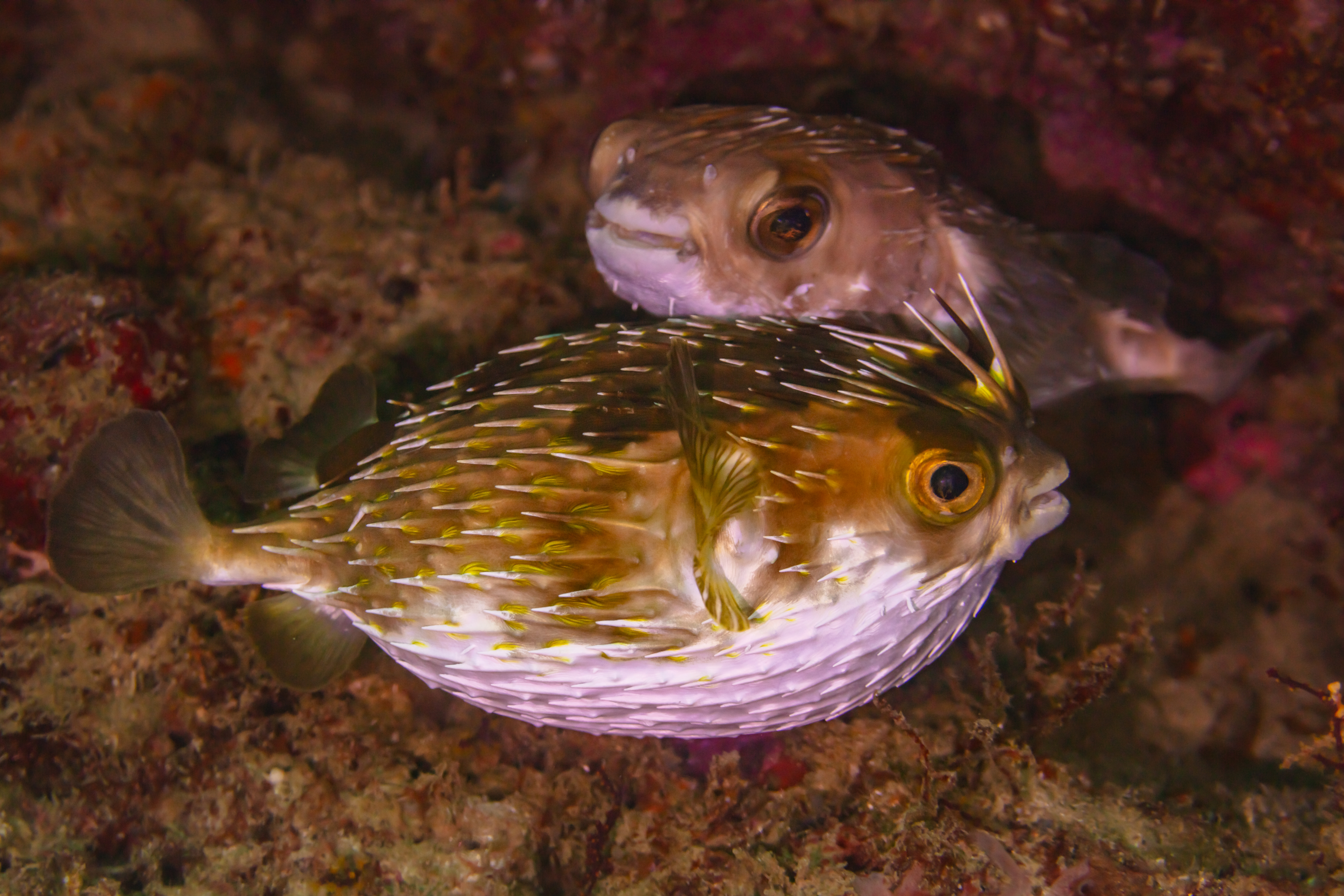
In the Gulf of Oman

Schooling, in Taiwan

In captivity
