= Chilomycterus mauretanicus =

- At Cabo Verde

Scientific classification
- Kingdom: Animalia
- Phylum: Chordata
- Class: Actinopterygii
- Division: Teleostei
- Order: Tetraodontiformes
- Family: Diodontidae
- Genus: Chilomycterus
- Species: C. mauretanicus

Binomial name
- Chilomycterus mauretanicus (Le Danois, 1954)

Synonyms
- Atinga atinga mauretanicus; Chilomycterus spinosus mauretanicus

Species of fish

Chilomycterus mauretanicus, commonly known as the Guinean burrfish, is a species of burrfish in the family Diodontidae, native to the eastern Atlantic Ocean.

== Taxonomy ==
Although Chilomycterus mauretanicus has historically been classified as a subspecies of the closely related Chilomycterus spinosus, it is now considered by multiple sources to constitute a distinct and valid species.

== Biology ==
Dorsal view, at São Tomé

It is native to the eastern Atlantic Ocean, where it ranges from the Canary Islands to Angola, as well as possibly Namibia. It is typically seen in environments at depths of less than 100 m (328 ft) with a substrate composed primarily of sand or mud. The species reaches 25 cm (9.8 inches) in total length and is known to feed on hard-shelled invertebrates such as mollusks. Although the toxicity of the species has not been confirmed, it is believed to be poisonous to humans. As such, it is not a target for commercial fisheries, and sale of the species is reportedly banned in some countries.
