= Cyclichthys hardenbergi =

Scientific classification
- Kingdom: Animalia
- Phylum: Chordata
- Class: Actinopterygii
- Order: Tetraodontiformes
- Family: Diodontidae
- Genus: Cyclichthys
- Species: C. hardenbergi

Binomial name
- Cyclichthys hardenbergi (de Beaufort, 1939)

Synonyms
- Chilomycterus hardenbergi

Species of fish

Cyclichthys hardenbergi, commonly known as Hardenburg's burrfish, is a species of porcupinefish in the family Diodontidae. It is native to the tropical western Pacific Ocean, where it is known from southern New Guinea and northern Australia east of Cape York. The species is typically seen at depths of less than 100 m (328 ft) over soft substrates. It is believed to be a solitary species that feeds on hard-shelled invertebrates. The species reaches 25 cm (9.8 inches) in standard length. Although sometimes caught by trawling, it is not a target for commercial fisheries.
