= Eodiodon =

Eodiodon Temporal range: Early to Middle Eocene

Scientific classification
- Kingdom: Animalia
- Phylum: Chordata
- Class: Actinopterygii
- Division: Teleostei
- Order: Tetraodontiformes
- Family: Diodontidae
- Genus: †Eodiodon; Casier, 1952
- Species: †E. bauzai

Binomial name
- †Eodiodon bauzai Casier, 1952

Extinct genus of fishes

Eodiodon ("dawn Diodon") is an extinct genus of porcupinefish that lived during the Eocene. It contains a single species, E. bauzai from the Early to Middle Eocene of western Europe and eastern North America, known from fossilized tooth plates. Its status as a distinct genus has been disputed, as it has been suggested that the unique features of its tooth plates may simply originate from dental wear, but more recent studies have affirmed their morphological distinctiveness. It has also been suggested to belong to its own family, Eodiodontidae, but more recent studies have retained it in the Diodontidae.

The species was first identified from the Bartonian-aged sediments of Belgium. Other specimens were later identified in middle Eocene-aged sediments from England. In 2021, the oldest remains of the genus were identified from the early Eocene-aged Nanjemoy Formation of Maryland, US.

== See also ==
- Prehistoric fish
- List of prehistoric bony fish
