= South Atlantic Bight =

Indentation in coast of southeastern U.S.

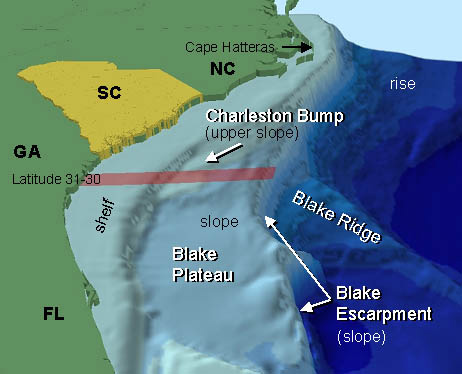
Map showing bathymetry in the South Atlantic Bight

The South Atlantic Bight is a bight in the United States coastline extending from Cape Hatteras, North Carolina to the Upper Florida Keys. The Bight forms the western boundary of the Sargasso Sea and the Gulf Stream ocean current forms the eastern boundary of the ecosystem of the bight. Major cities along the bight include from north to south: Wilmington, Myrtle Beach, Charleston, Savannah, Jacksonville, St. Augustine, West Palm Beach, Fort Lauderdale, and Miami.

== Georgia Bight ==
Within the South Atlantic Bight, the coast from Cape Fear in North Carolina to Cape Canaveral in Florida forms a fairly smooth curve known as the Georgia Bight or Georgia Embayment. The shape of the coast influences the height of the tides. Tidal ranges are only 2 feet (0.61 m) at the extremes of the bight, Cape Fear and Miami, but reach 6 to 10 feet (1.8 to 3.0 m) along the Georgia coast in the middle of the bight. The Sea Islands stretch along the central part of the Georgia Bight shore, from the mouth of the Santee River to the mouth of the St. Johns River. The Sea Islands have a complex geological history. John Zeigler distinguishes three types: "erosion remnant islands", "marsh islands", and "beach-ridge islands".

== Bathymetry ==
The bight is fairly shallow with the continental shelf extending far offshore except off south Florida and North Carolina. The Blake Plateau forms a zone of intermediary depth before dropping to the Hatteras Abyssal Plain with the Blake Escarpment. The Escarpment is defined as the geological bathymetric eastern boundary of the bight. Within the northern plateau is the Charleston Bump which deflects the Gulf Stream northeastward from its initial northerly motion. Due to storms and unpredictable shoaling, the area off the North Carolina Outer Banks is known as the Graveyard of the Atlantic. The southern part of the bight borders the Bermuda Triangle where many aircraft and sea vessels have been lost off Florida from various causes. The seafloor of the bight contains various debris and discarded rocket components from decades of launches from Cape Canaveral. A notable spacecraft, the Liberty Bell 7 was recovered from the Blake Escarpment in 1999 after being lost. Debris from launches often washes up on shores as far as North Carolina after being dredged up by hurricanes and moved around by currents.

== Weather ==
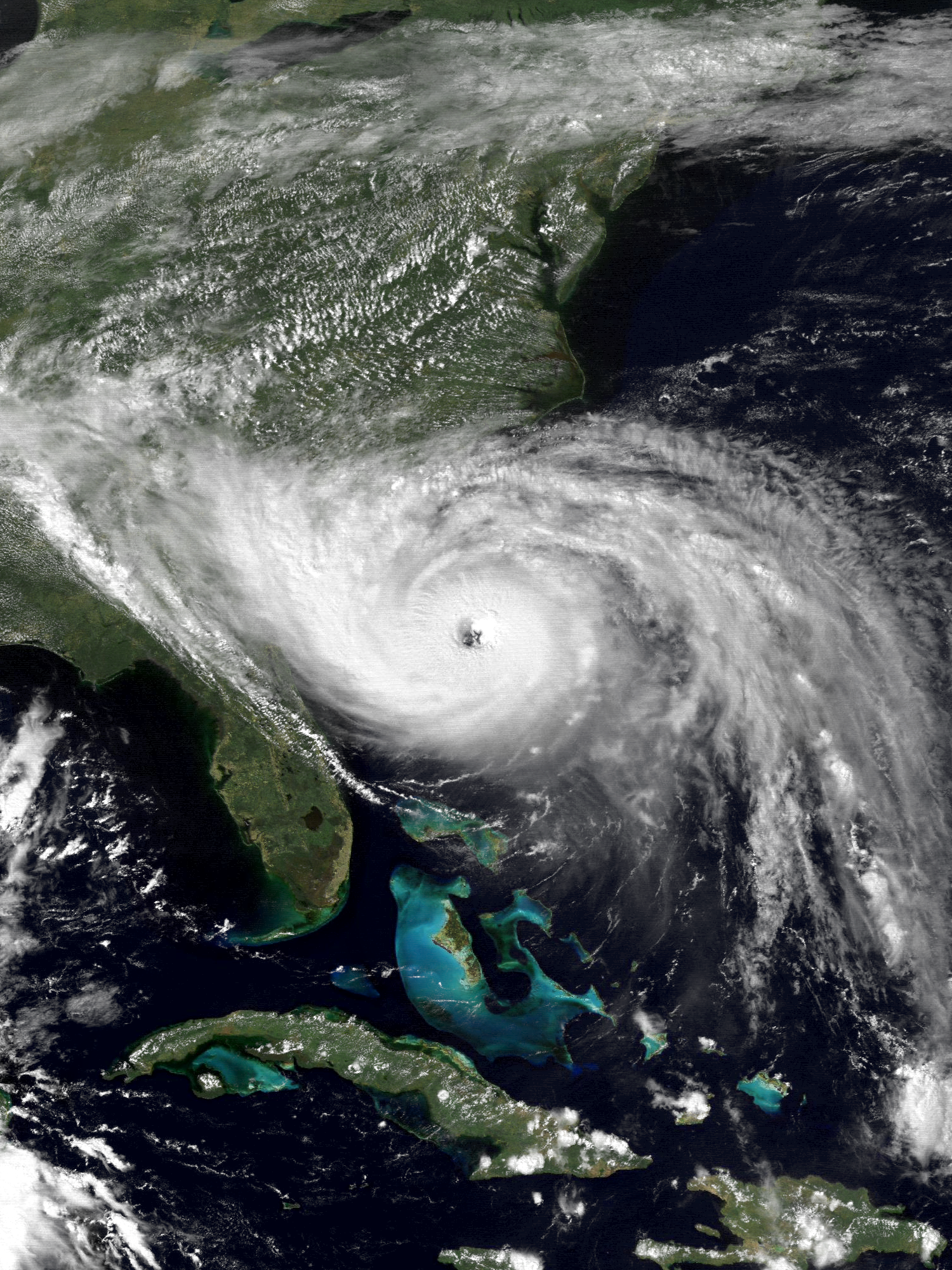
Category 4 Hurricane Hugo prior to making landfall in South Carolina in September 1989

The bight has one of the highest concentrations of lightning storms across any of the world's oceans after the adjacent Gulf of Mexico due to interactions of cold fronts with the warm Gulf Stream in the winter and storms moving offshore Florida during its summer rainy season.

Hurricanes frequently make landfall along the bight except in Northern Florida and Georgia where seasonal steering patterns usually cause storms to recurve before encountering land in these areas. The warmer waters of the Gulf Stream allows storms to intensify before making landfall. Notable storms include hurricanes Hugo, Fran, Floyd, Isabel, Matthew, Florence, and Dorian in the Carolinas as well as hurricanes King, David, Francis, and Jeanne, in Florida. In the winter, Nor'easters begin their formation in the South Atlantic Bight as northeast moving low pressure systems carrying cold air from Canada encounter the warm waters of the Gulf Stream.
