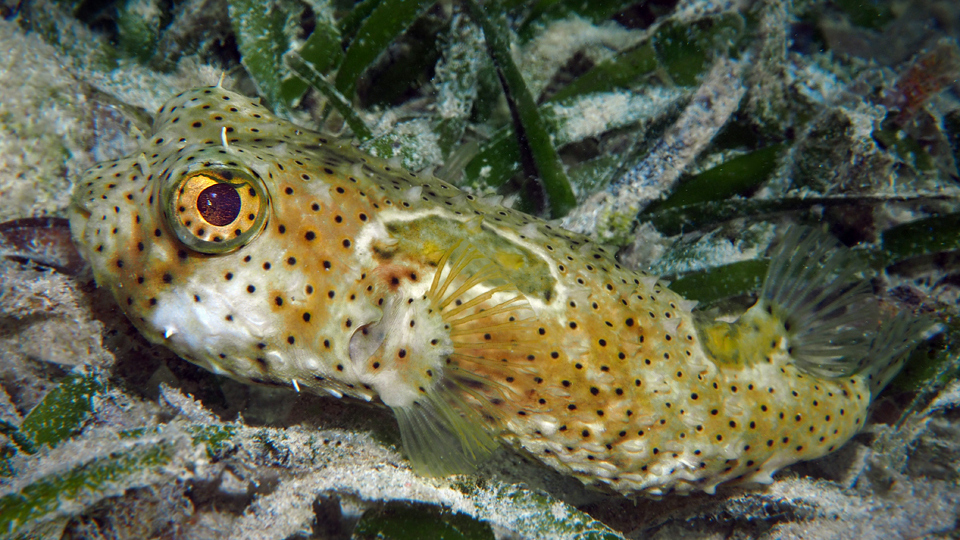

Conservation status
- Least Concern (IUCN 3.1)

Scientific classification
- Kingdom: Animalia
- Phylum: Chordata
- Class: Actinopterygii
- Division: Teleostei
- Order: Tetraodontiformes
- Family: Diodontidae
- Genus: Chilomycterus
- Species: C. antennatus

Binomial name
- Chilomycterus antennatus (G. Cuvier, 1816)

Synonyms
- Cyclichthys antennatus; Diodon antennatus

= Chilomycterus antennatus =

Species of fish

Chilomycterus antennatus, the bridled burrfish, is a species of fish belonging to the family Diodontidae. It is native to the tropical waters of the Western Atlantic from southeastern Florida and the Bahamas to northern South America. They are also found in the Eastern Atlantic off the cost of Mauritania.

== Description ==
Inflated

Chilomycterus antennatus has a maximum length of 38 cm. They have 10–12 short, fixed spines with fleshy sheaths on their head and body. These are arranged in an approximate row from the snout to the dorsal fin, with the ones on the sides and top of body being more vertically erect. They have long tentacles above the eyes and small black spots on their head and body. Like all members of the family Diodontidae, C. antennatus has the ability to inflate their body through the swallowing of water or air. This, along with the spines, protects them against most predators.

== Habitat ==
They are found on or near coral reefs and seagrass beds between 2–13 m.
