= Diodon =

Porcupinefishes Temporal range: Middle Miocene–present
- Diodon hystrix

Scientific classification
- Kingdom: Animalia
- Phylum: Chordata
- Class: Actinopterygii
- Division: Teleostei
- Order: Tetraodontiformes
- Family: Diodontidae
- Genus: Diodon; Linnaeus, 1758

Type species
- Diodon hystrix Linnaeus, 1758

Genus of fishes

Porcupinefishes or balloonfishes are any of the various species of the genus Diodon, the type genus of Diodontidae.

== Distinguishing features ==
Fish of the genus Diodon have:

- two-rooted, movable spines (which are derived from modified scales) distributed over their bodies.
- beak-like jaws, used to crush their hard-shelled prey (crustaceans and molluscs).

They differ from the swelltoads and burrfishes (genera Cyclichthys and Chilomycterus, respectively), which, in contrast, have fixed, rigid spines.

== Defense mechanisms ==
- Like true pufferfishes of the related family Tetraodontidae, porcupinefishes can inflate themselves. Once inflated, a porcupinefish's erect spines stand perpendicular to the skin, so pose a major difficulty to their predators; a fully inflated, large porcupinefish can choke a shark to death. According to Charles Darwin in The Voyage Of the Beagle (1845), Darwin was told by a Doctor Allen of Forres, UK, that the Diodon actually had been found "floating alive and distended, in the stomach of the shark" and had been known to chew its way out of shark bodies after being swallowed, causing the death of its attacker.
- They may be poisonous, through the accumulation of tetrodotoxin or ciguatera.

== Species ==
=== Extant species ===
Currently, five extant species are recognized in this genus:

Image	Scientific name	Common name	Distribution
	Diodon eydouxii Brisout de Barneville, 1846	Pelagic porcupinefish	circumtropical distribution
	Diodon holocanthus Linnaeus, 1758	Long-spined porcupinefish	tropical zones of major seas and oceans
	Diodon hystrix Linnaeus, 1758	Spot-fin porcupinefish	tropical and subtropical waters of the world, including the Mediterranean Sea
	Diodon liturosus G. Shaw, 1804	Black-blotched porcupinefish	tropical and subtropical waters of the Indo-Pacific area from eastern coasts of Africa to Japan
	Diodon nicthemerus G. Cuvier, 1818	Slender-spined porcupinefish	southern Australia, as far north as Port Jackson to Geraldton, Western Australia

=== Fossil species ===
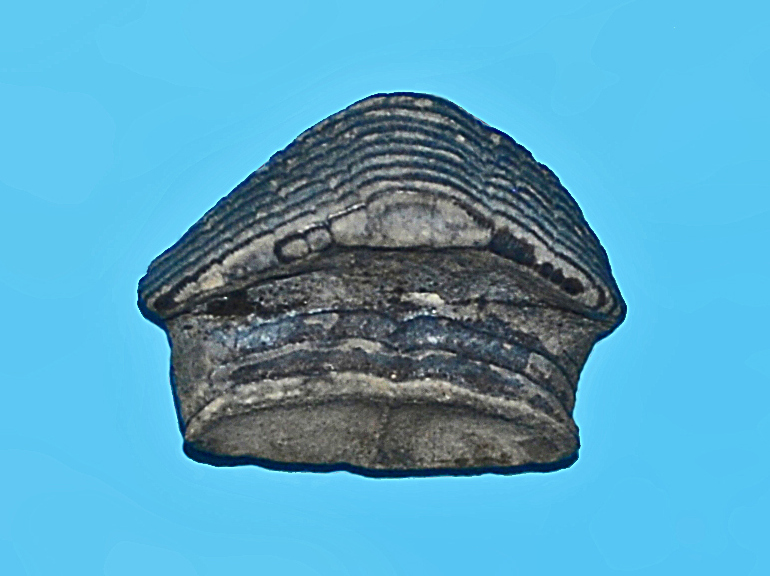
Fossil dental plate of Diodon. Miocene of United States

Fossils of Diodon are known from Tertiary-aged marine strata. These species are similar to modern species. Fossil species include:

- †Diodon scillae Agassiz, 1843 – Late Miocene of Cuba
- †Diodon serratus Aguilera et al, 2017 – Middle Miocene of Venezuela
- †Diodon sigma Martin, 1883 – Miocene of Java, Indonesia
