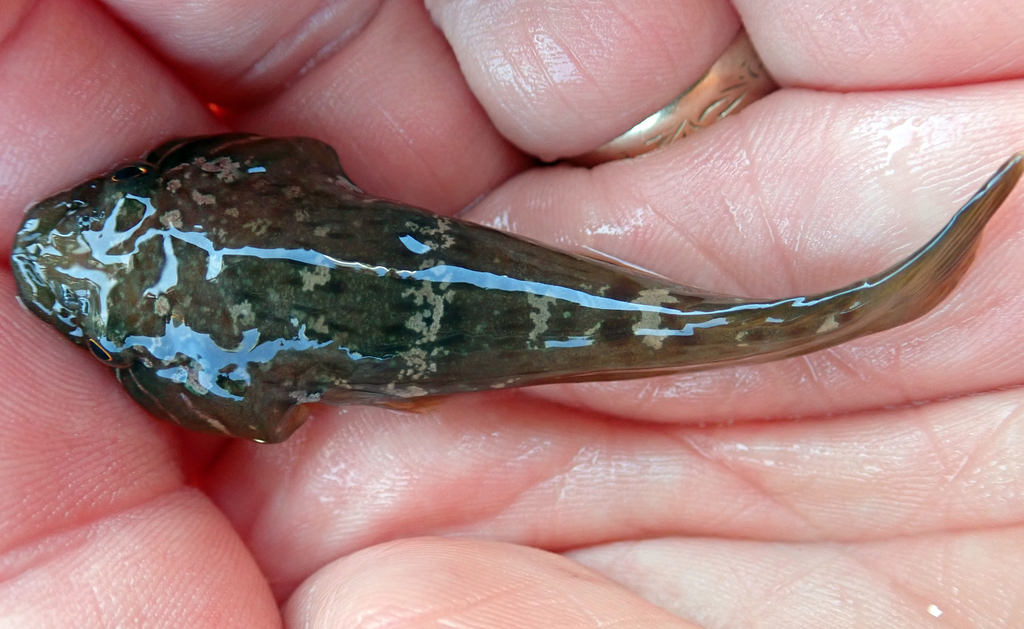

Scientific classification
- Kingdom: Animalia
- Phylum: Chordata
- Class: Actinopterygii
- Division: Teleostei
- Order: Blenniiformes
- Family: Gobiesocidae
- Genus: Trachelochismus
- Species: T. pinnulatus

Binomial name
- Trachelochismus pinnulatus (J. R. Forster, 1801)

Synonyms
- Lepadogaster pinnulatus Forster, 1801; Trachelochismus guttulatus Hutton, 1872; Crepidogaster simus Hutton, 1896; Aspasmogaster simus (Hutton, 1896); Diplocrepis tumidus Griffin, 1928

= New Zealand lumpfish =

Species of fish

The New Zealand lumpfish (Trachelochismus pinnulatus) is a clingfish of the family Gobiesocidae, found all around New Zealand including the Three Kings Islands, from low water to about 12 m, on rocky coastlines. Its length is up to 10 cm. This species was described as Lepadogaster pinnulatus by Johann Reinhold Forster in 1801 with a type locality of Queen Charlotte Sound, Marlborough Sounds off the South Island of New Zealand.
