= Deepwater burrfish =

Conservation status
- Data Deficient (IUCN 3.1)

Scientific classification
- Kingdom: Animalia
- Phylum: Chordata
- Class: Actinopterygii
- Division: Teleostei
- Order: Tetraodontiformes
- Family: Diodontidae
- Genus: Allomycterus; McCulloch, 1921
- Species: A. pilatus

Binomial name
- Allomycterus pilatus Whitley, 1931

Species of fish

The deepwater burrfish (Allomycterus pilatus) is a porcupinefish of the family Diodontidae, found off southern Australia, central and northern New Zealand, and in the Tasman Sea. It occurs at depths of 40 to 270 m (131 to 886 ft) in areas off the continental shelf. The species reaches 50 cm (19.7 inches) in total length and is reportedly easily entangled in nets due to its spines and ability to inflate its body. It is the only known member of its genus.
