= Tragulichthys =

Scientific classification
- Kingdom: Animalia
- Phylum: Chordata
- Class: Actinopterygii
- Division: Teleostei
- Order: Tetraodontiformes
- Family: Diodontidae
- Genus: Tragulichthys; Whitley, 1931
- Species: T. jaculiferus

Binomial name
- Tragulichthys jaculiferus (G. Cuvier, 1818)

Synonyms
- Diodon jaculiferus Cuvier, 1818 (Basionym); Allomycterus jaculiferus (Cuvier, 1818); Cyclichthys jaculiferus (Cuvier, 1818); Chilomycterus grandoculis Ogilby, 1910

Species of fish

Tragulichthys jaculiferus also known as the longspine burrfish, is a species of porcupinefish native to the Indo-Pacific where it occurs in reef environments at depths of from 26 to 137 metres (90 to 450 ft). This species grows to a length of 30 centimetres (12 in) TL. This species is the only known member of its genus.

In Australia
