= Lophodiodon =

- In Kenya

Scientific classification
- Kingdom: Animalia
- Phylum: Chordata
- Class: Actinopterygii
- Division: Teleostei
- Order: Tetraodontiformes
- Family: Diodontidae
- Genus: Lophodiodon; Fraser-Brunner, 1943
- Species: L. calori

Binomial name
- Lophodiodon calori (Bianconi, 1854)

Genus of fishes

Lophodiodon calori, also known as the four-bar porcupinefish, is a species of porcupinefish native to the Indo-Pacific where it is found in environments with a substrate composed of rubble and sand at depths of at most 100 metres (330 ft), often above the continental shelf. Although adults of the species are benthic in nature, juveniles are pelagic. It feeds on hard-shelled invertebrates and is noted to be an uncommon species. The species grows to a length of 30 centimetres (12 in) SL and is the only known member of its genus.

In Kenya
