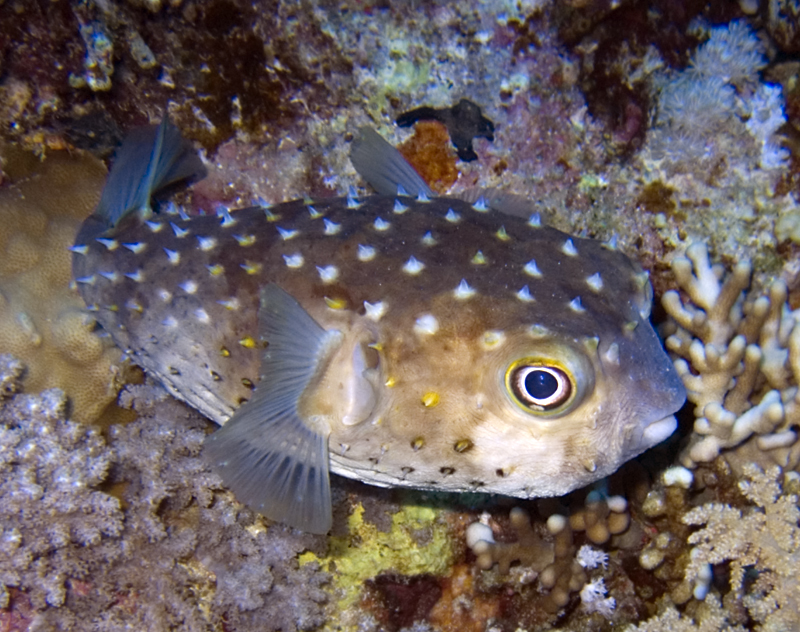
- Cyclichthys spilostylus

Scientific classification
- Kingdom: Animalia
- Phylum: Chordata
- Class: Actinopterygii
- Division: Teleostei
- Order: Tetraodontiformes
- Family: Diodontidae
- Genus: Cyclichthys; Kaup, 1855

= Cyclichthys =

Genus of fishes

Cyclicthys is a genus of fish in the porcupinefish family, Diodontidae. Species in the genus are often known as swelltoads.

== Distinguishing features ==
Fish of the genus Cyclicthys have three-rooted, rigid spines (actually modified scales) distributed over their bodies, and beak-like jaws, used to crush their hard-shelled prey (crustaceans and molluscs). They differ from members of the genus Diodon, which have moveable spines.

== Defensive mechanisms ==
Like Tetraodontidae (blowfish) they have the ability to inflate themselves. Their inflated size combined with their spines make them extremely difficult to swallow. They may be poisonous, through the accumulation of tetrodotoxin or ciguatera.

== Species ==
There are currently 3 recognized species in this genus:

Image	Scientific name	Common name	Distribution
	Cyclichthys hardenbergi (de Beaufort, 1939)	Hardenburg's burrfish	Western Pacific: southern New Guinea and tropical Australia east of Cape York
	Cyclichthys orbicularis (Bloch, 1785)	Birdbeak burrfish	Indo-West Pacific region from Red Sea to the Philippines
	Cyclichthys spilostylus (Leis & J. E. Randall, 1982)	Spotbase burrfish	Red Sea to South Africa and east to southern Japan, the Philippines, Australia and New Caledonia.
