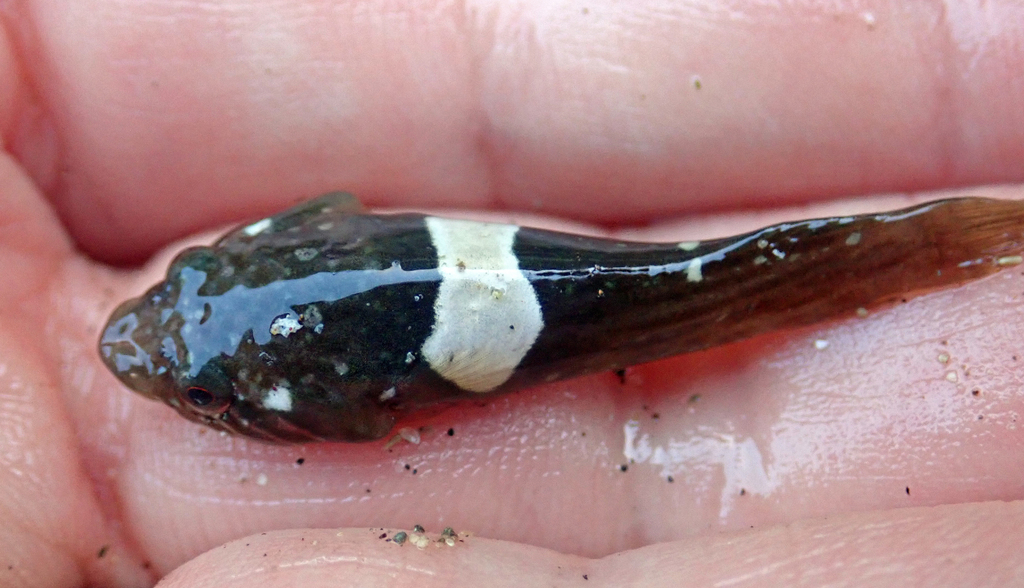

Scientific classification
- Kingdom: Animalia
- Phylum: Chordata
- Class: Actinopterygii
- Order: Blenniiformes
- Family: Gobiesocidae
- Genus: Trachelochismus
- Species: T. melobesia

Binomial name
- Trachelochismus melobesia Phillipps, 1927

= Striped clingfish =

Species of fish

The striped clingfish (Trachelochismus melobesia) is a clingfish of the family Gobiesocidae, found all around New Zealand from low water to about 5 m, on rocky coastlines. Its length is between 5 and 10 cm.
