= Charleston Bump =

Ocean bottom feature near South Carolina, US

Coordinates: 31.7°N 78.8°W

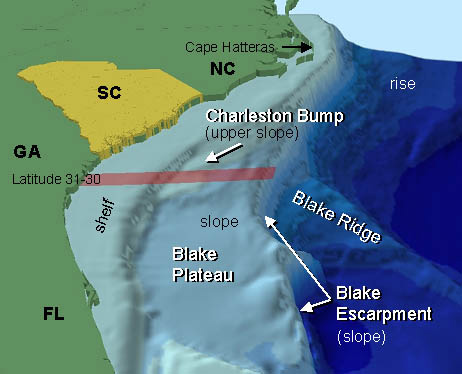
Charleston Bump (National Oceanic and Atmospheric Administration)

The Charleston Bump is a deepwater rocky ocean bottom feature approximately 90 miles (140 km) southeast of Charleston, South Carolina. The Bump, rising from the Blake Plateau, lies in the path of the Gulf Stream and deflects the Gulf Stream offshore away from the coast of the eastern United States. This deflection amplifies downstream eddies and gyres and enhances upwelling of nutrient rich waters onto the continental shelf. These nutrient inputs support an ecosystem of plankton, fish, and other sea life. Large populations of wreckfish can be found in the cave systems in this area.
