= Dicotylichthys =

- In New South Wales

Scientific classification
- Kingdom: Animalia
- Phylum: Chordata
- Class: Actinopterygii
- Division: Teleostei
- Order: Tetraodontiformes
- Family: Diodontidae
- Genus: Dicotylichthys; Kaup, 1855
- Species: D. punctulatus

Binomial name
- Dicotylichthys punctulatus Kaup, 1855

Species of fish

Dicotylichthys punctulatus, also known as the three-bar porcupinefish, is a species of porcupinefish endemic to the east coast of Australia, where it is found in coastal and offshore reef environments down to 50 m (160 ft) deep. This species grows to 40 cm (16 in) in standard length, although most only reach 18 cm (7.1 in). This species is the only known member of the genus Dicotylichthys.

== Description ==
This species grow to 43 cm (17 in) in length

== Distribution and habitat ==
They are mainly found in western Pacific ocean around Moreton Bay to Bass Strait in Australia.

== Ecology ==
Found in estuarine, coastal and offshore reefs to a depth of 50 m (160 ft). Nocturnal and solitary. Feeds on hard-shelled invertebrates.
