= Charles N. F. Brisout =

French entomologist

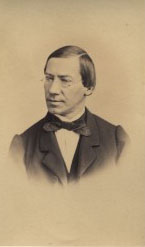
Charles N.F. Brisout

Charles Nicolas François Brisout de Barneville (22 July 1822, in Paris – 2 May 1893, in St. Germain-en-Laye) was a French entomologist who specialised in Orthoptera and Coleoptera.

He was President of the Société entomologique de France in 1873. His collections are kept by the Society.
