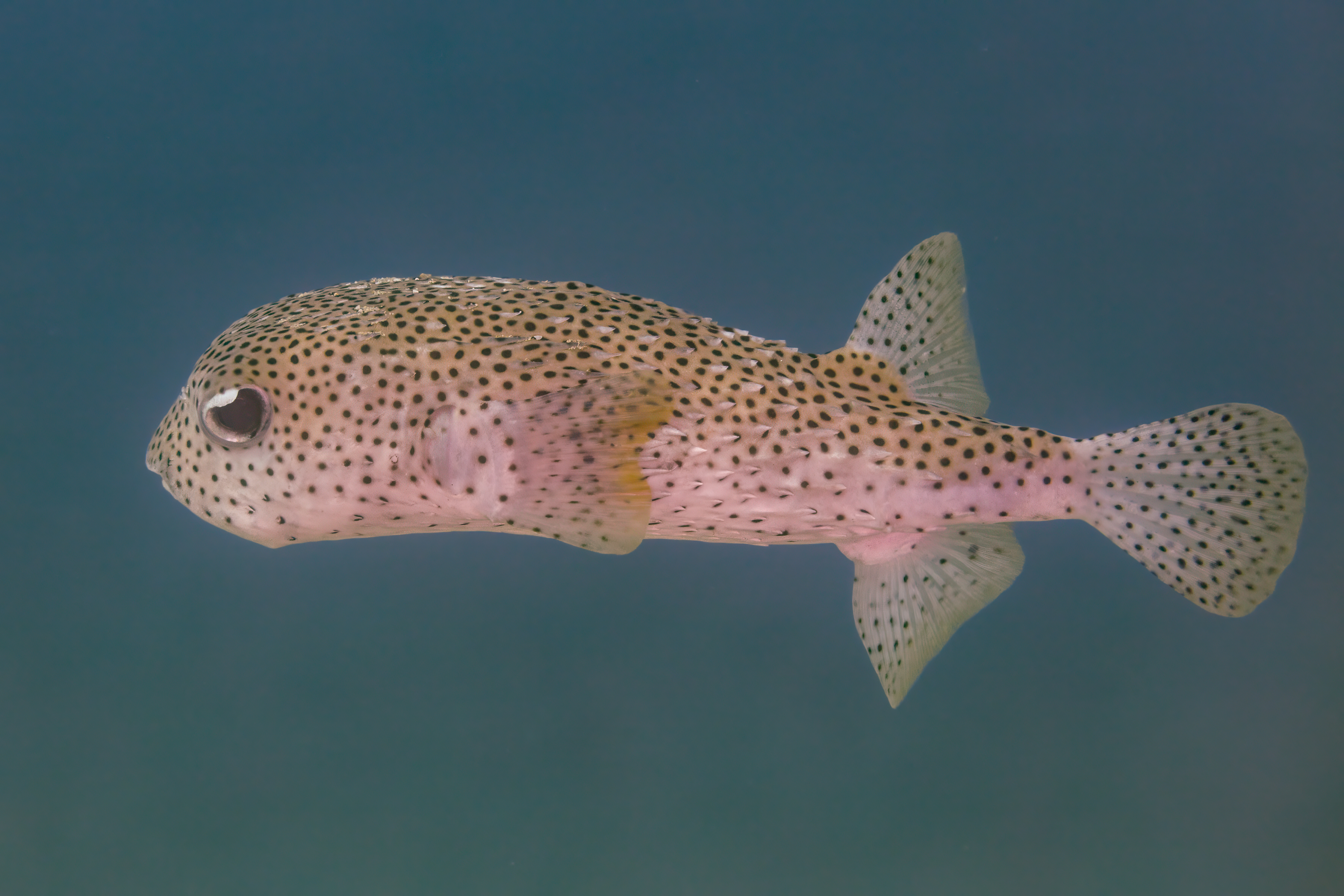
- Diodon hystrix

Scientific classification
- Kingdom: Animalia
- Phylum: Chordata
- Class: Actinopterygii
- Division: Teleostei
- Order: Tetraodontiformes
- Suborder: Tetraodontoidei
- Family: Diodontidae; Bonaparte, 1838

Genera
- Allomycterus; Chilomycterus; Cyclichthys; Diodon; Dicotylichthys; Lophodiodon; Tragulichthys

= Porcupinefish =

Porcupinefish Temporal range: Early Eocene to present

Family of fishes

Porcupinefishes are medium-to-large fish belonging to the family Diodontidae from the order Tetraodontiformes which are also commonly called blowfishes and, sometimes, balloonfishes and globefishes. The family includes about 18 species. They are sometimes collectively called pufferfishes, not to be confused with the morphologically similar and closely related Tetraodontidae, which are more commonly given this name.

They are found in shallow, temperate, and tropical seas worldwide. A few species are found much further out from shore, wherein large schools of thousands of individuals can occur.

== Taxonomy ==
=== Extant genera ===
The following genera are known:

Genus	# of species
Allomycterus McCulloch, 1921	1
Chilomycterus Brisout de Barneville, 1846	6
Cyclichthys Kaup, 1855	3
Dicotylichthys Kaup, 1855	1
Diodon Linnaeus, 1758	6
Lophodiodon Fraser-Brunner, 1943	1
Tragulichthys Whitley, 1931	1

=== Fossil genera ===
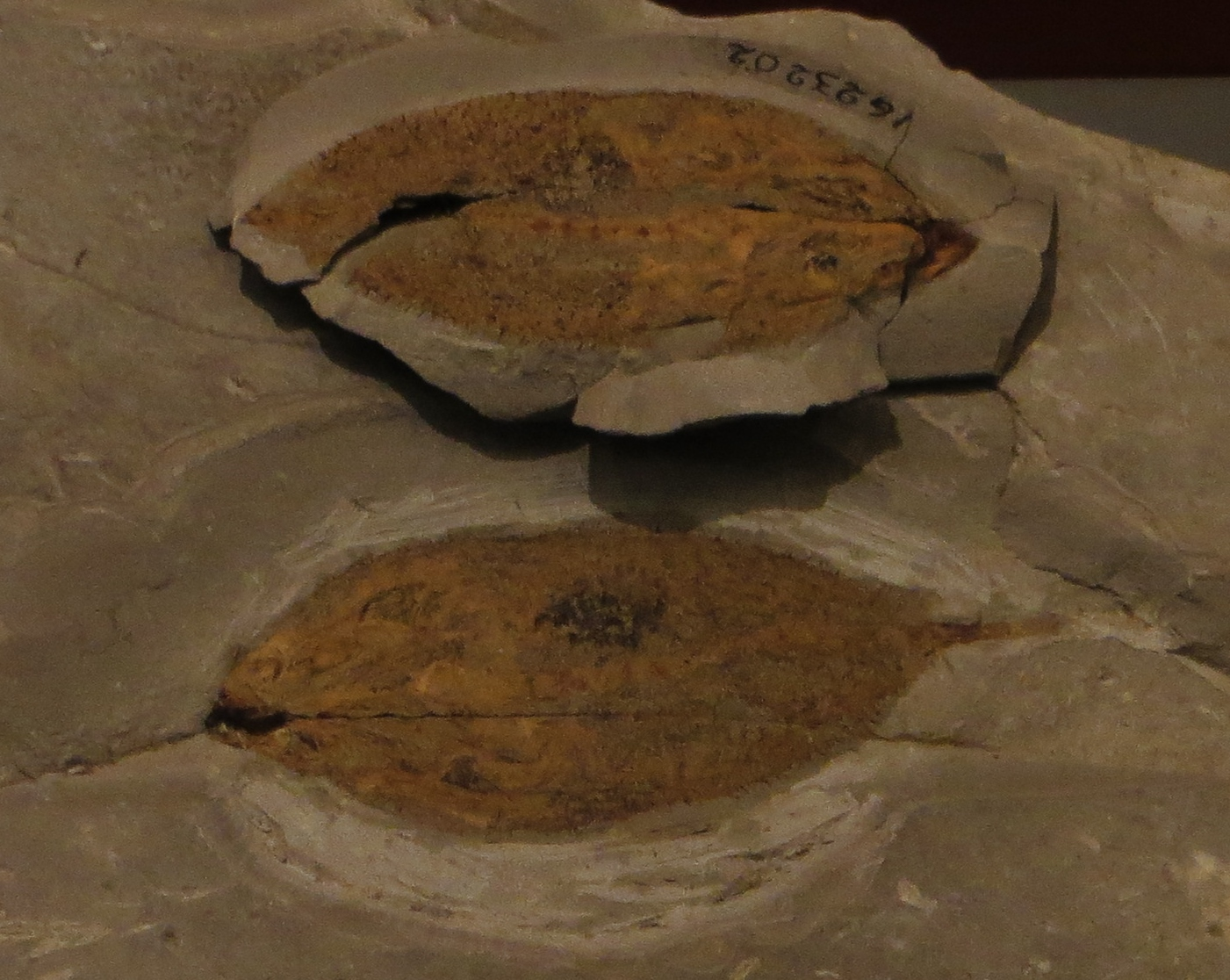
Prodiodon, an Eocene-aged fossil porcupinefish from Italy

The following genera are known only from fossil remains:

- †Eodiodon Casier, 1952 (Late Eocene of Belgium)
- †Heptadiodon Bronn, 1855 (Early Eocene of Italy)
- †Oligodiodon Sauvage, 1873 (Miocene of Austria & Italy)
- †Prodiodon Ladanois, 1955 (Early Eocene of Italy)
- †Progymnodon Dames, 1883 (mid-late Eocene of the United States and Romania)
- †Pshekhadiodon Bannikov & Tyler, 1997 (Middle Eocene of the North Caucasus, Russia)
- †Zignodon Tyler & Santini, 2002 (Early Eocene of Italy)

== Characteristics ==
Chilomycterus antennatus inflated

Porcupinefish are generally slow-moving.

They have the ability to inflate their bodies by swallowing water or air, thereby becoming rounder. This increase in size (almost double vertically) reduces the range of potential predators to those with much larger mouths. A second defense mechanism is provided by the sharp spines, which radiate outwards when the fish is inflated.

They have upper and lower teeth that fuse into a shape of a parrot's beak; they use this beak to eat molluscs and sea urchins.

Some species are poisonous, having tetrodotoxin in their internal organs, such as the ovaries and liver. This neurotoxin is at least 1,200 times more potent than cyanide. The poison is produced by several types of bacteria obtained from the fish's diet. As a result of these three defenses, porcupinefish have few predators, though adults are sometimes preyed upon by sharks and orcas. Juveniles are also preyed on by Lysiosquillina maculata, tuna, and dolphins.

== Relationship with humans ==
=== Consumption ===
Spotfin porcupinefish (Diodon hystrix), in Sabah, Malaysia

The spot-fin porcupinefish (Diodon hystrix) is consumed in many areas of the world. A study in Okinawa found that the species was negligibly toxic in its flesh, skin, intestines, gonads, and liver. Despite this, there are reports of poisoning cases from this species, ranging from mild to severe.

Porcupinefish are eaten as food fish and are an exotic delicacy in Cebu, Philippines, where they are called tagotongan. However, porcupinefish can be dangerous to consume since they can cause tetrodotoxin poisoning.

== In popular culture ==
The porcupine fish (as Diodon antennatus) is mentioned in Charles Darwin's account of his 1831–1836 trip around the world, The Voyage of the Beagle. He noted how the fish can swim quite well when inflated, though the altered buoyancy requires them to do so upside down. Darwin also mentioned:

I have heard from Dr. Allen of Forres [a fellow naturalist], that he has frequently found a Diodon, floating alive and distended, in the stomach of the shark; and that on several occasions he has known it eat its way, not only through the coats of the stomach, but through the sides of the monster, which has thus been killed. Who would ever have imagined that a little soft fish could have destroyed the great and savage shark?

== See also ==
- List of fish families
- List of marine aquarium fish species
