= Talma =

Talma may refer to:

== People ==
- Brian Talma (born 1965), Barbadian sailor and windsurfer
- César Talma (born 1980), Chilean footballer
- Elke Talma (born 1977), Seychellois swimmer
- François-Joseph Talma (1763–1826), French actor; husband of Julie
- Gábor Talmácsi (nickname "Talma"; born 1981), Hungarian motorcycle racer
- Julie Talma (1756–1805), French dancer, courtesan, and salon-holder; wife of François-Joseph
- Louise Talma (1906–1996), French-born US classical composer, academic, and pianist
- Mary Ann Ford (stage-name Talma; 1861–1944), British stage magician with "Le Roy, Talma & Bosco"; husband of Servais Le Roy [see: Talma (magician)]
- Meindert Talma (born 1968), Dutch singer and keyboardist for the band Meindert Talma & the Negroes
- Syb Talma (1864–1916), Dutch politician
- Zolya Talma (1895–1983), American actress

== Places ==
- Talma, Indiana, a US unincorporated community
- Talma Ski, a small ski resort in Finland
- Talma (village), a small village in Sipoo, Finland

== Animals ==
- Eastern Talma, a common name of the butterflyfish species Chelmonops truncatus
- Western Talma, a common name of the butterflyfish species Chelmonops curiosus
- Talma (horse), won the St. Leger Stakes in 1951

== See also ==
- Telma (disambiguation)
