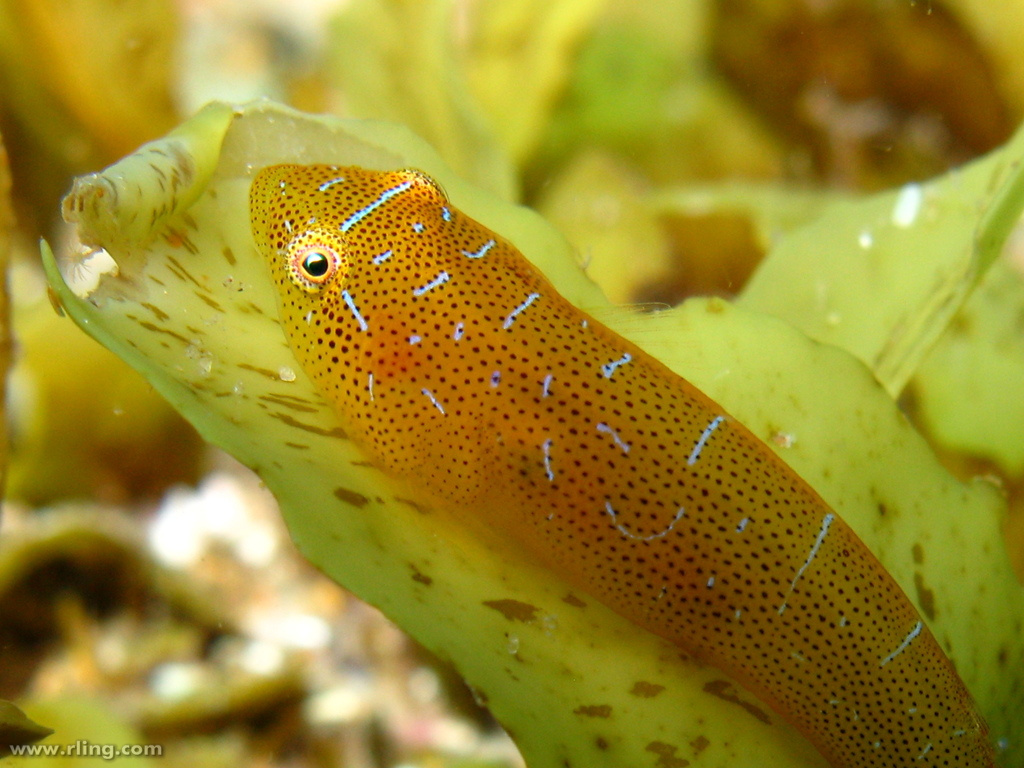

Scientific classification
- Domain: Eukaryota
- Kingdom: Animalia
- Phylum: Chordata
- Class: Actinopterygii
- Order: Blenniiformes
- Family: Gobiesocidae
- Genus: Cochleoceps
- Species: C. orientalis

Binomial name
- Cochleoceps orientalis Hutchins, 1991

= Cochleoceps orientalis =

Species of fish

Cochleoceps orientalis, common name eastern cleaner-clingfish, is a species of clingfish that is endemic to the marine waters around southeastern Australia.

== Description ==
Cochleoceps orientalis grows to approximately 55 mm long. It has no scales, instead being protected by mucus which covers the body in a thick coating. It has an intense orange to greenish-yellow colouration. The body is scattered with dark red spots that diminish in size and intensity toward the belly. Numerous, short, thin, blue, iridescent lines are present on the back and sides. These lines are generally perpendicular to the length of the body.

The posterior part of the ventral fins appear as a fleshy fringe, with the anterior part merging into the sucking disc. Parts of the disc have dermal papillae which are flat. These probably allow the fish to adhere to surfaces.

== Distribution ==
Cochleoceps orientalis lives in the marine waters of the southeastern part of Australia. It is found around New South Wales from Seal Rocks to Mallacoota, Victoria.

== Habitat and behaviour ==
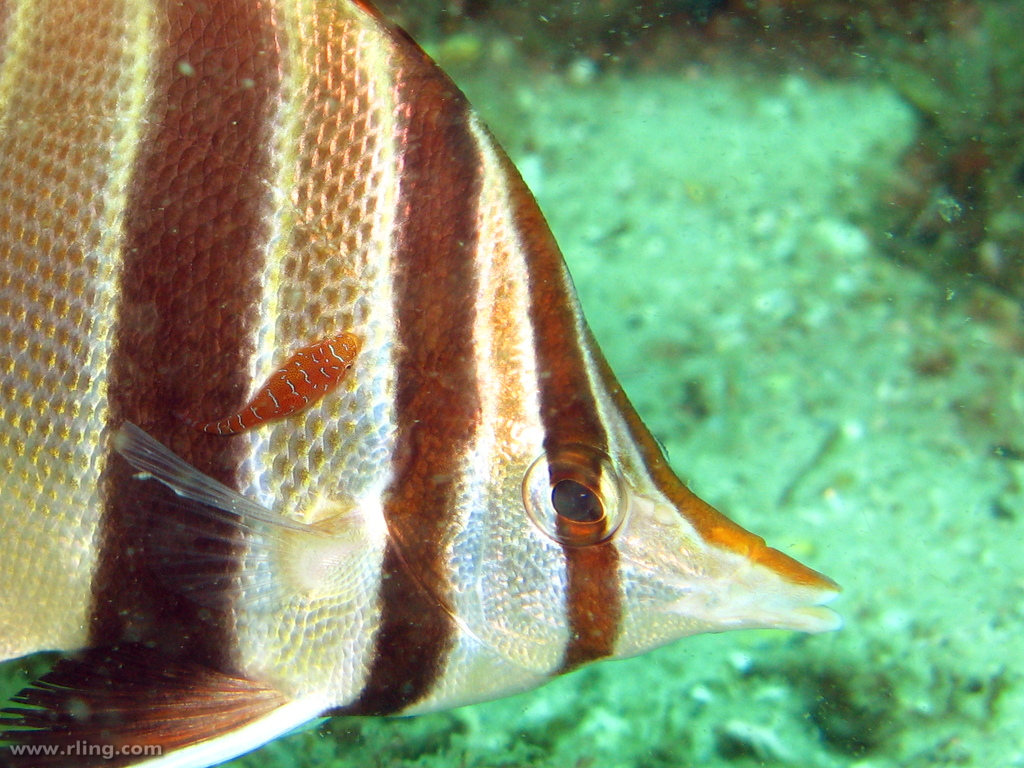
Cochleoceps orientalis cleaning the much larger Chelmonops truncatus

Cochleoceps orientalis normally lives in the demersal zone at depths of 3 to 40 metres. It is most often found on the kelp species ecklonia radiata but can sometimes occur on ascidians and sponges at greater depths.

This species avoids swimming in open waters where it would vulnerable to predators. It instead it remains sucked onto kelp, and when moving, does so in short dashes.

Cochleoceps orientalis is known to clean parasites from red or other morwongs, leatherjackets (often known as ocean jackets), eastern blue gropers, boxfish, and porcupinefish.

== Life cycle ==
Adults deposit their eggs on kelp, with both males and females remaining at the site. However, only the male guards them.
