= Truncate coralfish =

Truncate coralfish is a common name for several fishes and may refer to:

- Chelmonops curiosus, native to the eastern Indian Ocean and western Australia
- Chelmonops truncatus, native to eastern Australia
