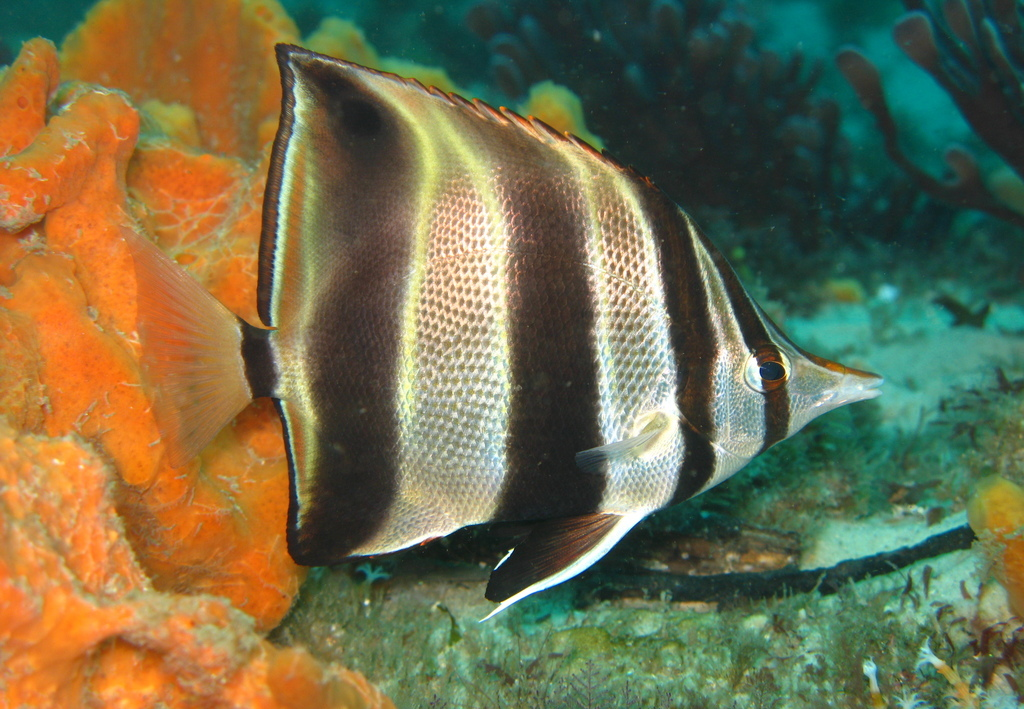
- Truncate coralfish (C. truncatus)

Scientific classification
- Kingdom: Animalia
- Phylum: Chordata
- Class: Actinopterygii
- Order: Acanthuriformes
- Family: Chaetodontidae
- Genus: Chelmonops; Bleeker, 1876

Type species
- Chaetodon truncatus Kner, 1859

= Chelmonops =

Genus of fishes

Chelmonops is a small genus of ray-finned fish, butterflyfishes from the family Chaetodontidae. Unlike the mainly tropical distribution of most marine butterflyfishes, Chelmonops is restricted to temperate and subtropical coastal waters along the southern half of Australia.

The name of the genus is a compound of the genus name Chelmon coined by Georges Cuvier for the genus that C. truncatus was originally placed in, and the word ops which means “resembles”.

== Species ==
There are currently two recognized species in this genus:

- Chelmonops curiosus Kuiter, 1986 (Western talma)
- Chelmonops truncatus (Kner, 1859) (Eastern talma)
