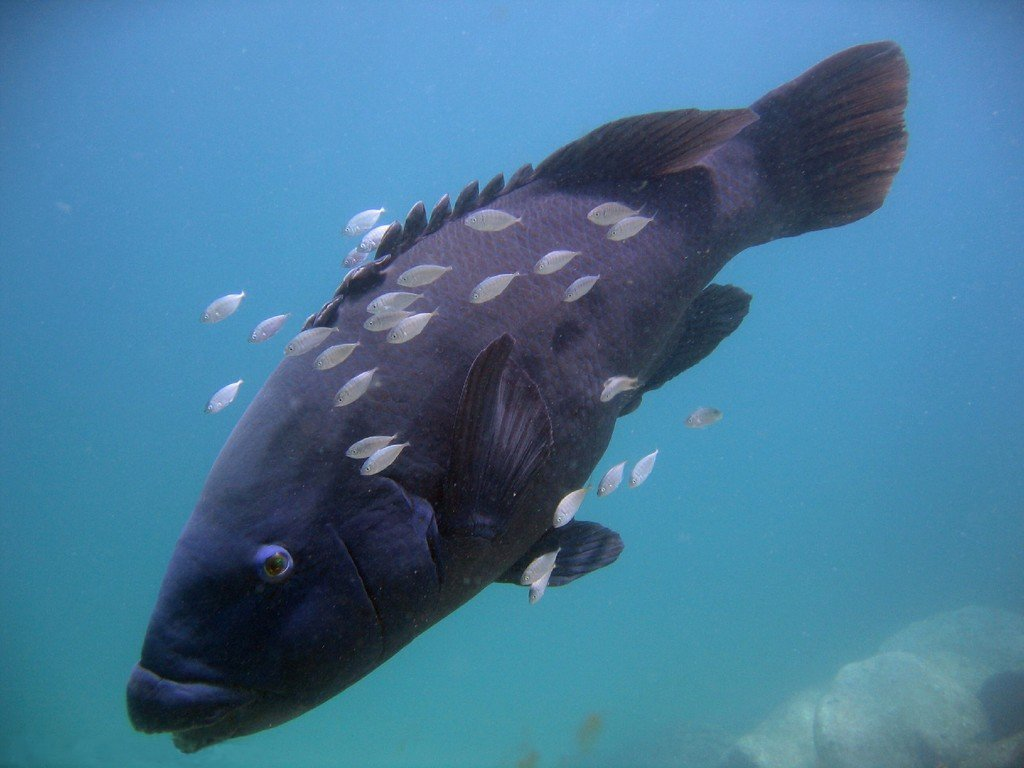
- Achoerodus viridis

Scientific classification
- Kingdom: Animalia
- Phylum: Chordata
- Class: Actinopterygii
- Order: Labriformes
- Family: Labridae
- Subfamily: Hypsigenyinae
- Genus: Achoerodus; T. N. Gill, 1863

Type species
- Labrus gouldii J. Richardson, 1843
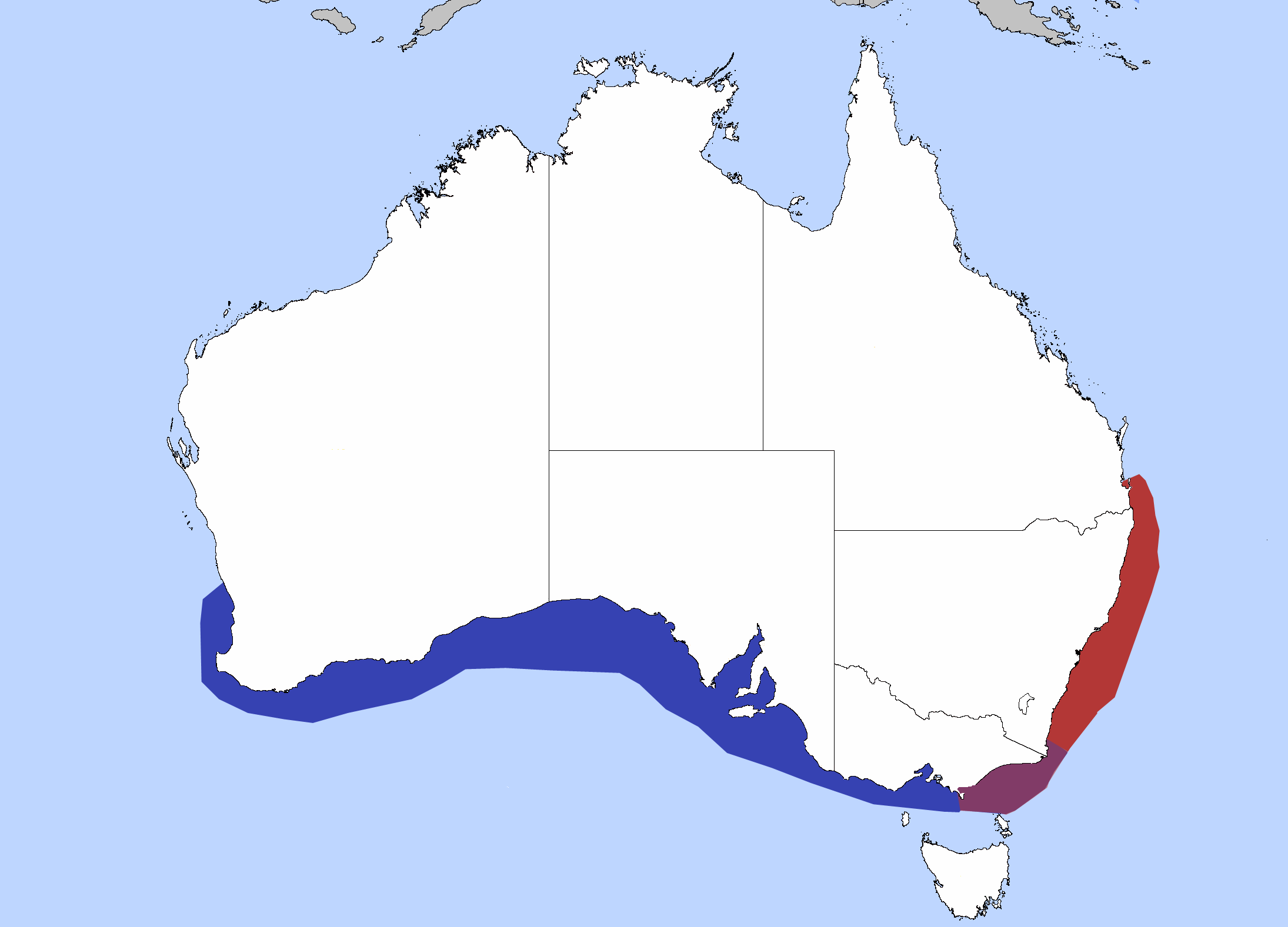
- Distributions: Red = eastern blue groper Dark blue = western blue groper

Synonyms
- Heterochoerops Steindachner, 1866; Platychoerops Klunzinger, 1879

= Blue groper =

Genus of fishes

Achoerodus is a genus of wrasses collectively known as blue gropers. Both of the two species in the genus are found in the coastal waters of southern Australia and distinguished by the bright blue colouring of the adult males.

The thick-bodied blue gropers have peg teeth, heavy scales, large tails and thick lips. Juveniles are brown to green brown. Adult females are brown to greenish-yellow. Each scale may have a darker red spot. The adult males have the bright blue colouring that give the fish their name. The blue can range from deep navy to cobalt blue, and there may also be darker or yellow-orange spots or lines around the eyes.

All blue gropers begin life as females. As they mature, they go through an initial phase, in which they may be male or female, before developing their adult colouring and reaching the terminal phase.

Typically you will only find one or two male blue gropers in an area, with a larger number of the female gropers in the same area. Should the dominant male blue groper die, the largest female will grow, change colour and sex, and become the dominant male.

In Australia, certain states like New South Wales have granted protection to this species. It is considered the state fish symbol for the territory and it is illegal to spear blue groper. There is also a limitation on fishing for them with a line. They are extremely inquisitive, and while it is now discouraged to feed them by cutting up urchins, they still will approach divers as if expecting to be fed.

The fish live in a variety of coastal waters, especially exposed reefs.

In 1998, the eastern blue groper was made the state fish emblem of New South Wales.

== Biology ==
Both species are very long lived fish. The western blue groper has been recorded living for as long as 70 years, making it the longest lived wrasse species alongside the foxfish.

== Species ==
The currently recognized species in this genus are:

- Achoerodus gouldii (J. Richardson, 1843) (western blue groper)
- Achoerodus viridis (Steindachner, 1866) (eastern blue groper)

== See also ==
- Gus, a well-known blue groper that was killed in Australia in 2023

== Sources ==
- "Eastern Blue Groper". Fishes. Australian Museum. Archived from the original on 11 October 2006.
- "Blue Groper". Sportsfish Australia. Archived from the original on 15 November 2006.
- "Eastern Blue Groper". Fish'n'kids. New South Wales Department of Primary Industries. Archived from the original on 17 October 2006.
- "Eastern Blue Groper". Marine Education Society of Australasia.
