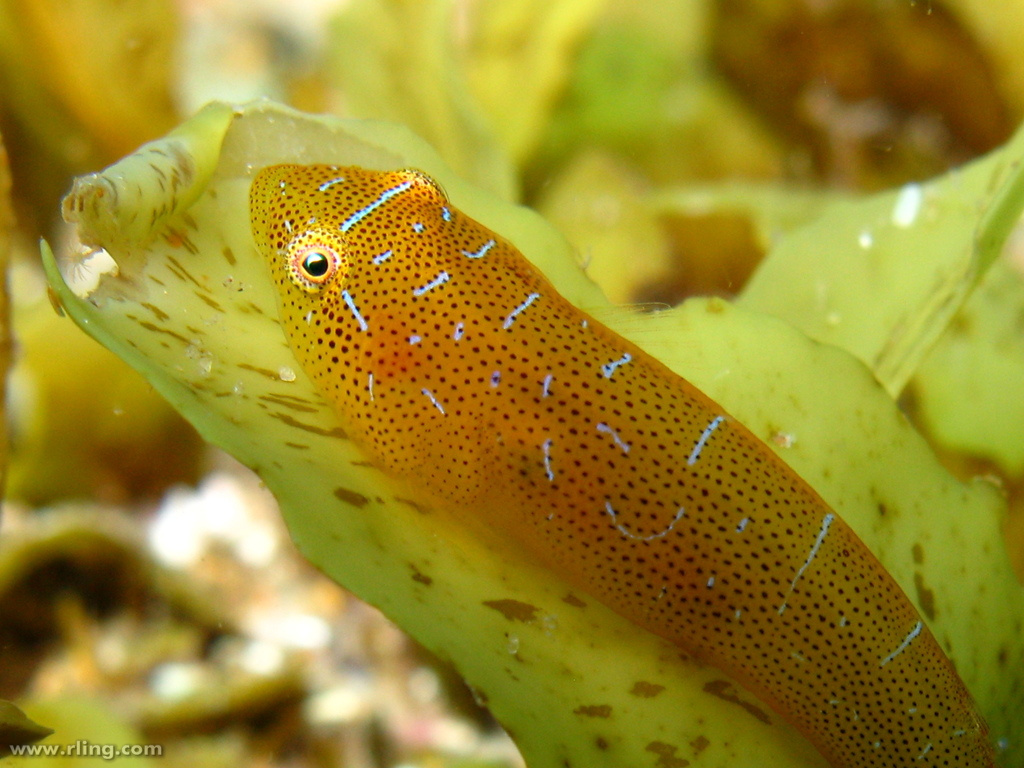
- Eastern Cleaner-clingfish (C. orientalis)

Scientific classification
- Kingdom: Animalia
- Phylum: Chordata
- Class: Actinopterygii
- Division: Teleostei
- Order: Blenniiformes
- Family: Gobiesocidae
- Subfamily: Gobiesocinae
- Genus: Cochleoceps; Whitley, 1943

Type species
- Crepidogaster spatula Günther, 1861

= Cochleoceps =

Genus of fishes

Cochleoceps is a genus of clingfishes endemic to the waters around Australia.

== Species ==
There are currently five recognized species in this genus:

- Cochleoceps bassensis Hutchins, 1983
- Cochleoceps bicolor Hutchins, 1991 (Western cleaner-clingfish)
- Cochleoceps orientalis Hutchins, 1991 (Eastern cleaner-clingfish)
- Cochleoceps spatula (Günther, 1861)
- Cochleoceps viridis Hutchins, 1991 (Green clingfish)
