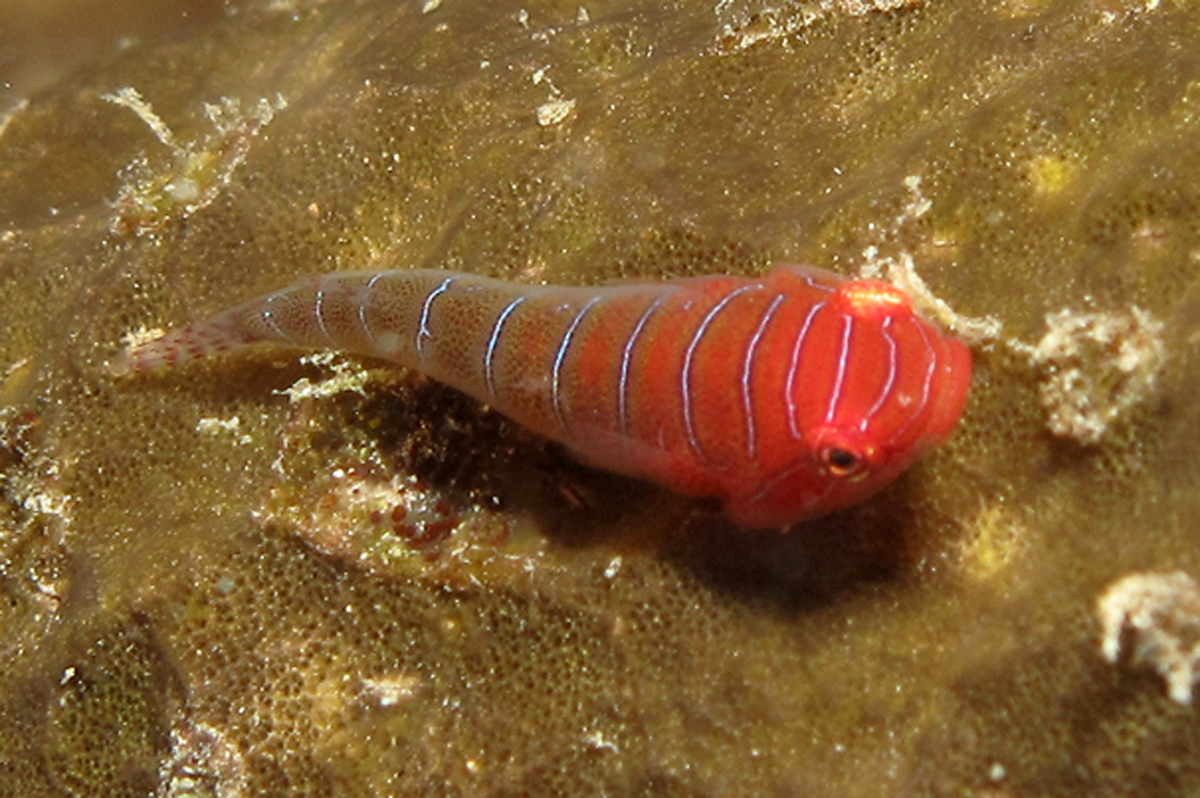

Scientific classification
- Kingdom: Animalia
- Phylum: Chordata
- Class: Actinopterygii
- Order: Blenniiformes
- Family: Gobiesocidae
- Genus: Cochleoceps
- Species: C. bicolor

Binomial name
- Cochleoceps bicolor Hutchins, 1991

= Cochleoceps bicolor =

Species of fish

Cochleoceps bicolor, the western cleaner clingfish, is a species of clingfish from the family Gobiesocidae which is endemic to southern Australia. The distribution of this species extends from Lancelin, Western Australia to Port Phillip in Victoria. C. bicolor was described in 1991 by Barry Hutchins from a type locality of Flinders Island.

== Description ==
The western cleaner clingfish has a ground colouration which varies from yellowish to reddish marked with regular transverse blue bands along its back and a bluish-grey caudal fin. They are thought to feed on parasites which they clean off larger fish.

This species occurs on rocky reefs and jetty or pier piles, where they establish cleaning stations, often over sponges and ascidians. They are known to use a wide variety of reef-related sites as stations, perhaps the most important criterion being the prominent visibility of a site to passing parasite-laden species. A station may have from one to multiple western cleaner clingfish, depending on the demand for services and other factors. Some divers have observed shared stations, where several other known temperate marine cleaner host species-notably juvenile moonlighter fish (Tilodon sexfasciatus) and rockpool shrimp (Palaemon serenus) - behave in cooperative fashion, possibly when client demand peaks, tide and season depending.
