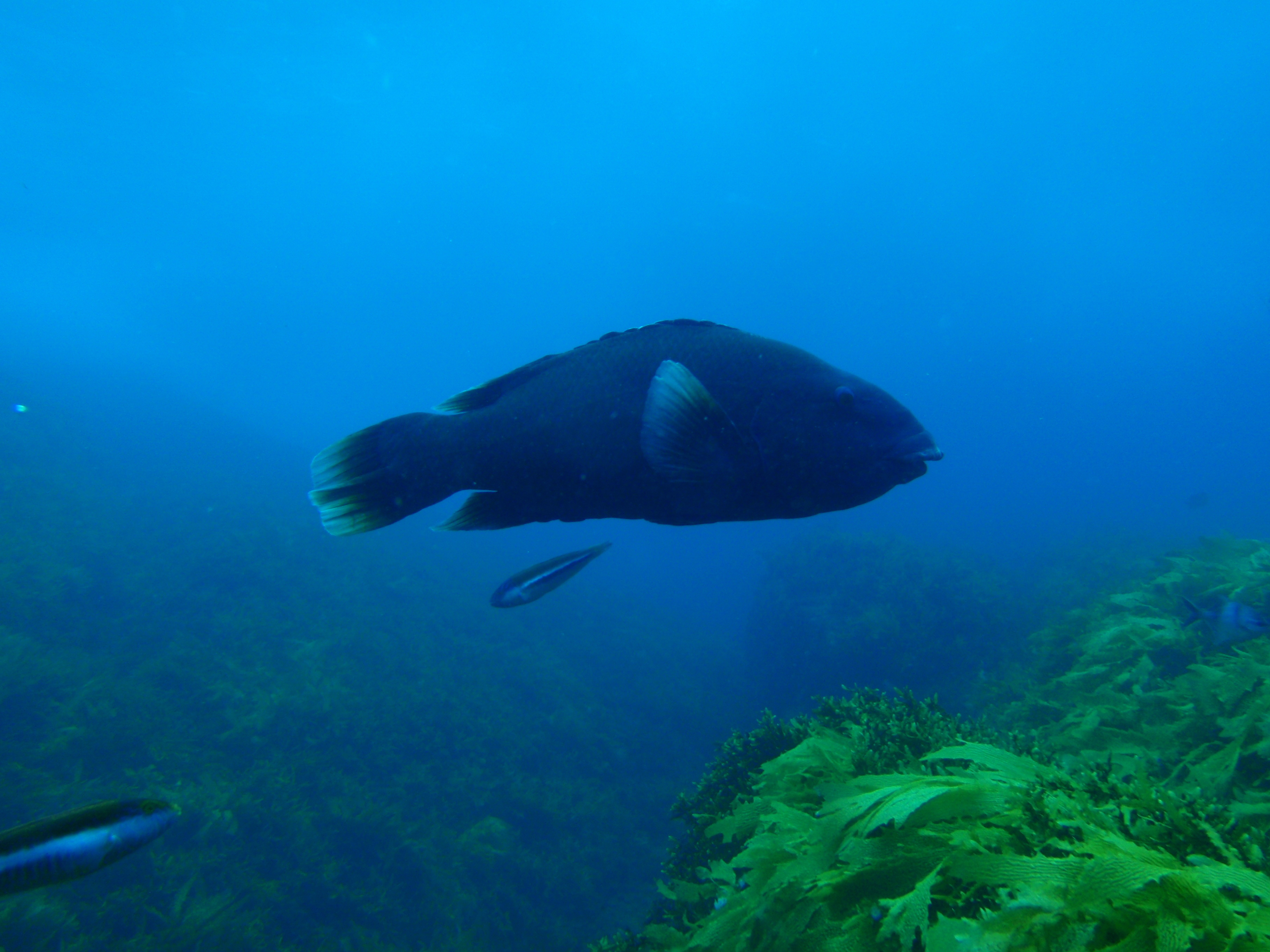
- Male

Conservation status
- Vulnerable (IUCN 3.1)

Scientific classification
- Kingdom: Animalia
- Phylum: Chordata
- Class: Actinopterygii
- Order: Labriformes
- Family: Labridae
- Genus: Achoerodus
- Species: A. gouldii

Binomial name
- Achoerodus gouldii (J. Richardson, 1843)
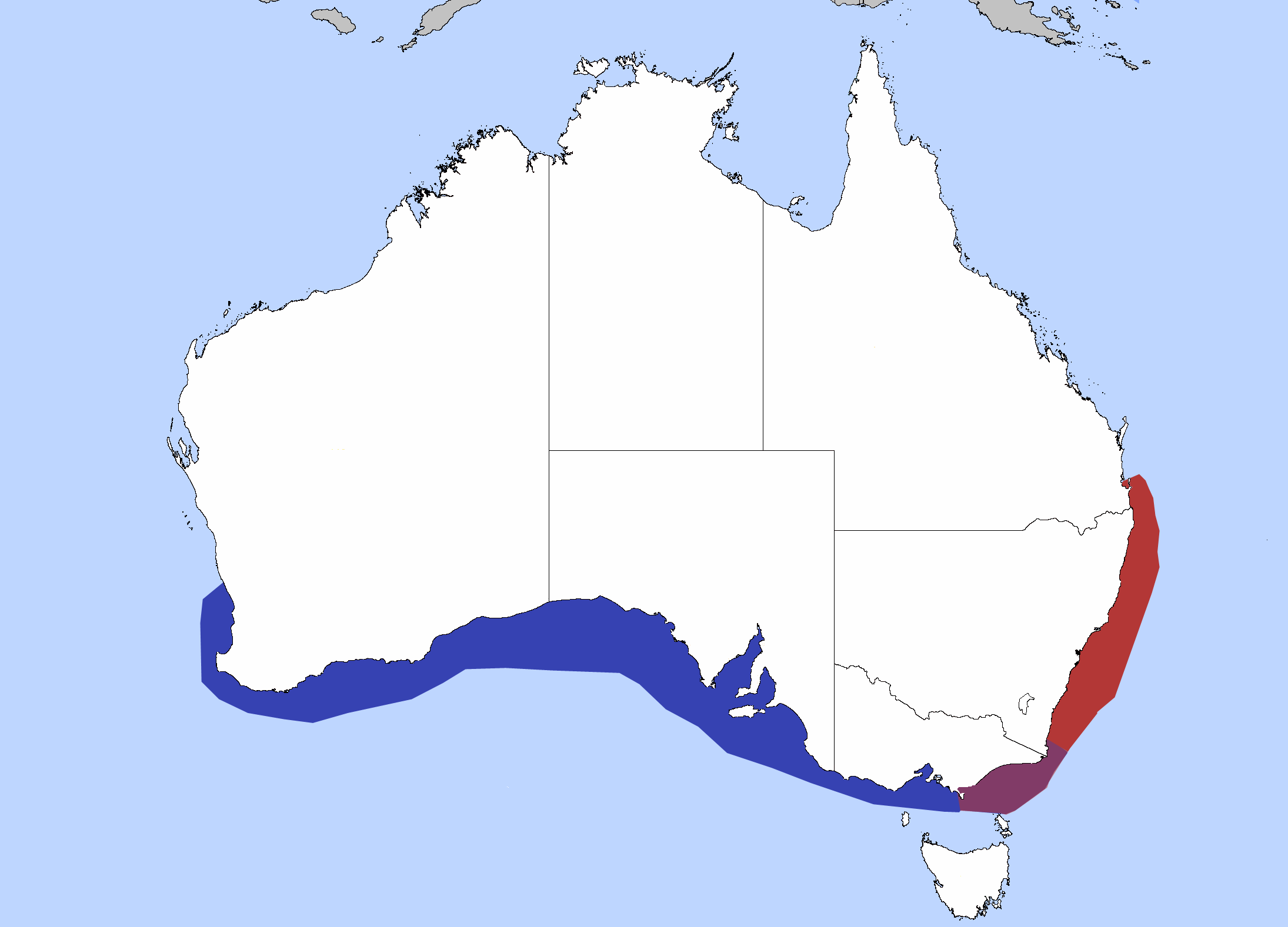
- Dark blue = western blue groper

Synonyms
- Labrus gouldii J. Richardson, 1843; Platychoerops muelleri Klunzinger, 1879

= Achoerodus gouldii =

Species of fish

The western blue groper (Achoerodus gouldii) is a species of wrasse native to coastal waters of southern Australia from the Houtman Abrolhos in Western Australia to west of Melbourne.

This species prefers areas with rocky substrates and can be found at depths of from 1 to 65 m. Their diet consists of other fishes, crabs, lobster, various molluscs including abalone, and starfish. This species grows to a length of 175 cm (69 in). Weights of up to 40 kg (88 lb) have been recorded. It has been recorded living for up to 70 years, making it the longest lived wrasse species recorded alongside the foxfish. They have a single long-based dorsal fin, a large squarish tail, thick fleshy lips, large heavy scales and peg-like teeth.

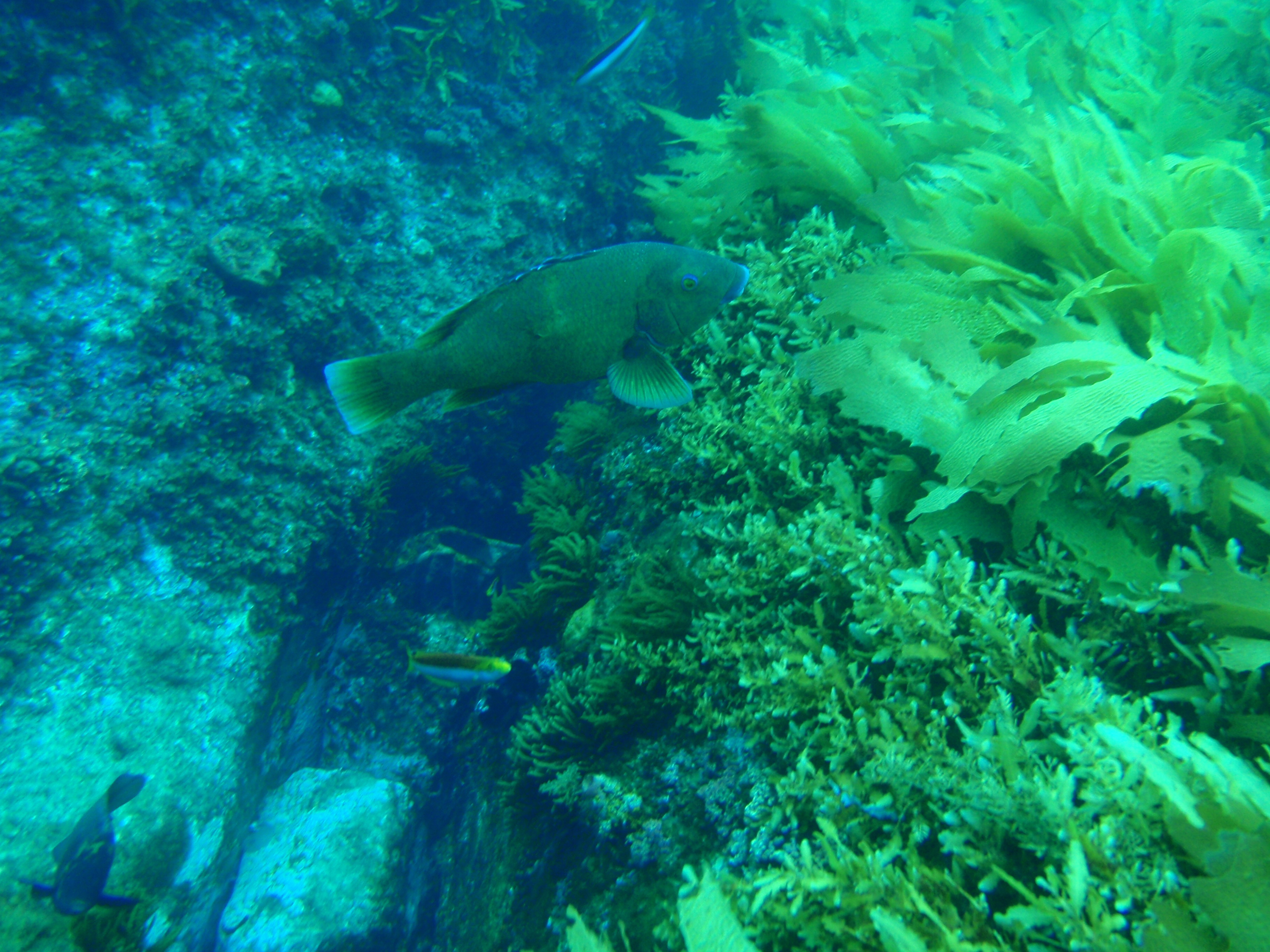
Female

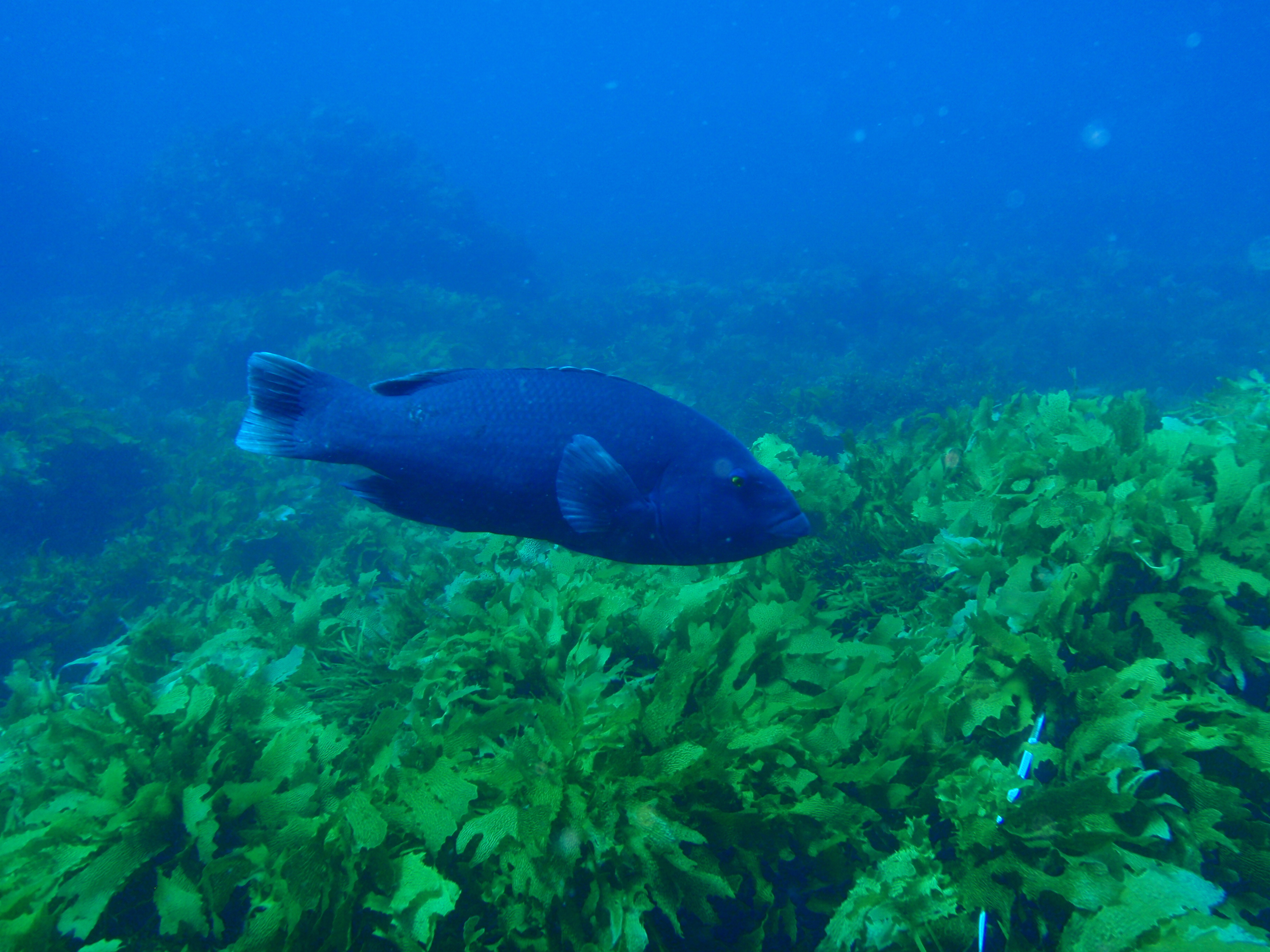
Male

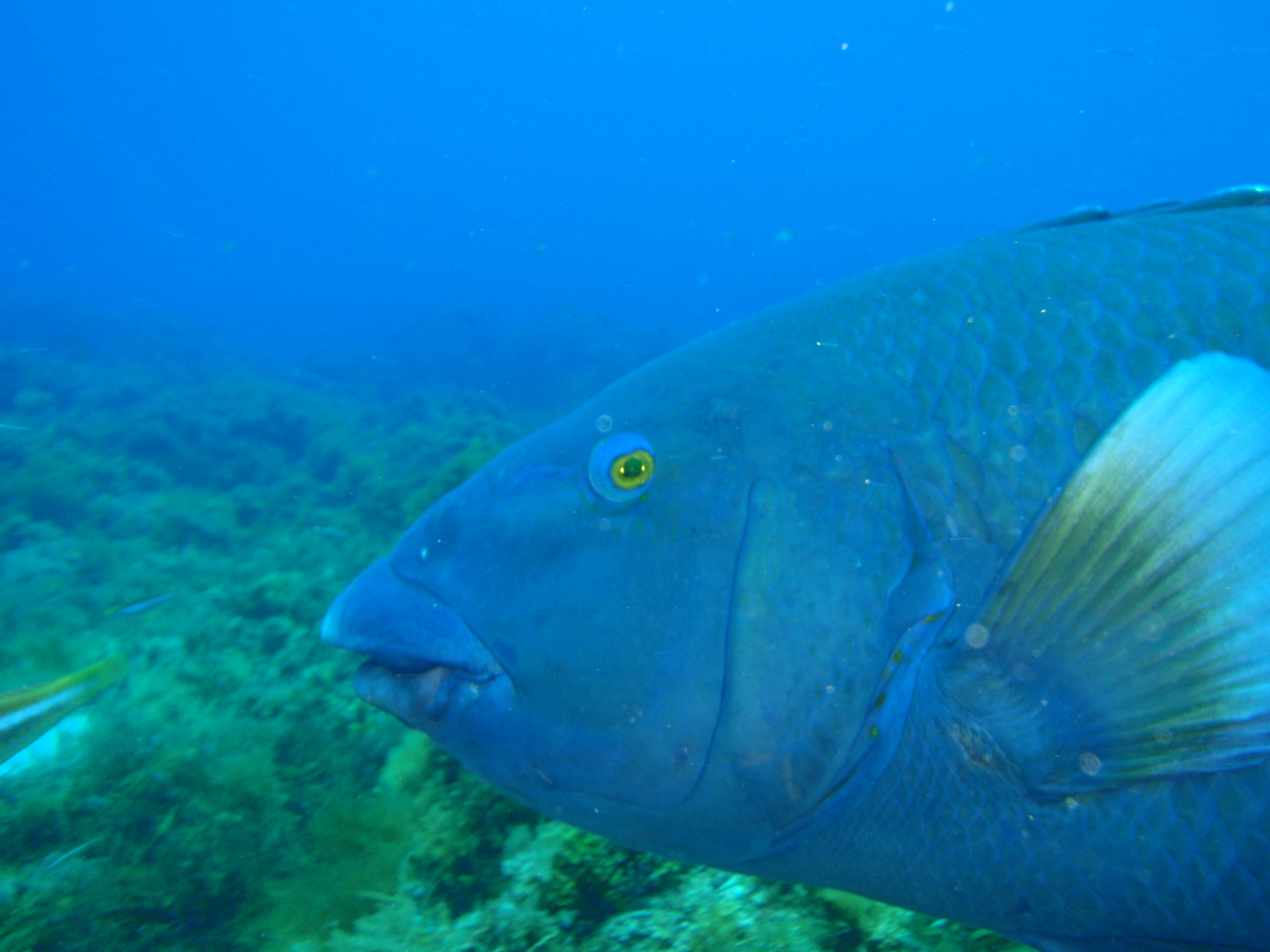

== Taxonomy ==
The species was formally described by the naturalist John Richardson in 1843 from a specimen taken to the British Museum (Natural History) by John Gould, who Richardson honoured in the specific name he gave to this fish.

== Conservation ==
This species is of minor importance to local commercial fisheries.

In South Australia the species is protected in Spencer Gulf, St Vincent Gulf, Investigator Strait and Backstairs Passage. The species is occasionally caught by line and spear fishers. Conservationists and some scientists argue that state-wide protection is needed to achieve ecologically meaningful results. It is considered by many experts to be functionally extinct in Gulf Saint Vincent and mature adults are now rare in Spencer Gulf. In light of the fact that it's the top order territorial bony rocky reef fish in this State, full protection should be a matter of high priority.

Outside of spatial closures, recreational fishers are allowed to catch one Western blue groper per day in South Australia and Western Australia. The fish is fully protected in Victorian waters.
