= Gus (fish) =

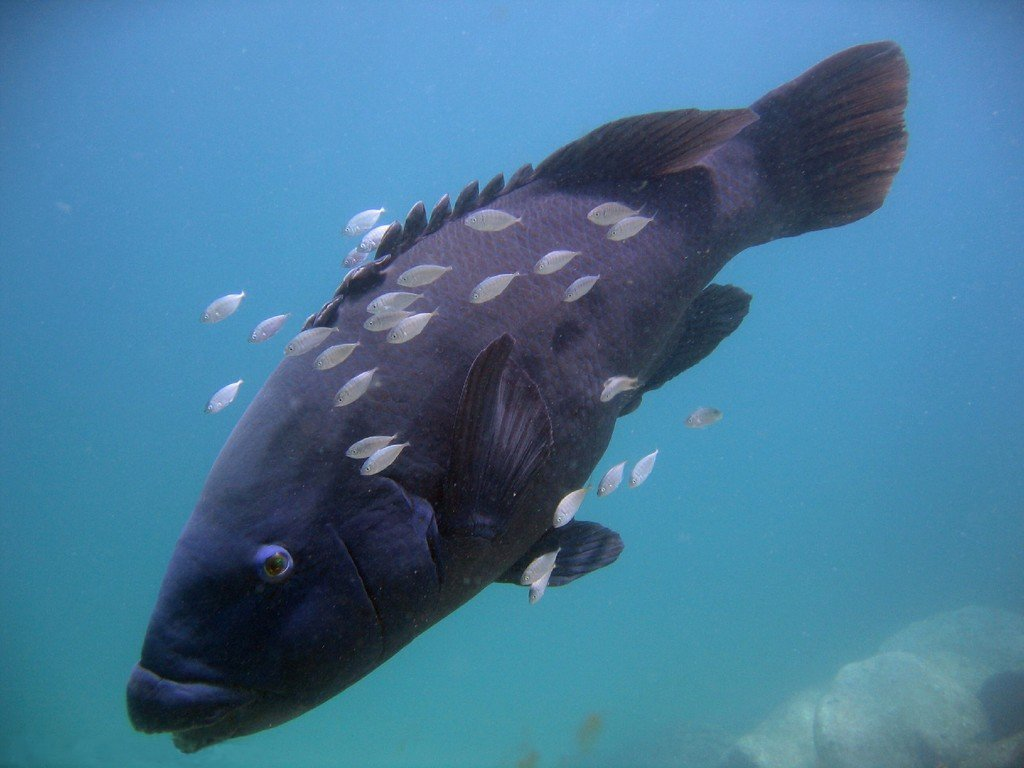
- A blue groper, similar to Gus
- Other name: Gus the Groper
- Born: Between 1983 and 1988; Cronulla, Sydney, Australia
- Died: 30 December 2023 (presumably); Oak Park, Cronulla, Sydney, New South Wales, Australia

Gus (presumably died 30 December 2023) was a blue groper which was known for swimming alongside divers and snorkelers around Oak Park Beach in the Sydney suburb of Cronulla in New South Wales, Australia.

He was estimated to be between 35 and 40 years old, and was affectionately nicknamed "Gus the Groper" by locals.

== Death ==
On 30 December 2023, New South Wales Police officers spoke to a 26-year-old man following reports that a blue groper had been killed at the Oak Park rock pool in Cronulla. It was discovered that the fish had been speared, which was against state fishing regulations as blue gropers are an official state fish. Local media reported the fish was believed by locals to be Gus.

Police were unable to find the fish, which they believed had been returned to the water after being killed. Two days later on 1 January 2024, the man was fined $500.

As a result, the NSW government upheld the spearfishing ban that had been in place for over a decade and in addition, banned all line fishing of the blue groper for a 12 month trial period. This received substantial controversy amongst anglers as the ban was enacted without stock assessments, scientific evidence or consultation with anglers.
