= Telma =

Telma may refer to:

- Telma (TV channel), a channel in North Macedonia
- Gondysia telma, a moth
- Telma, an Israeli brand owned by Unilever
- Telma retarder, a type of eddy current brake

== Places ==
- Telma Darreh, a village in Iran
- Telma (urban-type settlement), a locality in Irkutsk Oblast, Russia
- Telma, Washington, US, an unincorporated community

== People ==
- August & Telma, an Icelandic singing duo
- Telma Björk Fjalarsdóttir (born 1984), Icelandic former basketball player
- Telma Hopkins (born 1948), American actress
- Telma Monteiro (born 1985), Portuguese judoka
- Telma Santos (born 1983), Portuguese badminton player

== See also ==
- Telmar, a fictional country in C. S. Lewis's Narnia
- Thelma (disambiguation)
