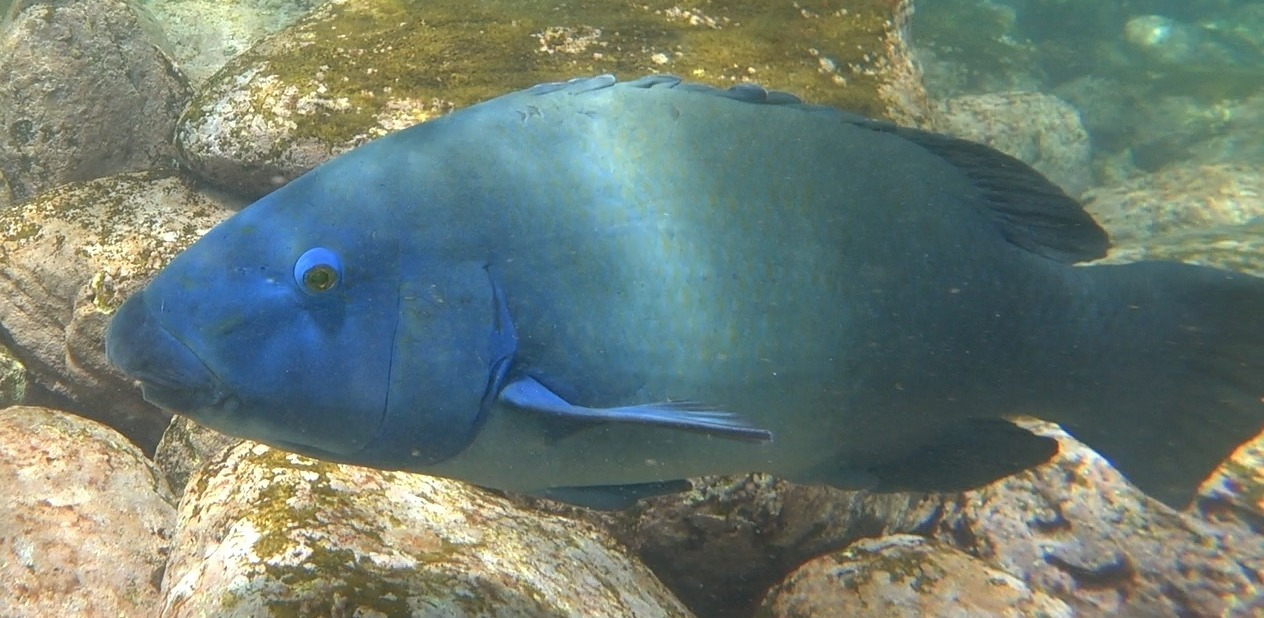

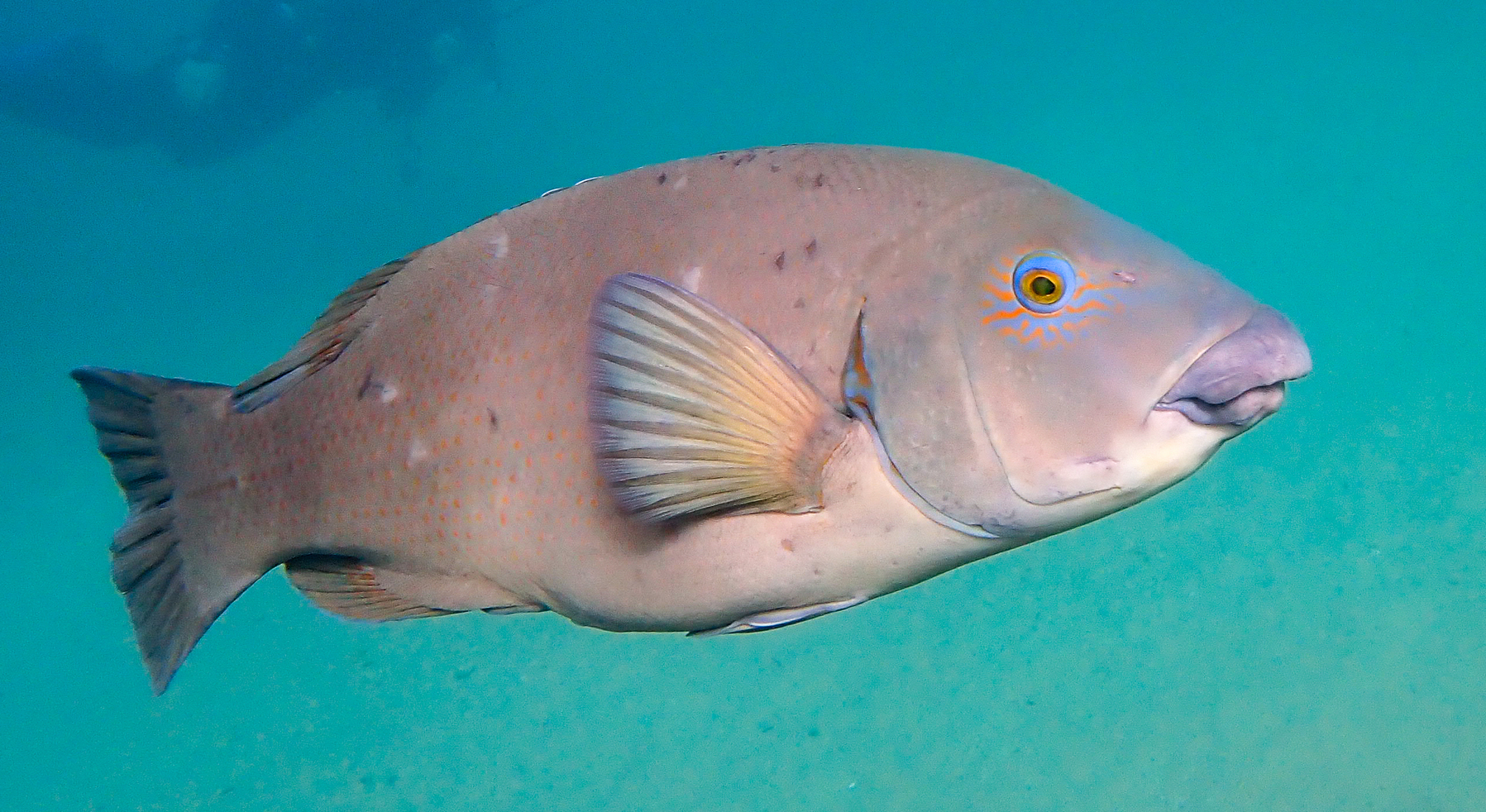
- Male (top) and female (bottom)

Conservation status
- Near Threatened (IUCN 3.1)

Scientific classification
- Kingdom: Animalia
- Phylum: Chordata
- Class: Actinopterygii
- Order: Labriformes
- Family: Labridae
- Genus: Achoerodus
- Species: A. viridis

Binomial name
- Achoerodus viridis (Steindachner, 1866)
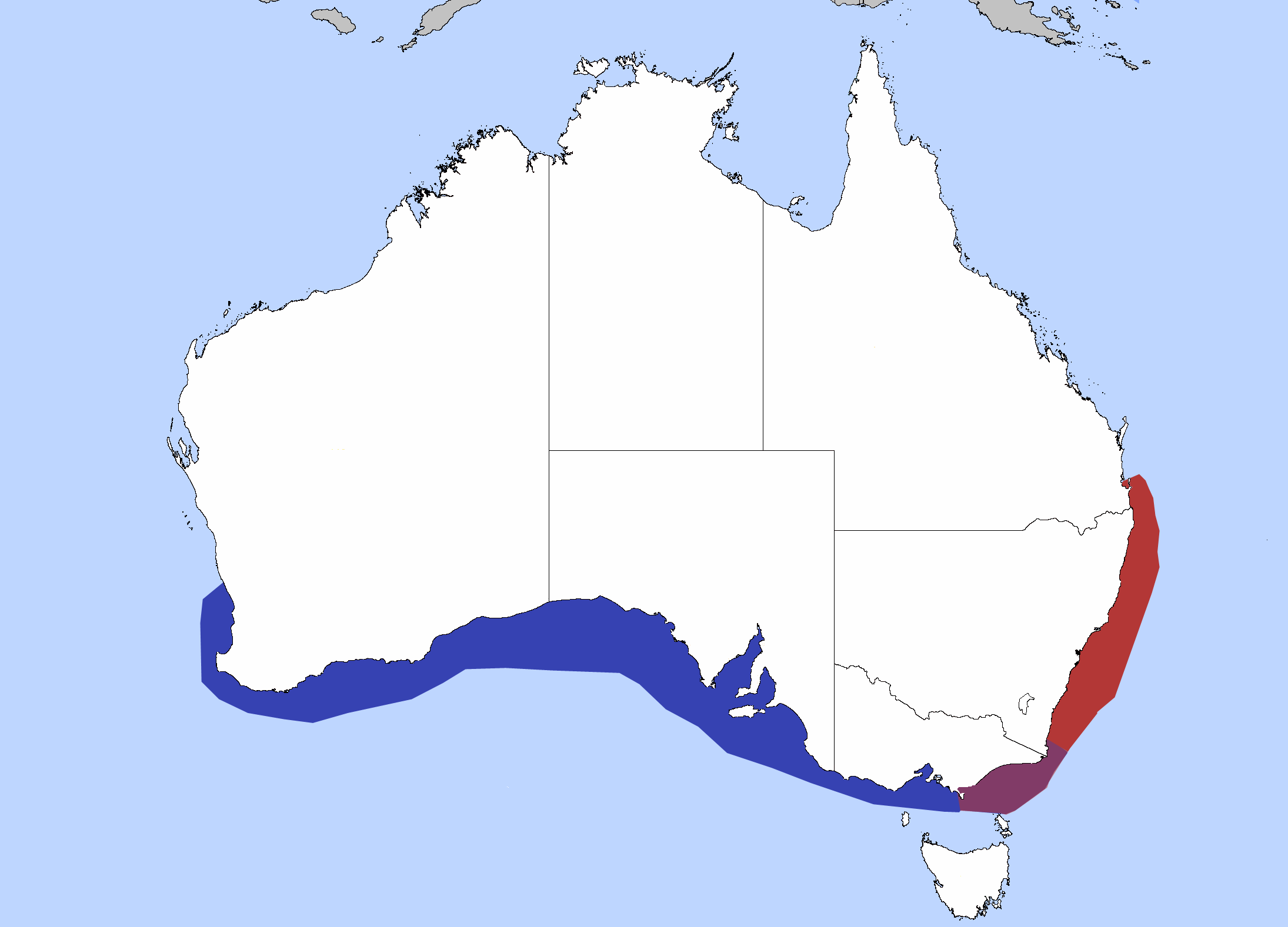
- Red = Eastern blue groper

Synonyms
- Heterochoerops viridis Steindachner, 1866; Trochocopus unicolor Günther, 1876; Platychoerops badius Ogilby, 1893

= Achoerodus viridis =

Species of fish

The eastern blue groper (Achoerodus viridis) is a species of wrasse native to southeastern Australia from Hervey Bay in southern Queensland to Wilsons Promontory in Victoria. They occur in coastal waters, preferring rocky areas at a depth of about 40 m (130 ft). Juveniles inhabit beds of seagrass in estuaries. The diet of this species consists of invertebrates such as various molluscs, crabs, sea urchins, and cunjevoi. This species grows to a length of 100 centimetres (39 inches) as adult males, while females are less than 70 cm (28 in) long. In 1998, the eastern blue groper was made the state fish emblem of New South Wales.

== Distribution and habitat ==
The eastern blue groper is native to the southeastern coast of Australia. Its range extends from Mooloolaba in southern Queensland southwards to Wilsons Promontory in the south of Victoria, including the eastern end of the Bass Strait. Its habitat is rocky areas down to a depth of about 40 m (131 ft).

== Behaviour ==
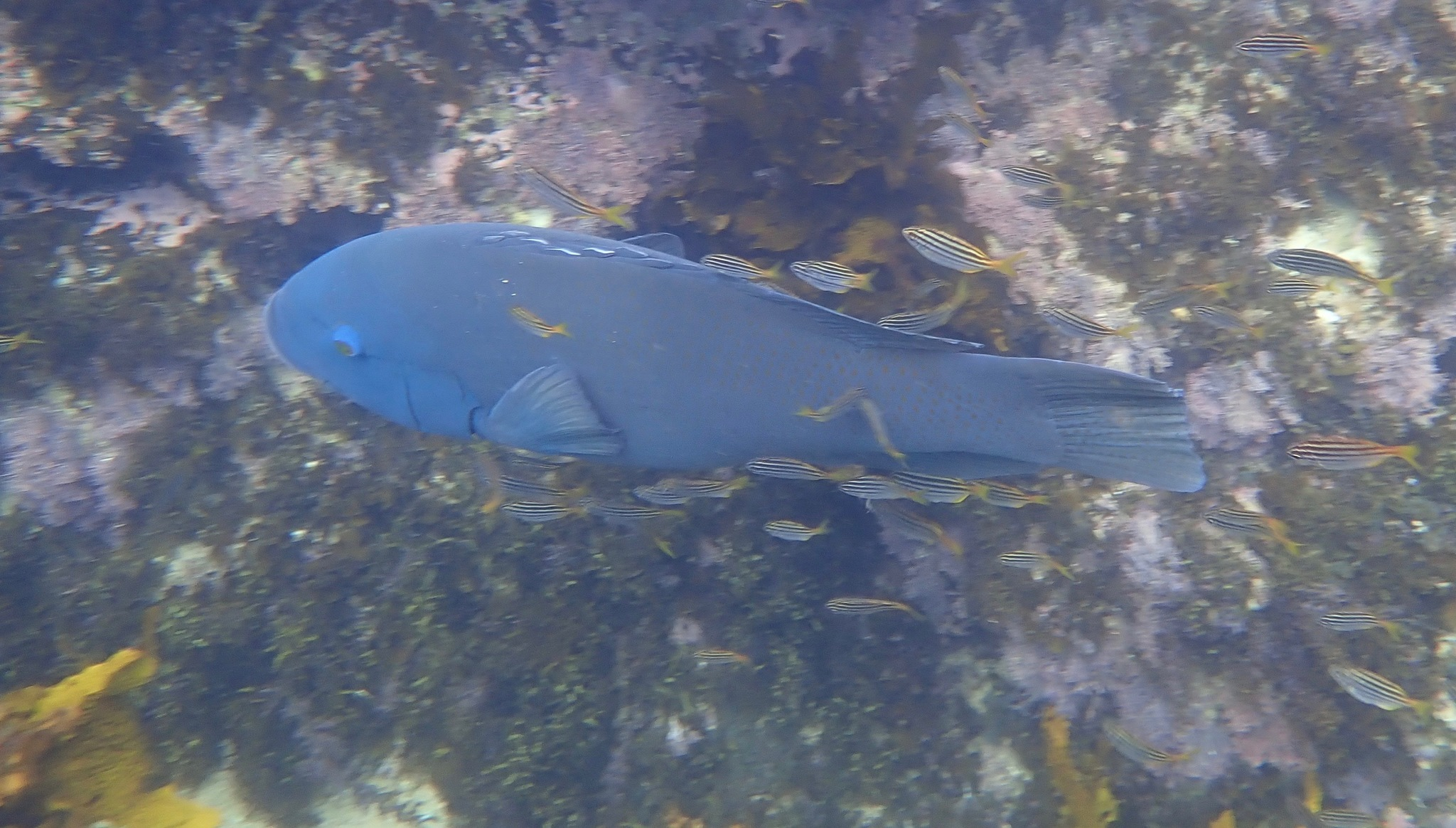
Male being followed by Australian mado.

The eastern blue groper feeds mainly on crabs, shrimps, molluscs and echinoderms. Juvenile fish live in seagrass beds, where their diet is primarily small crustaceans. This fish is a monandric sequential hermaphrodite, always starting life as a female and becoming a male when it has reached a length of at least 60 cm (24 in). Most females are brown, and most males are blue (the sexes may occasionally exhibit the opposite colour). The fish become sexually mature at age two to three, and breeding takes place between July and September. The larvae are planktonic at first and settle in seagrass beds. Females may live for 8–19+ years before they become males.

== Conservation ==
The total range of this fish extends to less than 64,000 km^{2} (25,000 sq mi). It is a slow-growing, long-lived fish, and the generation turnover time is approximately twelve to fifteen years. At one time the population was dwindling because of excessive spearfishing, but in 1972, the New South Wales authorities put a ban in place, preventing all spearfishing and commercial fishing for this species. Its population size since then seems to have stabilised and the IUCN has listed it as being "Near Threatened".

== Gallery ==
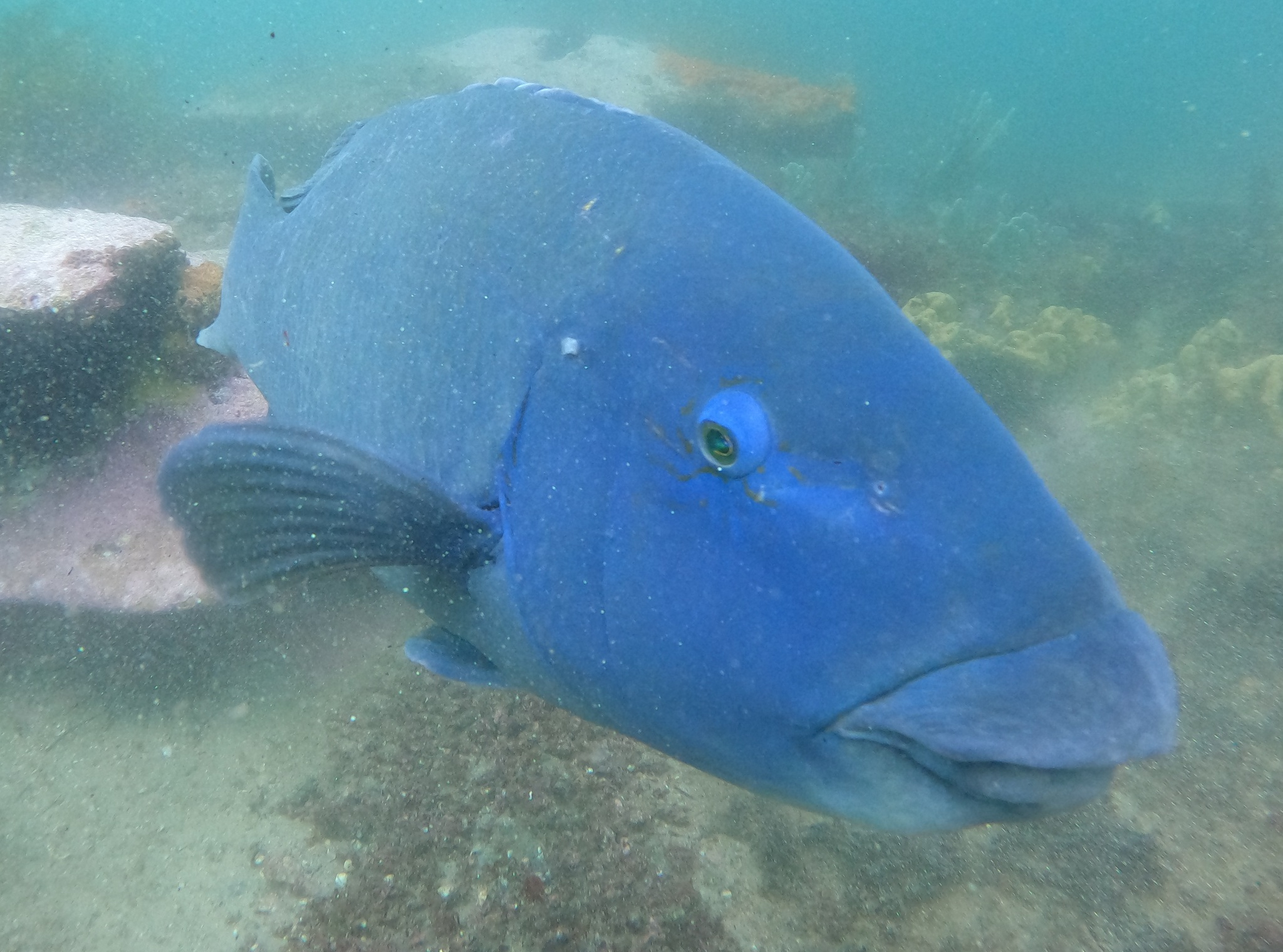

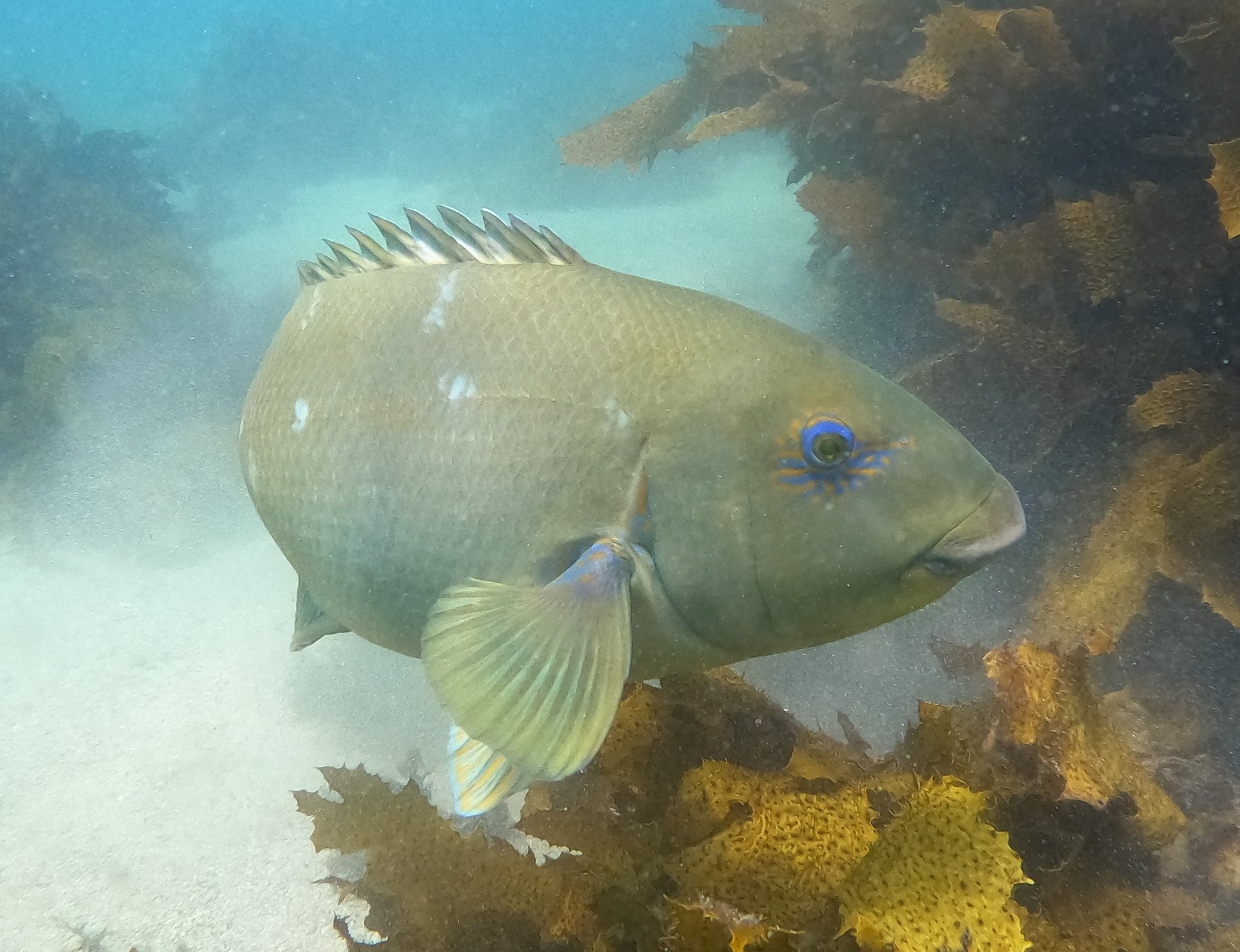

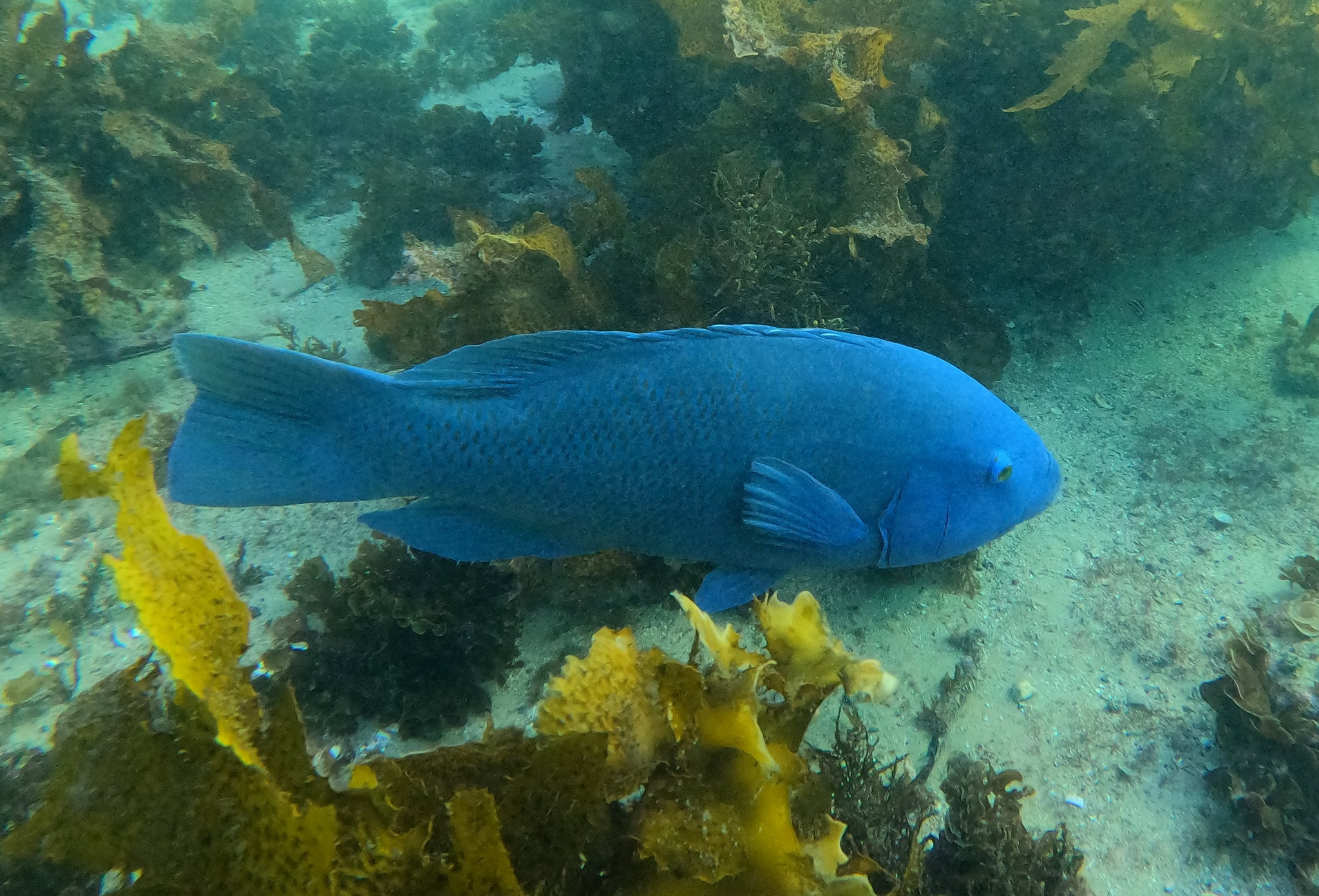

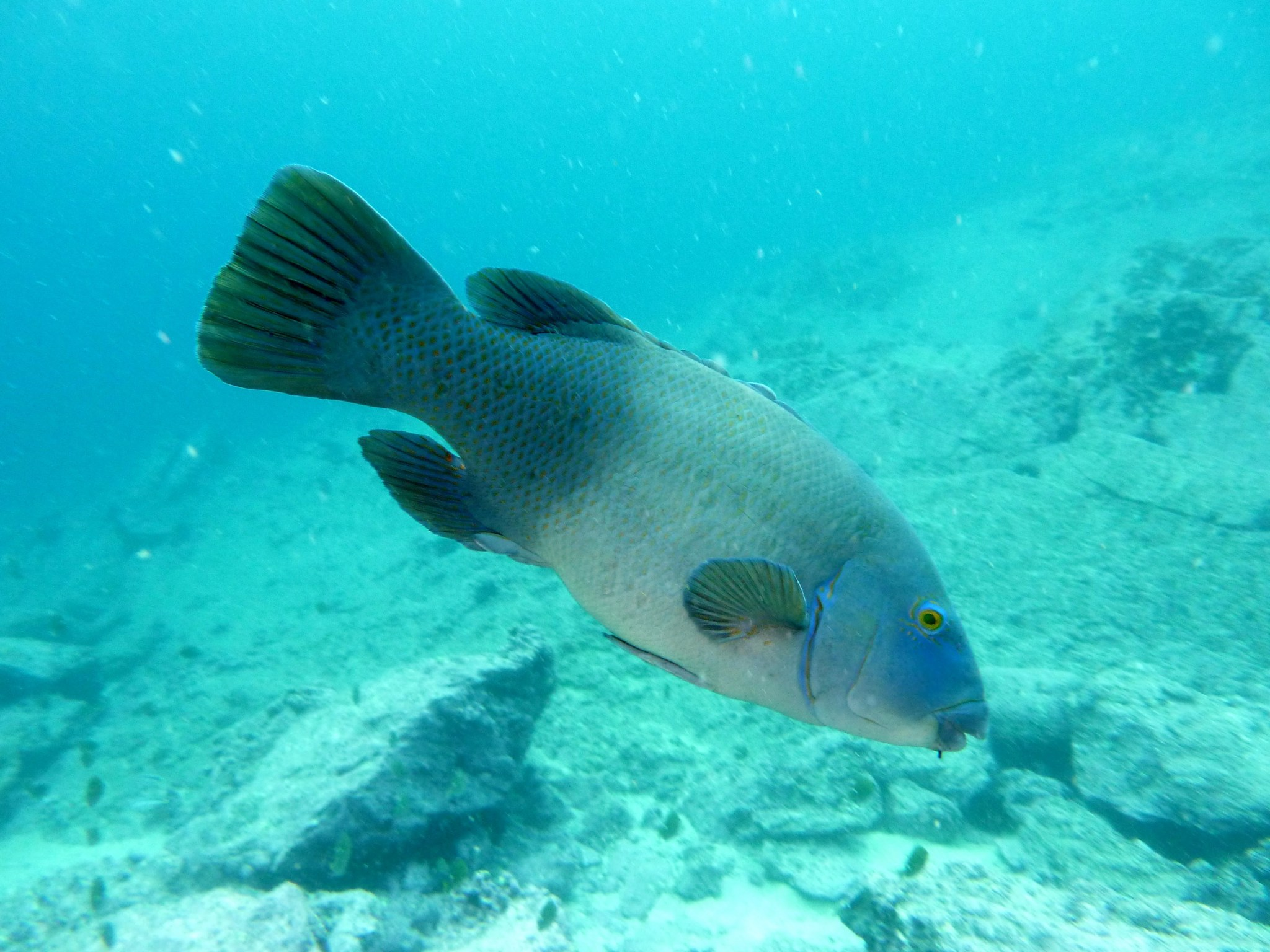

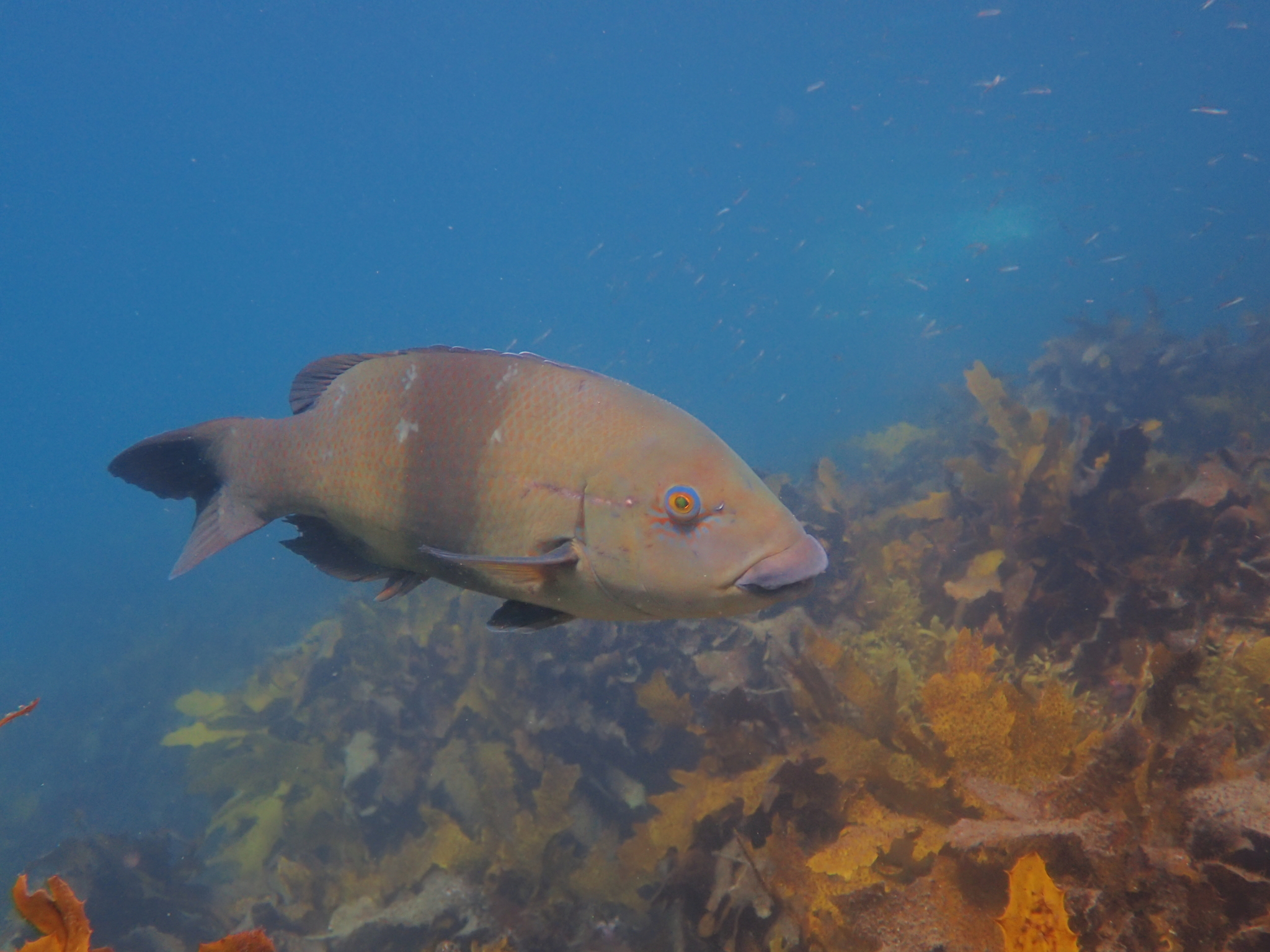

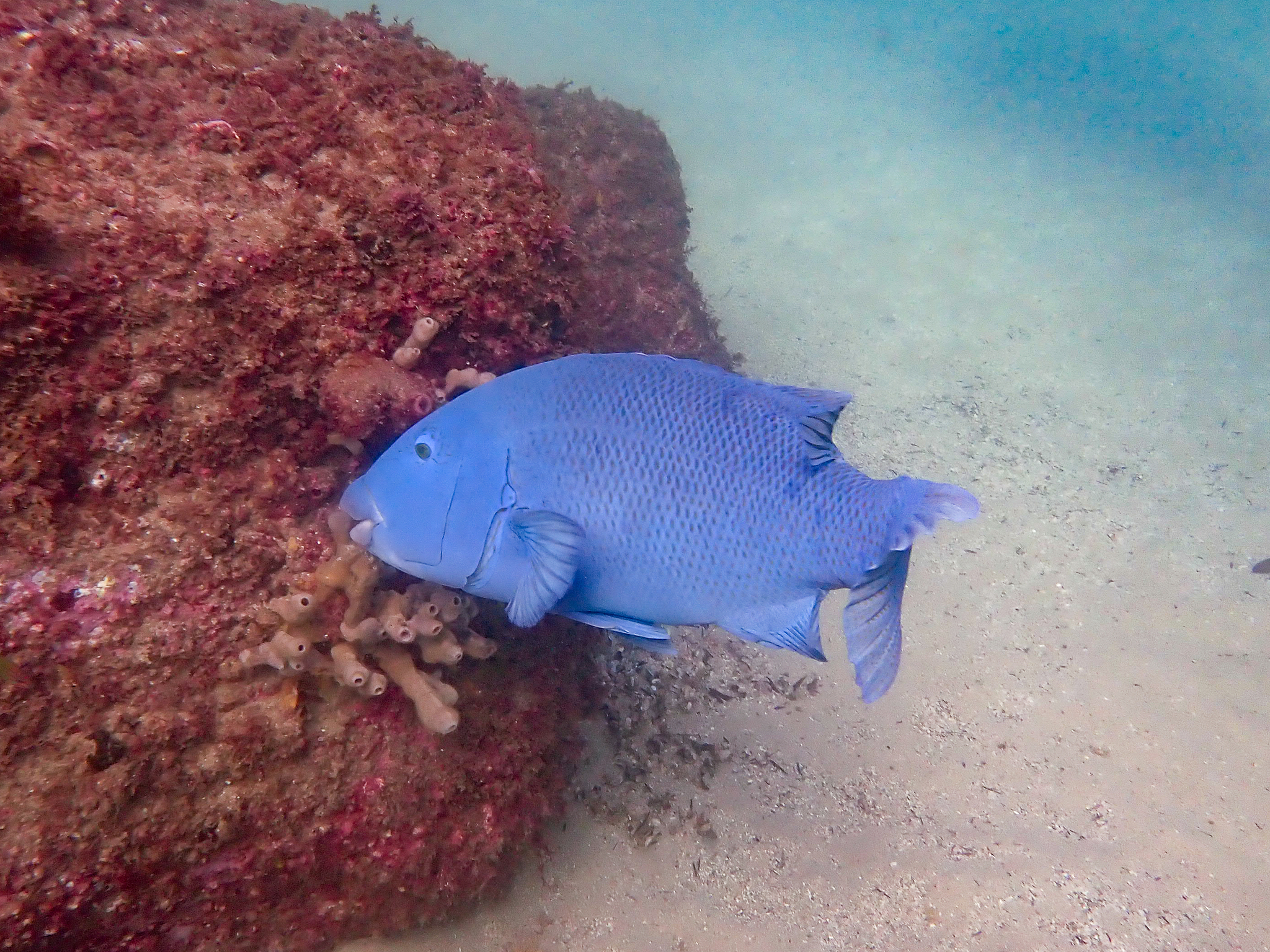

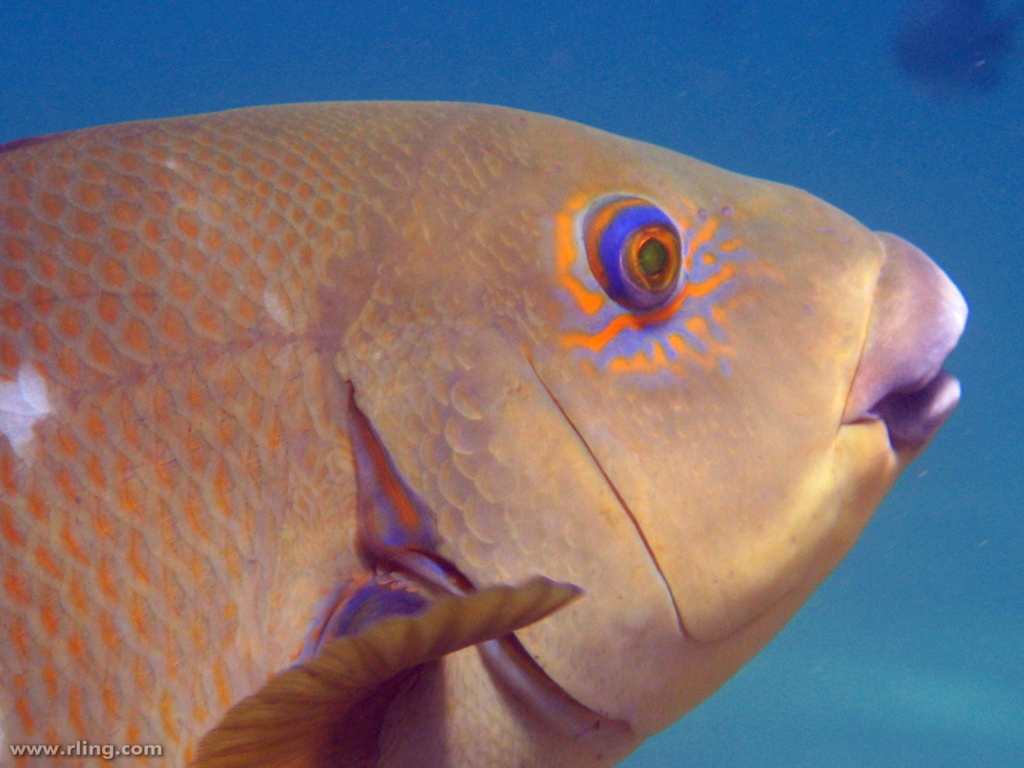

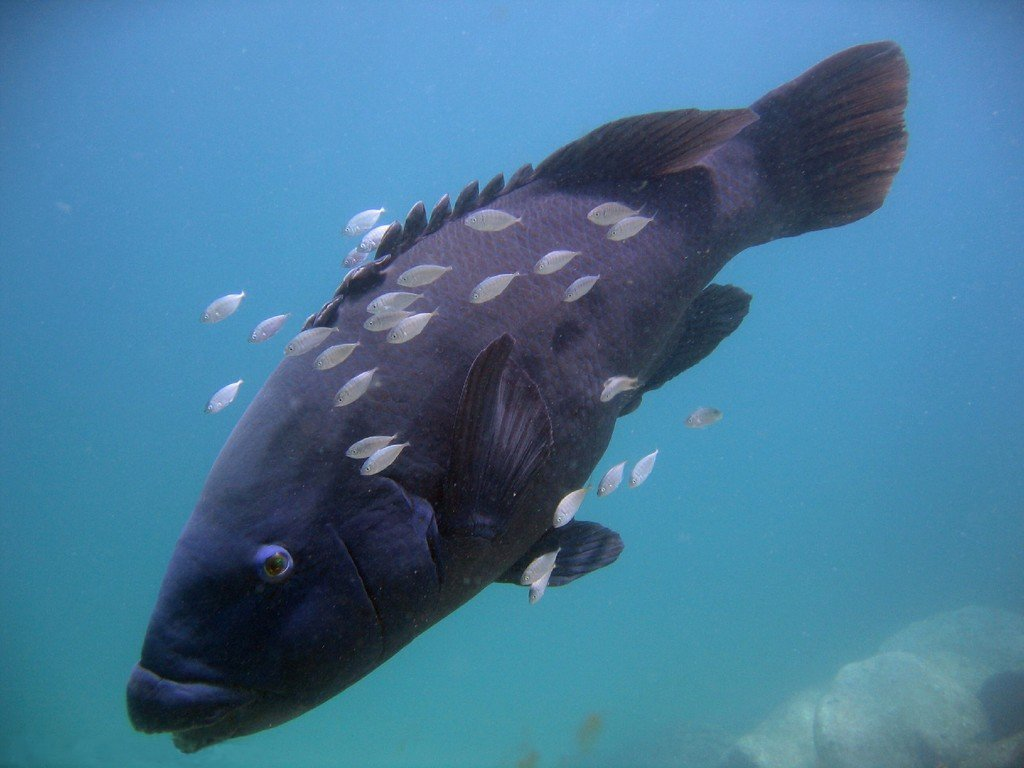

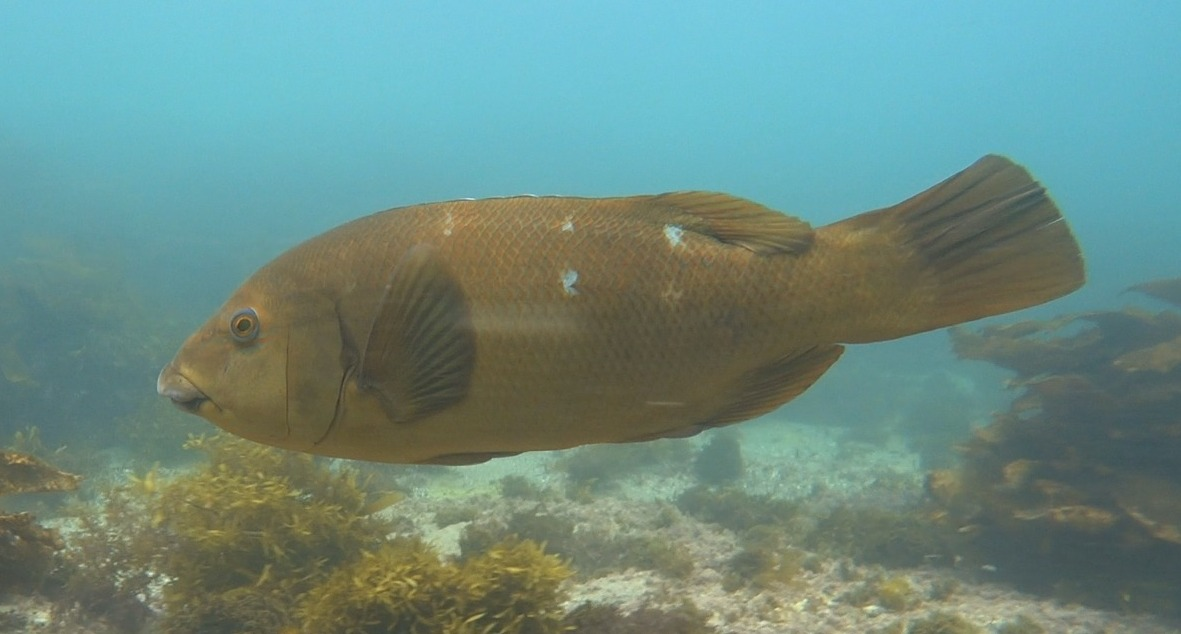

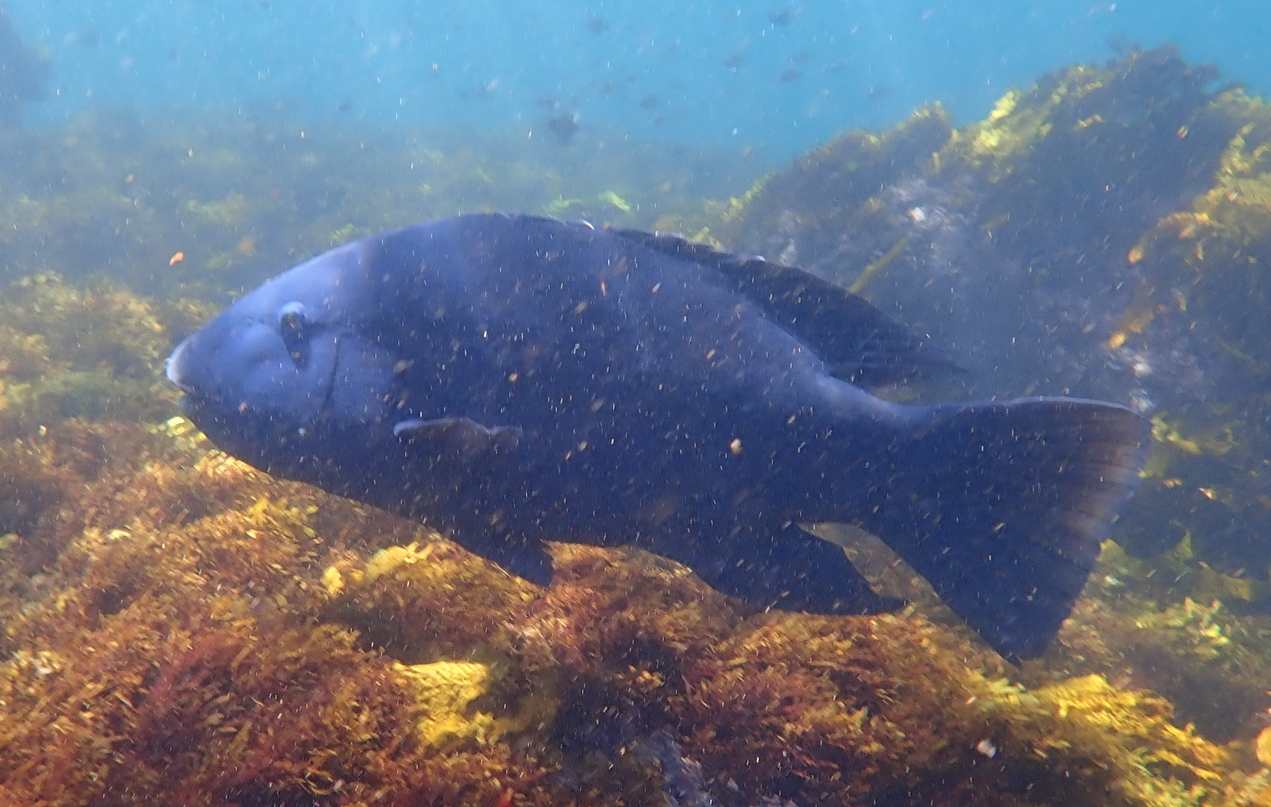
