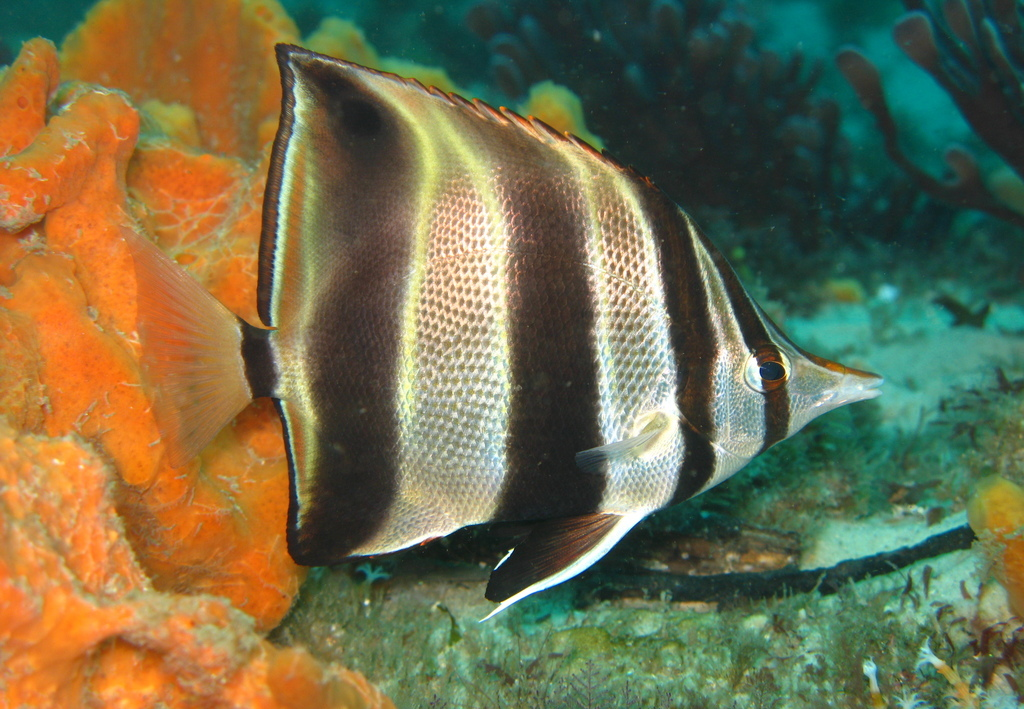

Conservation status
- Least Concern (IUCN 3.1)

Scientific classification
- Kingdom: Animalia
- Phylum: Chordata
- Class: Actinopterygii
- Order: Acanthuriformes
- Family: Chaetodontidae
- Genus: Chelmonops
- Species: C. truncatus

Binomial name
- Chelmonops truncatus (Kner, 1859)

Synonyms
- Chaetodon truncatus Kner, 1859; Chelmo truncatus (Kner, 1859); Chelmo trochilus Günther, 1874; Chelmonops trochilus (Günther, 1874)

= Chelmonops truncatus =

Species of fish

Chelmonops truncatus, the eastern talma or truncate coralfish, is a species of marine ray-finned fish, a butterflyfish from the family Chaetodontidae. It is endemic to Australia.

== Description ==
Chelmonops truncatus bears a close resemblance to the Western talma (C. curiosus), the main difference being that the dorsal fin is truncated, compared to the long filament present on the western species. The fins and dark bands on the body are often tinged vinaceous, giving them a dark, red appearance in some light. Like other butterflyfishes the juveniles have an obvious ocellus on the dorsal fin, but this smudges and becomes less obvious as the fish matures. The smooth profile of the rear part of the dorsal fin is more obvious in younger fish, and this part of the fin becomes slightly elongated in adults. The rear margin of the soft dorsal and anal fins is almost vertical in adults, the fins are more rounded in juveniles. This species attains a maximum total length of 22 centimetres (8.7 in).

== Distribution ==
Chelmonops truncatus is endemic to south eastern Australia where it occurs from Double Island Point in southern Queensland south to around Jervis Bay in New South Wales.

== Habitat and biology ==
Chelmonops truncatus is found in coastal bays and estuaries where they live along deep rocky walls. The adults are normally found in pairs, while the juveniles are frequently encountered alone. Their diet comprises small crustaceans, worms, and filamentous algae. Pairs defend territories.

== Utilisation ==
Chelmonops truncatus is rare in the aquarium trade and is almost never exported from Australia.

== Taxonomy ==
Chelmonops truncatus was first formally described in 1859 as Chaetodon truncatus by the austrian ichthyologist Rudolf Kner (1810-1869) with the type locality given as Sydney. The Dutch ichthyologist Pieter Bleeker (1819-1878) created the genus Chelmonops in 1876 as a monotypic genus with this species as its only member. C. truncatus is, therefore, the type species of Chelmonops.
