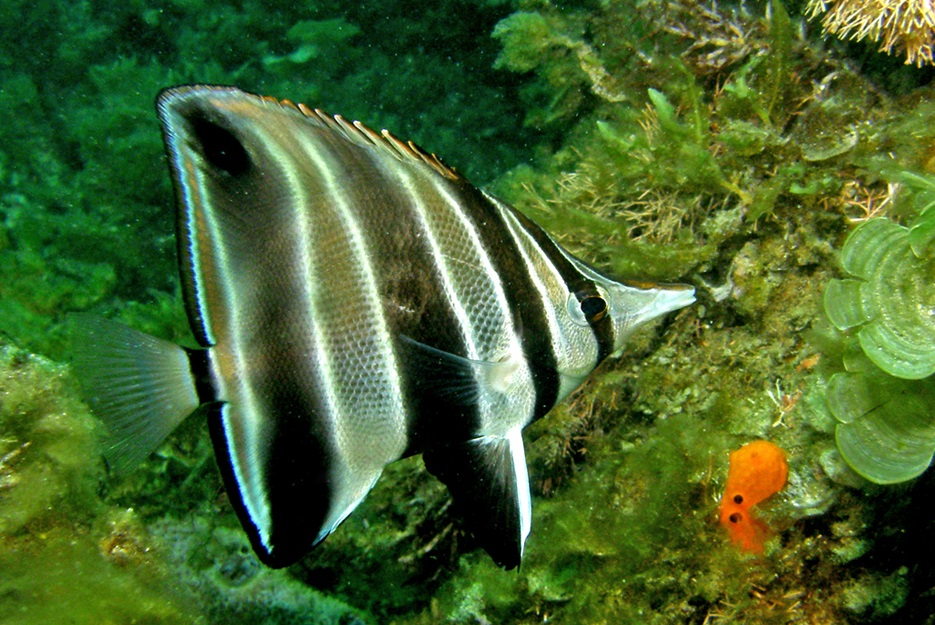

Conservation status
- Least Concern (IUCN 3.1)

Scientific classification
- Kingdom: Animalia
- Phylum: Chordata
- Class: Actinopterygii
- Order: Acanthuriformes
- Family: Chaetodontidae
- Genus: Chelmonops
- Species: C. curiosus

Binomial name
- Chelmonops curiosus Kuiter, 1986

= Chelmonops curiosus =

Species of fish

Chelmonops curiosus, truncate coralfish, truncate butterflyfish, western talma or squareback butterflyfish, is a species of marine ray-finned fish, a butterflyfish from the family Chaetodontidae. It is endemic to Australia.

== Description ==
Chelmonops curiosus has a very deep strongly compressed body, which is more than half its standard length. It has a small head with a long, tapered snout and a tiny mouth at the end of its snout. There is a single, elongated dorsal fin with the separation between the spiny portion and the soft-rayed portion being hardly visible. The first spine is very small but as they progress towards the posterior they become longer and longer. In juveniles the soft part of the dorsal fin is rounded but it is pointed in adults and has a triangular profile when raised. The anal fin is smaller than the dorsal fin. The caudal fin is truncate. The background colour of this fish is steel grey with amounts of black shading different for each individual. They are marked with 4 vertical black bars with silver edged margins, becoming broader towards the tail. The pelvic fins are black. In juveniles there is an ocellus on the soft part of the dorsal fin which fades as they become mature. The spiny part of the dorsal fin contains 11 spines while the soft part has 25-27 soft rays while the anal fin has 3 spines and 19-20 soft rays. This species attains a maximum total length of 26 centimetres (10 in).

== Distribution ==
Chelmonops curiosus is endemic to the seas of Australia where it is found along the south coast from Victor Harbor, South Australia and on the western coast as far north as Shark Bay, Western Australia.

== Habitat and biology ==
Chelmonops curiosus is found on coastal rocky reefs, seeming to prefer vertical rock faces, often where the water is turbid and they will use man-made structures such as pylons and jetties. The juveniles are frequently found swimming among seaweed beds. The adults are normally observed in pairs. This species is omnivorous and its diet comprises small worms, crustaceans, and algae. They breed in pairs. They appear to be territorial, with each pair defending a territory.

== Utilisation ==
Chelmonops curiosus is occasionally collected for the aquarium trade. It is rarely exported from Australia.
