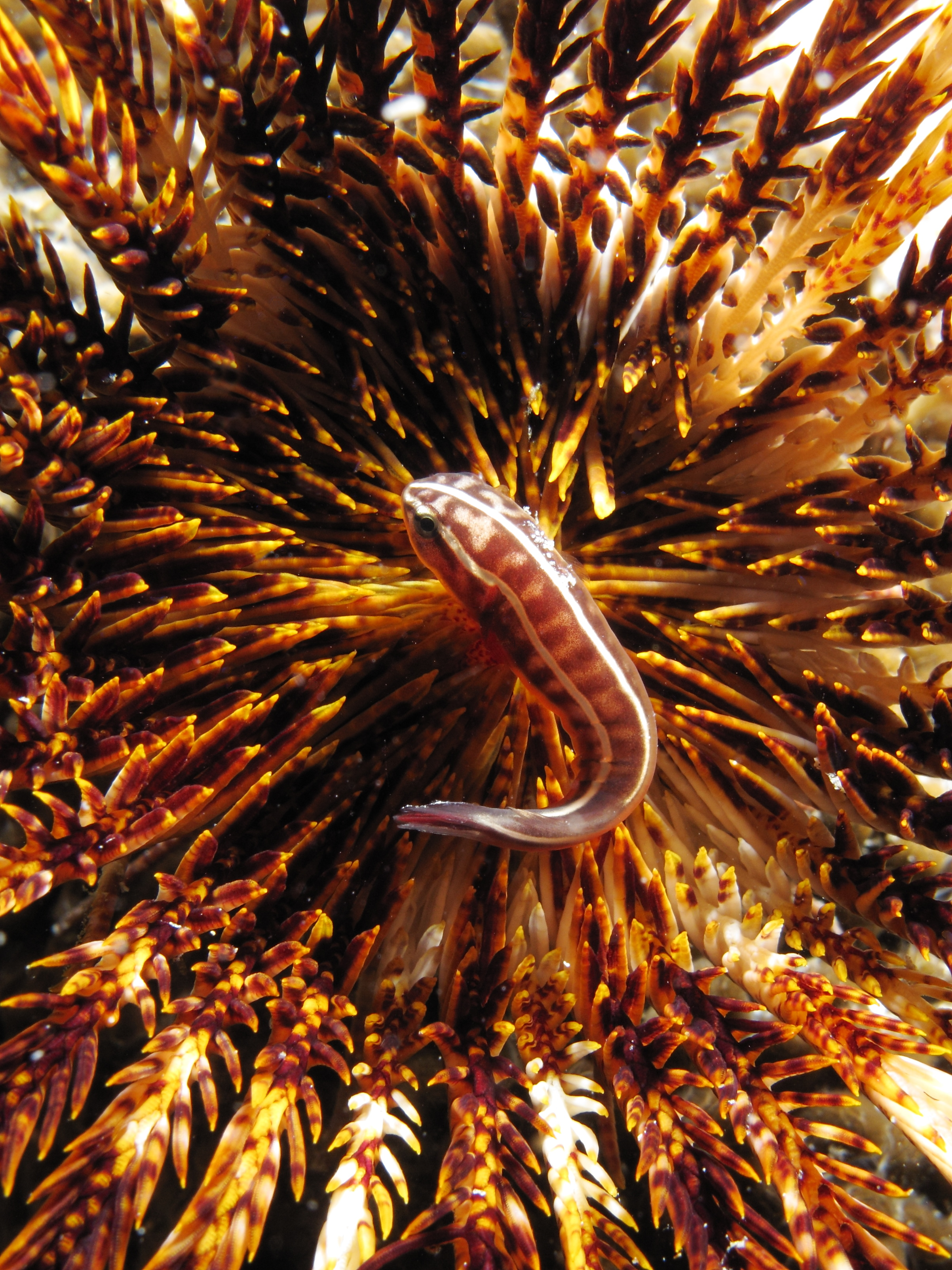

Conservation status
- Least Concern (IUCN 3.1)

Scientific classification
- Kingdom: Animalia
- Phylum: Chordata
- Class: Actinopterygii
- Order: Blenniiformes
- Family: Gobiesocidae
- Genus: Rhinolepadichthys
- Species: R. lineatus

Binomial name
- Rhinolepadichthys lineatus (Briggs, 1966)

Synonyms
- Lepadichthys lineatus

= Rhinolepadichthys lineatus =

Species of fish

Rhinolepadichthys lineatus, also known as the twoline clingfish, doubleline clingfish or doublestripe feather star clingfish, is a small clingfish (up to 45 mm (1.8 in) in length) which lives among the arms of crinoids. This species has an Indo-Pacific distribution from the Red Sea to Fiji, however, this is scattered rather than continuous and it has been recorded off Israel, Oman, the Seychelles, Sri Lanka and Yemen.
