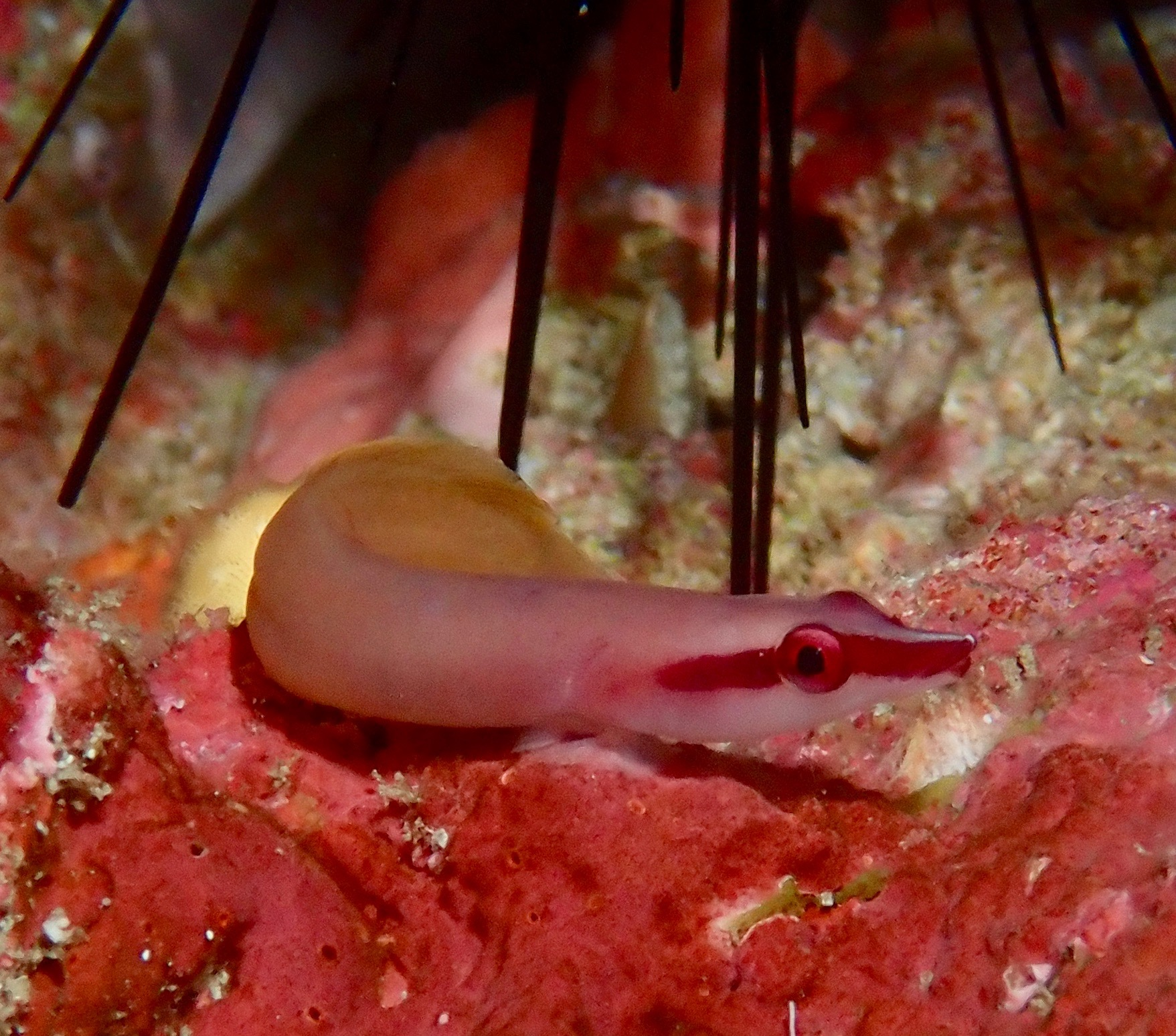
- Lepadichthys frenatus

Scientific classification
- Kingdom: Animalia
- Phylum: Chordata
- Class: Actinopterygii
- Order: Blenniiformes
- Family: Gobiesocidae
- Subfamily: Diademichthyinae
- Genus: Lepadichthys; Waite, 1904

Type species
- Lepadichthys frenatus Waite, 1904

Species
- see text

= Lepadichthys =

Genus of fishes

Lepadichthys is a genus of clingfishes native to the Indian and Pacific Oceans.

== Species ==
The former L. lineatus species group was moved to Rhinolepadichthys in 2024, so there are currently 9 recognized species in this genus:

- Lepadichthys bilineatus M. T. Craig, Bogorodsky & J. E. Randall, 2015
- Lepadichthys coccinotaenia Regan, 1921 - Eye-stripe clingfish
- Lepadichthys conwayi Fujiwara & Motomura, 2020
- Lepadichthys ctenion Briggs & Link, 1963
- Lepadichthys erythraeus Briggs & Link, 1963
- Lepadichthys frenatus Waite, 1904 - Bridled clingfish
- Lepadichthys misakius (Tanaka, 1908)
- Lepadichthys sandaracatus Whitley, 1943 - Shark Bay clingfish
- Lepadichthys springeri Briggs, 2001 - Springer's clingfish
