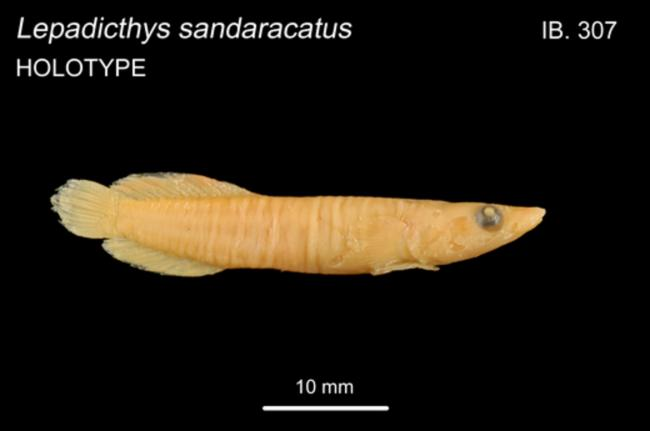

Scientific classification
- Kingdom: Animalia
- Phylum: Chordata
- Class: Actinopterygii
- Order: Blenniiformes
- Family: Gobiesocidae
- Genus: Lepadichthys
- Species: L. sandaracatus

Binomial name
- Lepadichthys sandaracatus Whitley, 1943

= Lepadichthys sandaracatus =

Species of fish

Lepadichthys sandaracatus, the Shark Bay clingfish, is a species of clingfish from the family Gobiesocidae. This species is endemic to Western Australia. This species was described in 1943 by Gilbert Percy Whitley with a type locality of Useless Inlet in Shark Bay, Western Australia.
