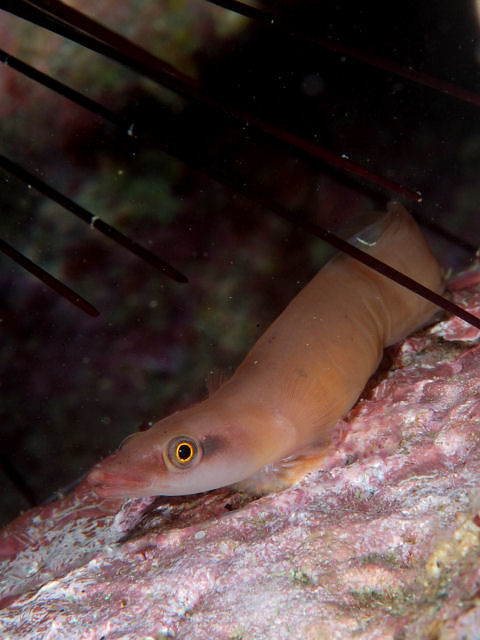

Conservation status
- Least Concern (IUCN 3.1)

Scientific classification
- Kingdom: Animalia
- Phylum: Chordata
- Class: Actinopterygii
- Order: Blenniiformes
- Family: Gobiesocidae
- Genus: Lepadichthys
- Species: L. frenatus

Binomial name
- Lepadichthys frenatus Waite, 1904

= Lepadichthys frenatus =

Species of fish

Lepadichthys frenatus, the bridled clingfish, is a species of clingfish from the family Gobiesocidae. It is found on shallow reefs in the western Pacific Ocean.

== Description ==
Lepadichthys frenatus is pale pinkish to orange in colour and has a dark reddish stripe which runs from the snout through the eye and across the cover of the gills. It has 15-17 soft rays in its dorsal fin and 12-15 in its anal fin. The dorsal, anal and caudal fins are all joined to each other. Compared to other clingfishes the sucker disc is medium in size and this species grows to a Total Length of 4.9 to 5.8 centimetres (1.9 to 2.3 in).

== Distribution ==
Lepadichthys frenatus occurs in the western Pacific Ocean from Japan to Australia, east to the Pitcairn Islands. In Australia it is found from the southern Great Barrier Reef to South Solitary Island, New South Wales as well as on Elizabeth Reef, Middleton Reef, Lord Howe Island and Norfolk Island.

== Habitat & biology ==
Lepadichthys frenatus occurs in coral and rocky reefs, where it frequently shelters at the base of sea urchins belonging to the species Diadema setosum. It is found at depths of 1 to 6 metres (3.3 to 19.7 ft). The male and female form a distinct pair for breeding and the female lays a brood of eggs.

== Taxonomy & etymology ==
Lepadichthys frenatus was described in 1904 by Edgar Ravenswood Waite with a type locality of Lord Howe Island. It is the type species of the genus Lepadichthys. The generic name is a reference to the related genus Lepadogaster with Lepadofrom that generic name added to ichthys, which is Greek for "fish". The specific name frenatus means "bridled" a presumed to be a reference to the stripe through the eye.
