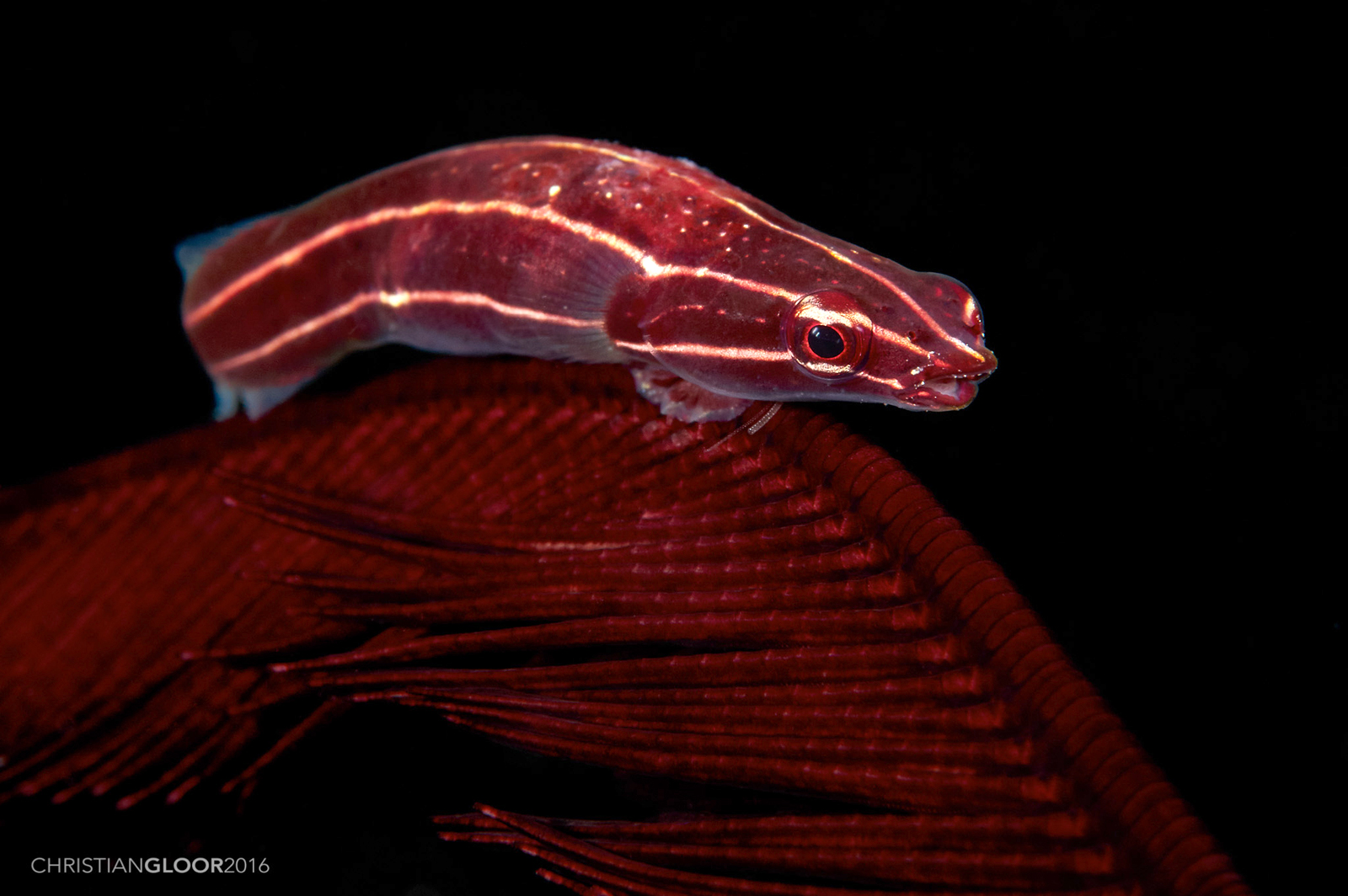
- Rhinolepadichthys lineatus

Scientific classification
- Kingdom: Animalia
- Phylum: Chordata
- Class: Actinopterygii
- Order: Blenniiformes
- Family: Gobiesocidae
- Subfamily: Diademichthyinae
- Genus: Rhinolepadichthys; Fujiwara, Motomura, Summers & Conway, 2024

Type species
- Lepadichthys polyastrous Fujiwara & Motomura, 2021

Species
- see text

= Rhinolepadichthys =

Genus of fishes

Rhinolepadichthys is a genus of clingfishes native to the Indian and Pacific Oceans. formerly classified within the genus Lepadichthys, as the L. lineatus species complex. It was officially recognized as a distinct genus in 2024. These marine, reef-associated fish typically live commensally on crinoids (feather stars) at depths of 8–25 metres (30–80 ft). They are characterized by a single adhesive disc and a hardened, often keratinized, cap on their disc papillae.

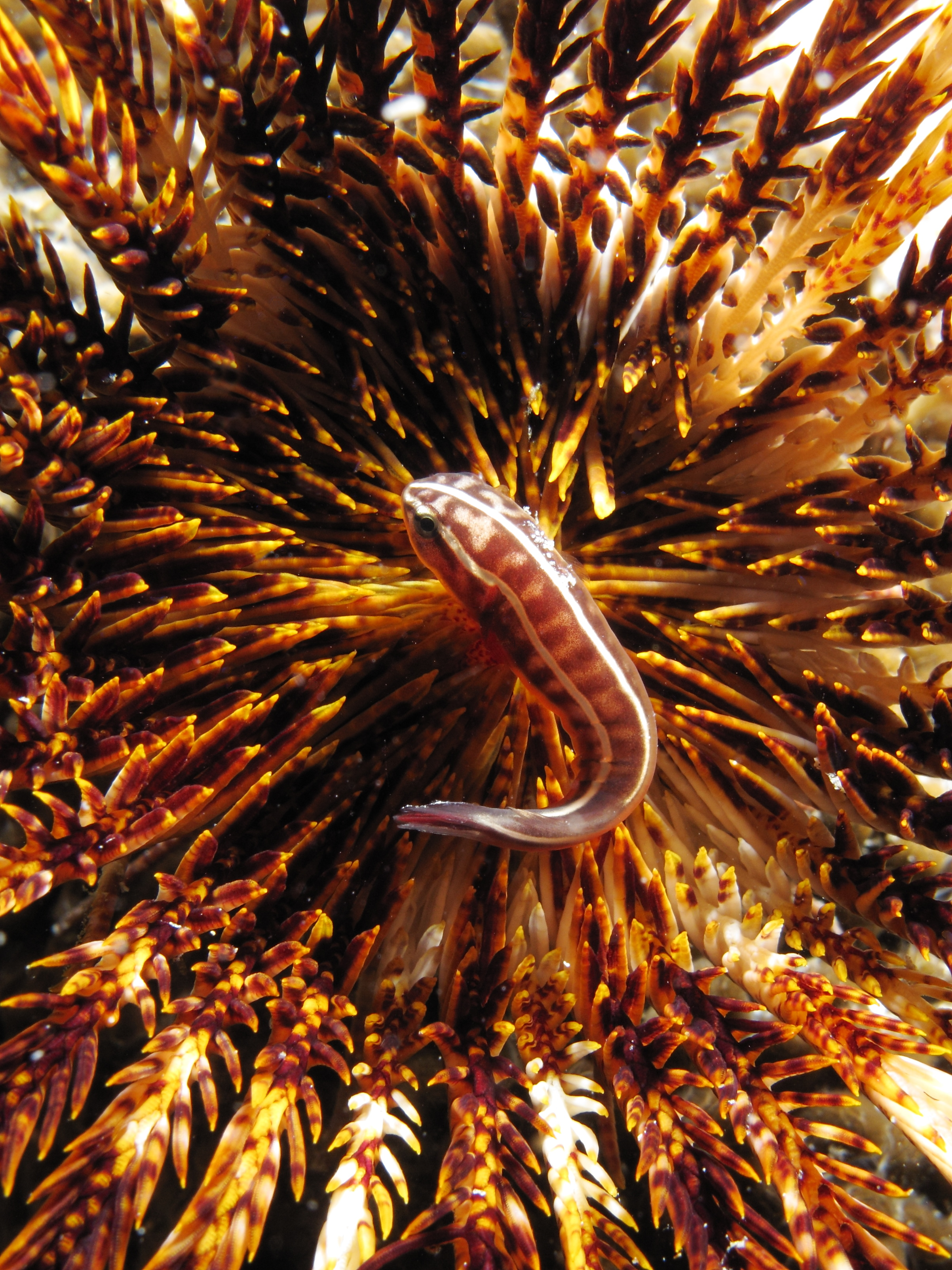
R. lineatus on its host crinoid

== Species ==
There are currently 4 recognized species in this genus:

- Rhinolepadichthys geminus (Fujiwara & Motomura, 2021) - Pacific double-line clingfish
- Rhinolepadichthys heemstraorum (Fujiwara & Motomura, 2021) - Heemstra's clingfish
- Rhinolepadichthys lineatus (Briggs, 1966) - Double-line clingfish
- Rhinolepadichthys polyastrous (Fujiwara & Motomura, 2021) - Starry clingfish
