= Dennis M. Jones =

American businessman

Dennis M. Jones (September 12, 1938 – September 20, 2016) was an American businessman. He is the founder of Jones Pharma and the Dennis M. Jones Family Foundation.

== Early life and education ==
Jones was born in Terre Haute, Indiana, in 1938, the son of a farm equipment dealer and a registered nurse. The family moved to Marshall, Illinois when he was a young boy.

After graduating from high school in 1956, he worked for a year at Ford Motor Company in Chicago Heights, Illinois, and then enlisted in the U.S. Marine Corps.

In 1958, he married Judy Pearce.

Upon his return to the U.S. in 1961, he worked for Rockford Life Insurance Company, where he stayed for three years. During that time, he met Jim O’Neal who hired him in sales for his pharmaceutical company, Sig: Laboratories. After a few years, O’Neal sold the company to a subsidiary of Revlon. O’Neal and Jones formed OJF Pharmaceutical Sales company, which in 1978, was acquired by Chromalloy American Corporation.

== Jones Pharma ==
Dennis and Judy Jones gathered their entire savings, $100,000, along with an additional $200,000 from friends, and founded Jones Medical, later renamed Jones Pharma, on March 16, 1981. Jones created it as a specialty pharmaceutical group that promoted niche products.

In the beginning, Jones Pharma consisted of Dennis and Judy Jones and one other employee. Within two years, two of his brothers joined, and the company began making acquisitions. At its pinnacle, Jones Pharma employed 600 people in five plants located in Phoenix, Arizona; St. Petersburg, Florida; Canton, Ohio; Madison, Wisconsin; and St. Louis, Missouri.

By 1999, they had made 19 acquisitions. Jones acquired a product named Thrombin USP, a hemostat that acts as a clotting agent in surgery, and saw numerous sales from it. The company completed its initial public offering in 1986, trading under the ticker symbol JMED on the NASDAQ. For a decade in the 1990s, with Dennis as the Chairman and CEO.

In the summer of 2000, the Joneses decided to sell the company to King Pharmaceuticals for $3.4 billion.

== Post business life ==
After selling Jones Pharma, the Joneses retired in Ladue, a suburban St. Louis community. In 2014, Dennis and Judy Jones ordered the construction of a $34 million, 164 ft. motor yacht – D’Natalin IV – by U.S. yacht builder, Christiansen Yachts. Jones died in St. Louis, Missouri on September 20, 2016.

== Philanthropy ==
The Dennis M. Jones Family Foundation is a St. Louis, Missouri-based foundation with a mission to support initiatives which empower individuals to succeed in life, with a focus on providing scholarships to underprivileged students. It was founded in 2000, and since then, more than $35 million has been contributed to charitable causes including civic organizations, education, Marines & Veterans, fighting homelessness, fighting poverty, and many others.

The largest cumulative donations include $4.8 million to Connections to Success, which helps ex-offenders develop job skills and land interviews, $3.8 million to Junior Achievement, $2.5 million to the St. Louis College of Pharmacy, $2.2 million to Forest Park Forever, and $2.0 million to the St. Louis Zoo.

== Recognition ==
Dennis Jones has been recognized throughout his life for achievements in business and civic involvement. Some of these awards include:

- EY Entrepreneur of the Year (2006) which recognizes the endeavors of exceptional men and women who create the products and services that keep the worldwide economy moving forward
- Variety the Children's Charity of St. Louis Man of the Year (2004) which recognizes St. Louis philanthropists who play an active role in shaping the local community
- Junior Achievement St. Louis Business Hall of Fame Laureate which highlights the lives of St. Louis businessmen and women, who through their success in business and life have made St. Louis an outstanding community.
- Jones Pharma recognized as one of best performing stocks of the decade of the 1990s - Los Angeles Times.
- Dennis Jones rang the closing bell at the New York Stock Exchange on August 30, 2000.

== Other sources ==
- Socha, Rudy & Darrow, Carolyn (2003). "Above and Beyond: Former Marines Conquer the Civilian World", p. 110. Turner Publishing, Paducha. ISBN 1-56311-949-8
- King Pharmaceuticals merging with Jones Pharma in $3.4 Billion Deal
- St. Louis Business Journal: He’s a multimillionaire who never went to college, yet within 20 years built Jones Pharma into a business that was acquired for $3.4 billion
- New York Times: Seeing a Supersize Yacht as a Job Engine, Not a Self-Indulgence
- Wall Street Journal: Vonnegut: When It's Time to Discuss Charity
