= United Coal Company =

American coal company based in Tennessee

- Industry: Coal mining
- Founded: 1970
- Headquarters: Johnson City, Tennessee, United States
- Key people: John Schroder (President & CEO)
- Parent: Metinvest
- Website: www.unitedcoal.com

United Coal Company (UCC), a coal mining company headquartered in Blountville, Tennessee, is a producer of high grade metallurgical coals. It has operations in Virginia, West Virginia, Kentucky, and Tennessee.

== History ==
=== Foundation ===
In 1970, Jim McGlothlin (a legal resident of Naples, Florida), along with his father Woodrow W. McGlothlin (who started the Diamond Smokeless Coal Co. in the mid-1950s) and five other investors, founded United Coal Company in Grundy, Virginia. McGlothlin first sold UCC in 1997 and later repurchased the company in 2004. The McGlothlins also founded The McGlothlin Foundation, which funds a variety of education-related causes in Southwest Virginia and The United Company Charitable Foundation.

=== Ownership changes ===
In 2006, former King Pharmaceuticals executives John M. Gregory and Joseph "Joe" Gregory invested in the company. The Gregory brothers are its first investors outside the McGlothlin family.

During April, 2009 Ukrainian business group Metinvest, controlled by Rinat Akhmetov, purchased the company for an estimated $1 billion. In August 2009, United Coal Company moved into its new corporate headquarters at 110 Sprint Drive in Blountville, Tennessee. A staff of thirty four employees work out of the Blountville UCC office, which combines all corporate activities and executives in one location, including legal counsel, risk management, accounting, purchasing, information technology, human resources and sales – departments previously located in Teays Valley, West Virginia, and Bristol, Virginia.

=== Holdings ===
- Carter Roag Coal Company
- Sapphire Coal Company
- Pocahontas Coal Company
- Wellmore Coal Company

== See also ==
- Fischer–Tropsch process
- Massey Energy
- Mountain Party
- Mountaintop removal mining
- United Mine Workers
