= AquAdvantage salmon =

Genetically modified Atlantic salmon

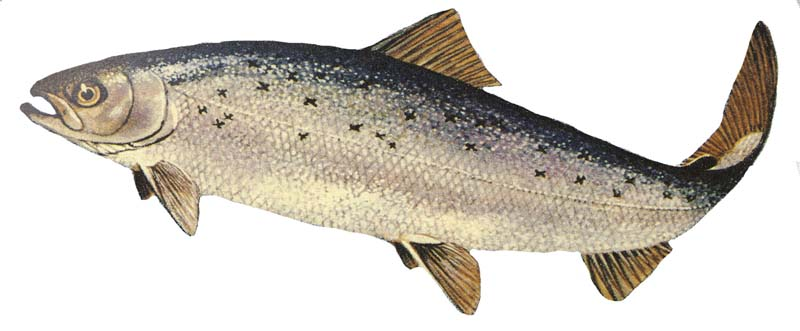
Wild-type Atlantic salmon (Salmo salar)

AquAdvantage salmon is a genetically engineered (GE) fish, a GE Atlantic salmon developed by AquaBounty Technologies in 1989. The typical growth hormone-regulating gene in the Atlantic salmon was replaced with the growth hormone-regulating gene from Pacific Chinook salmon, with a promoter sequence from ocean pout. This gene enables GM salmon to grow year-round instead of only during spring and summer.

These GE salmon are a commercially competitive alternative to wild-caught salmon and to fish farming of unmodified salmon. The purpose of the modifications is to increase the speed at which the fish grows without affecting its ultimate size or other qualities. Fish-farmed Atlantic salmon growth rates have already been improved over wild fish as a result of traditional selective breeding practices. However, GM fish are able to grow even faster and grow to market size in just 16 to 18 months rather than three years.

== Significance ==
AquAdvantage salmon were the first genetically engineered animals approved for human consumption in the United States and Canada. This approval has been subject to much controversy.

== Genetic Modification ==
The AquAdvantage salmon was developed in 1989 by the addition of a single copy of the opAFP-GHc2 construct, which consists of a promoter sequence from ocean pout directing the production of a growth hormone protein using the coding sequence from Chinook salmon. The continuous expression of this transgene allows the fish to grow all year-round instead of only during spring and summer. The stability of the new DNA construct was tested, revealing no additional mutational effects during insertion other than the two desired genes. These GM fish were back-crossed (a two-generation breeding protocol that starts by generating a hybrid offspring between two inbred strains, one of them carrying the mutation of interest) to wild-type Atlantic salmon, and the genetically modified EO-1ɑ gene sequence was identical in the second through fourth generations, indicating that the insertion is stable.

While wild Atlantic salmon (Salmo salar) have two sets of chromosomes, raised AquaAdvantage salmon have three sets (i.e. triploid). Induction of triploidy by treatment of eggs renders the fish sterile, reducing the risk of interbreeding with wild-type fish if any of the genetically modified fish were introduced into the wild. The inserted growth hormone gene is placed under control of a promoter sequence derived from the antifreeze protein of the ocean pout (Macrozoarces americanus). This promoter enables sustained growth hormone expression throughout the year, rather than the seasonal expression observed in wild salmon.

== Concerns ==
There are three main concerns regarding the approval of genetically engineered (GE) salmon: the consumption of these fish could be harmful, there may be unintended consequences of the gene alteration, and non-sterile fish could escape and interbreed with the wild population. Risk assessments have been conducted to determine the health and safety of this technology, and several preventative measures have been implemented to prevent the release of these fish into the wild.

=== Human health risk assessment ===
Fish are one of the eight food types that the Food and Drug Administration (FDA) is required, by law, to treat with special care, with regard to allergies. As part of the regulatory process, the FDA required data on whether changes occur in the kinds or levels of fish allergens (such as parvalbumin) in AquAdvantage. The FDA has upheld that people with allergies to Atlantic Salmon will likely be allergic to AquAdvantage Salmon due to the similar species properties, but not because it is genetically engineered and that AquAdvantage Salmon is as safe to eat as non-GE salmon because there are no significant food safety hazards associated with AquAdvantage. Other human health concerns arise due to the increased hormone content in the edible tissue of transgenic fish. The AquAdvantage salmon showed a statistical difference in the concentration of an insulin-like growth factor, yet the amount of (IGF-1) found in AquAdvantage salmon is similar to, or lower than, other amounts found in other common animal products such as organic cow milk.

=== Off-target effects of gene editing ===
A concern with genetic engineering is that another gene other than the one intended may also be accidentally edited. The genome sequence of the AquAdvantage salmon has been analyzed and no off-target effects or changes in other genes have been detected.

=== Precautionary containment procedures ===
Critics raised concerns about potential environmental impacts if these fish reached the rivers or oceans. Modeled invasion scenarios in semi-natural environments suggest that GM salmon would out-compete wild-type salmon. To address concerns about biological containment, the FDA requires AquaBounty to take precautionary measures to ensure that transgenic fish do not mix with the wild population. Aquaculture that uses conventionally bred salmon, mostly Atlantic salmon, cultivates the fish in net pens. In North America, this occurs mostly in coastal waters off Washington, British Columbia, and Maine. However, the application for FDA approval of AquAdvantage salmon specified land-based tank cultivation with no ocean involvement. AquaBounty also altered the fish to be only female and sterile. Male fish are created only for egg-producing service and are kept in secure, land-based facilities in Canada. These eggs are then shipped to a land-based aquaculture facility in Indiana.

In order to make the fish sterile AquAdvantage salmon eggs are treated with pressure, to create batches of fish eggs with three copies of each chromosome (triploid) rather than two copies (diploid). Any batch that contains 5 percent or more diploid fish, is destroyed because these diploid fish are capable of reproducing.

== Government regulation ==
=== United States ===
In September 2010, an FDA advisory panel indicated that the fish is "highly unlikely to cause any significant effects on the environment" and that it is "as safe as food from conventional Atlantic salmon". In October 2010, 39 lawmakers asked the FDA to reject the application. Other groups requested that the fish carry a label identifying its transgenic origin. Concerns included alleged flaws in sterilization and isolation, and excessive antibiotic use.

On 25 December 2012, the FDA published a draft environmental assessment for AquAdvantage salmon. The FDA also published a preliminary Finding of No Significant Impact. A 60-day period for the public to comment was to elapse before the FDA reviewed Aquadvantage salmon again, which was arbitrarily extended until May 2013.

The FDA approved AquaBounty Technologies' application to sell the AquAdvantage salmon to U.S. consumers on November 19, 2015. However, a rider to a spending bill signed into law on December 18, 2015, by President Obama bans its import until the FDA mandates labels for the genetically modified product. The decision marks the first time a genetically modified animal has been approved to enter the United States food supply. The decision came nearly twenty years after the company first submitted data to the FDA, and after they had raised ten generations of the animals. The announcement released by the FDA states: "AquAdvantage salmon is as safe to eat as any non-genetically engineered (GE) Atlantic salmon, and also as nutritious." One month later, language was introduced into a proposed federal spending bill requiring consumer notification that the fish is genetically modified. In October, 2018, AquaAdvantage salmon was not being sold in the US and the import of the salmon eggs from Canada to be raised at an AquaAdvantage fish farm in Indiana was prohibited by FDA. However, on March 8, 2019, the import alert issued previously by the FDA was deactivated, and AquAdvantage salmon may now be sold in the U.S. and the salmon eggs may now be imported to the Indiana facility.

On November 5, 2020, the United States District Court for the Northern District of California granted a motion to force the FDA to reconsider its approval of AquAdvantage, holding that the FDA had failed to follow its own procedures by ignoring some environmental consequences of these fish. Sales in the U.S. started in May 2021.

In December 2024, CEO Dave Melbourne resigned from the company. Days later, the company announced it would wind down operations at its Bay Fortune site, its last operating farm. Interim CEO David Frank said the company did not have sufficient liquidity to maintain operations at the facility.

=== Canada ===
On 25 November 2013, Environment Canada approved the product for salmon egg production for commercial purposes in Canada. In May 2016, the Canadian Food Inspection Agency approved the sale of the GM fish. In July 2017, AquaBounty Technologies said they had sold 4.5 tons of AquaAdvantage salmon fillets to customers in Canada.
