= Randal J. Kirk =

American lawyer (born 1954)

- Born: March 1, 1954 (age 72); Pleasanton, California, U.S.
- Education: Radford University (BA,); University of Virginia School of Law (JD)
- Occupations: Biotech investor; CEO of Intrexon Corporation; founder and senior managing director of Third Security, LLC
- Known for: Biotech investing
- Political party: Independent
- Board member of: Intrexon Corporation (since 2008); Halozyme Therapeutics (since 2007)
- Children: 4

Randal J. Kirk (born March 1, 1954) is an American billionaire businessman and investor in pharmaceuticals and biotechnology. Kirk was the chairman and chief executive officer of Intrexon (NYSE: XON), a biotechnology company, until 2020. Kirk started as a lawyer, but is best known for his investments in pharmaceutical and biotech companies. In addition to high-profile sales of New River Pharmaceuticals, and Clinical Data, Kirk founded investment firm Third Security, and has held board seats with biotech companies, such as Scios. As of May 2024, Forbes estimated his net worth at US$1.4 billion.

== Early life and education ==
Randal J. Kirk was born in Pleasanton, California. The son of a U.S. Air Force master sergeant, Kirk and his family moved from California to Texas before settling in Virginia and Florida. Kirk graduated from Pulaski High School in Pulaski County, Virginia. Following high school, Kirk worked selling cars and motorcycles, and enrolled part-time at Radford University to study business. He earned a bachelor's degree in Economics at Radford in 1976, followed by a Juris Doctor at the University of Virginia in 1979.

== Career ==
Kirk was admitted to the bar in 1980, becoming the only attorney in Bland, Virginia, and began a practice he ran until 1990. In 1983, he partnered with Bland County pharmacist John Gregory to found the next-day pharmaceutical distributor General Injectables and Vaccines. Kirk and his partners would go on to sell the business to Henry Schein, Inc. for $65 million in 1998.

In 1996, Kirk founded New River Pharmaceuticals, where he was chairman and CEO and took the company public in 2004. The developer of attention-deficit drug Vyvanse, New River would prove to be Kirk's single biggest payoff when he sold the company to Shire in 2007 for $2.6 billion, making over a $1 billion for Kirk himself.

In 1999, Kirk founded the life-sciences investment firm Third Security, LLC, where he is senior managing director, CEO and chairman. From 2000 to 2002, Kirk was a member of the board of directors for Scios, Inc., a maker of heart disease medication that later sold to Johnson & Johnson for $2.4 billion. Kirk also became the majority stock holder and chairman of Newton, Massachusetts-based pharmaceutical company Clinical Data, Inc. In 2011, shortly after Clinical Data's drug Viibryd received regulatory approval, Forest Laboratories bought Clinical Data for $1.2 billion.

Kirk became involved with biotechnology company Intrexon in the 2000s. He was named chairman of its board in 2008 and became CEO in 2009. Kirk took Intrexon public in 2013, taking the company's market cap to $2.5 billion with the IPO. In early 2020, Intrexon adopted the name of its subsidiary, Precigen, and narrowed its focus to human gene editing. With the change in name the CEO of subsidiary Precigen, Helen Sabzevari, took over leadership of the company from Kirk.

Intrexon sold AquaBounty to TS Aquaculture, LLC, a privately held company managed by Third Security, LLC, a venture capital firm led by former Intrexon Chairman & CEO Randal Kirk. In addition to AquaBounty's development of genetically modified salmon, Kirk is involved in other companies advocating the approval of genetic engineering, including disease-resistant mosquitoes and an apple which resists browning. Other projects of Kirk's companies include creating cancer treatments, gasoline substitutes, crop protection, and improving bovine genetics.

== Recognition ==
Kirk has been profiled by SynBioBeta and Forbes. In 2008, Virginia Gov. Tim Kaine named Kirk Virginia's Outstanding Industrialist for the Year. He has spoken at the SynBioBeta Conference, BioFlorida, Klick Ideas Exchange and was a Borlaug Dialogue Speaker at the World Food Prize.

== Philanthropy and other roles ==
Following the sale of General Injectables and Vaccines, Kirk donated $1 million to Radford University, creating the Zylphia Shu-En Kirk Endowment named after his daughter. Kirk has been on the board of directors of the Radford University Foundation and the school's board of visitors. Kirk was a member of University of Virginia's board of visitors from 2009 to 2012.

Kirk has also donated substantially to political causes. He considers himself a political independent, and has supported both Republicans and Democrats. He has been especially involved in Virginia politics, donating $1.8 million to candidates for state office, including $200,000 to Terry McAuliffe's 2009 Virginia gubernatorial election.

== Personal life ==
Kirk lives in West Palm Beach, Florida and has four children. According to Forbes, Kirk is worth $2.0 billion and ranks No. 1135 on its billionaires list. Kirk's hobbies include falconry.
