= Genetically modified fish =

Fish with DNA altered by genetic engineering

Genetically modified fish (GM fish) are organisms from the taxonomic clade which includes the classes Agnatha (jawless fish), Chondrichthyes (cartilaginous fish) and Osteichthyes (bony fish) whose genetic material (DNA) has been altered using genetic engineering techniques. In most cases, the aim is to introduce a new trait to the fish which does not occur naturally in the species, i.e. transgenesis.

GM fish are used in scientific research and kept as pets. They are being developed as environmental pollutant sentinels and for use in aquaculture food production. In 2015, the AquAdvantage salmon was approved by the US Food and Drug Administration (FDA) for commercial production, sale and consumption, making it the first genetically modified animal to be approved for human consumption. Some GM fish that have been created have promoters driving an over-production of "all fish" growth hormone. This results in dramatic growth enhancement in several species, including salmonids, carps and tilapias.

Critics have objected to GM fish on several grounds, including ecological concerns, animal welfare concerns and with respect to whether using them as food is safe and whether GM fish are needed to help address the world's food needs.

== History and process ==
The first transgenic fish were produced in China in 1985. As of 2013, approximately 50 species of fish have been subject to genetic modification. This has resulted in more than 400 fish/trait combinations. Most of the modifications have been conducted on food species, such as Atlantic salmon (Salmo salar), tilapia (genus) and common carp (Cyprinus carpio).

Generally, genetic modification entails manipulation of DNA. The process is known as cisgenesis when a gene is transferred between organisms that could be conventionally bred, or transgenesis when a gene from one species is added to a different species. Gene transfer into the genome of the desired organism, as for fish in this case, requires a vector like a lentivirus or mechanical/physical insertion of the altered genes into the nucleus of the host by means of a micro syringe or a gene gun.

== Uses ==
=== Research ===
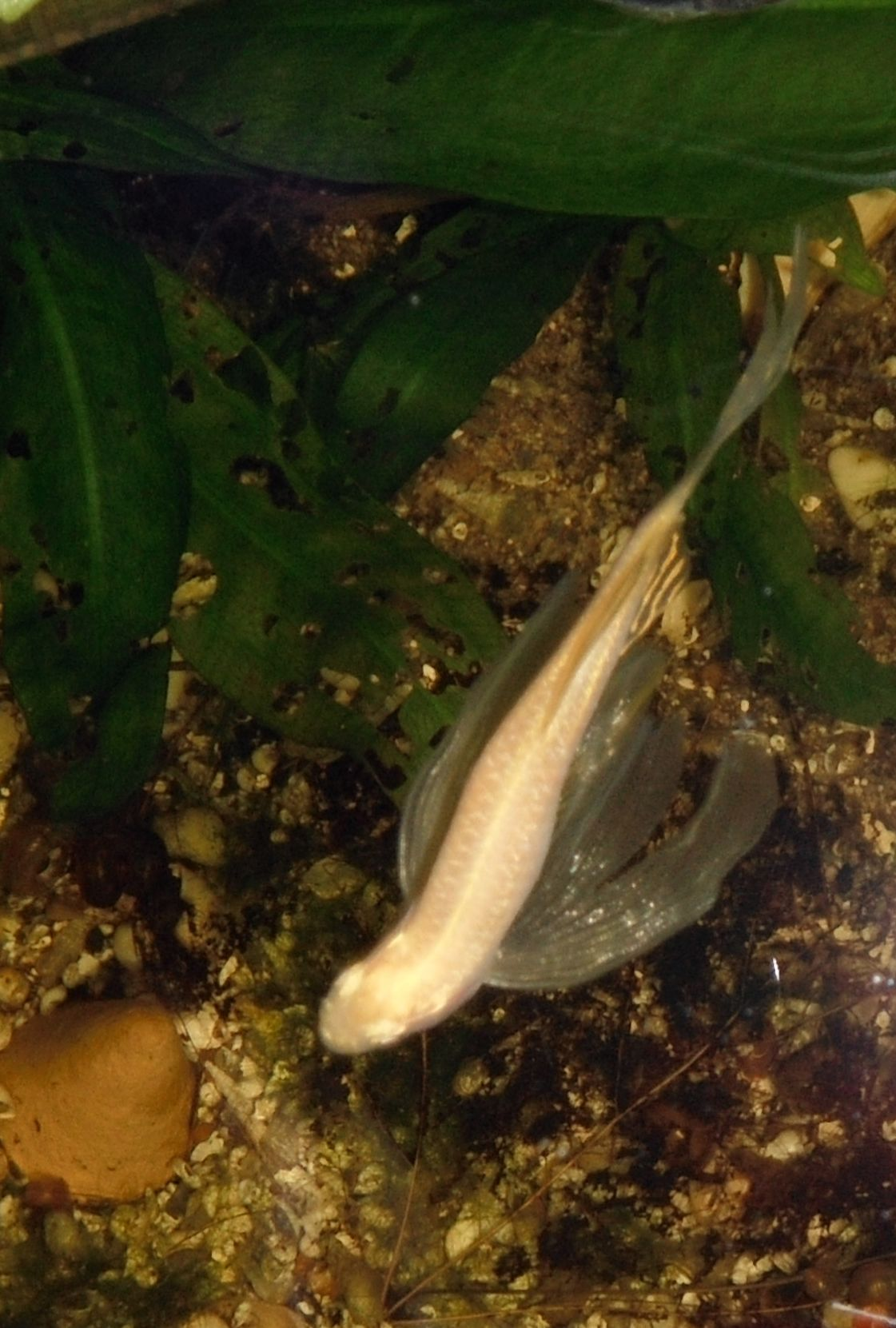
Zebrafish genetically modified to have long fins

Transgenic fish are used in research covering five broad areas

- Enhancing the traits of commercially available fish
- Their use as bioreactors for the development of bio-medically important proteins
- Their use as indicators of aquatic pollutants
- Developing new non-mammalian animal models
- Functional genomics studies

Most GM fish are used in basic research in genetics and development. Two species of fish, zebrafish (Danio rerio) and medaka (Japanese rice fish, Oryzias latipes), are most commonly modified because they have optically clear chorions (shells), develop rapidly, the 1-cell embryo is easy to see and micro-inject with transgenic DNA, and zebrafish have the capability of regenerating their organ tissues. They are also used in drug discovery. GM zebrafish are being explored for benefits of unlocking human organ tissue diseases and failure mysteries. For instance, zebrafish are used to understand heart tissue repair and regeneration in efforts to study and discover cures for cardiovascular diseases.

Transgenic rainbow trout (Oncorhynchus mykiss) have been developed to study muscle development. The introduced transgene causes green fluorescence to appear in fast twitch muscle fibres early in development which persist throughout life. It has been suggested the fish might be used as indicators of aquatic pollutants or other factors which influence development.

In intensive fish farming, the fish are kept at high stocking densities. This means they suffer from frequent transmission of contagious diseases, a problem which is being addressed by GM research. Grass carp (Ctenopharyngodon idella) have been modified with a transgene coding for human lactoferrin, which doubles their survival rate relative to control fish after exposure to Aeromonas bacteria and Grass carp hemorrhage virus. Cecropin has been used in channel catfish to enhance their protection against several pathogenic bacteria by 2–4 times.

=== Recreation ===
==== Pets ====
GloFish is a patented technology which allows GM fish (tetra, barb, zebrafish) to express jellyfish and sea coral proteins giving the fish bright red, green or orange fluorescent colors when viewed in ultraviolet light. Although the fish were originally created and patented for scientific research at the National University of Singapore, a Texas company, Yorktown Technologies, obtained the rights to market the fish as pets. They became the first genetically modified animal to become publicly available as a pet when introduced for commercial in 2003. They were quickly banned for sale in California; however, they are now on shelves once again in this state. As of 2013, Glofish are only sold in the US.

Other transgenic lines of pet fish include Medaka which remain transparent throughout their lives and pink body color transgenic angelfish (Pterophyllum scalare) and lionhead fish expressing the Acropora coral (Acroporo millepora) red fluorescent protein.

The ocean pout type III antifreeze protein transgene has been successfully micro-injected and expressed in goldfish. The transgenic goldfish showed higher cold tolerance compared with controls.

=== Food ===
One area of intensive research with GM fish has aimed to increase food production by modifying the expression of growth hormone (GH). The relative increases in growth differ between species.^{(Figure 1)} They range from a doubling in weight, to some fish that are almost 100 times heavier than the wild-type at a comparable age. This research area has resulted in dramatic growth enhancement in several species, including salmon, trout and tilapia. Other sources indicate an 11-fold and 30-fold increase in growth of salmon and mud loach, respectively, compared to wild-type fish. Transgenic fish development has reached the stage where several species are ready to be marketed in different countries, for example, GM tilapia in Cuba, GM carp in the People's Republic of China, and GM salmon in the US and Canada. In 2014, it was reported that applications for the approval of transgenic fish as food had been made in Canada, China, Cuba and the United States.

Over-production of GH from the pituitary gland increases growth rate mainly by an increase in food consumption by the fish, but also by a 10 to 15% increase in feed conversion efficiency.

Another approach to increasing meat production in GM fish is "double muscling". This results in a phenotype similar to that of Belgian Blue cattle in rainbow trout. It is achieved by using transgenes expressing follistatin, which inhibits myostatin, and the development of two muscle layers.

==== AquAdvantage salmon ====
In November 2015, the FDA of the USA approved the AquAdvantage salmon created by AquaBounty for commercial production, sale and consumption. It is the first genetically modified animal to be approved for human consumption. The fish is essentially an Atlantic salmon with a single gene complex inserted: a growth hormone regulating gene from a Chinook salmon with a promoter sequence from an ocean pout. This permits the GM salmon to produce GH year round rather than pausing for part of the year as do wild-type Atlantic salmon. The wild-type salmon takes 24 to 30 months to reach market size (4–6 kg) whereas the GM salmon require 18 months for the GM fish to achieve this. AquaBounty argue that their GM salmon can be grown nearer to end-markets with greater efficiency (they require 25% less feed to achieve market weight) than the Atlantic salmon which are currently reared in remote coastal fish farms, thereby making it better for the environment, with recycled waste and lower transport costs.

To prevent the genetically modified fish inadvertently breeding with wild salmon, all the fish raised for food are females, triploid, and 99% are reproductively sterile. The fish are raised in a facility in Panama with physical barriers and geographical containment such as river and ocean temperatures too high to support salmon survival to prevent escape. The FDA has determined AquAdvantage would not have a significant effect on the environment in the United States. A fish farm is also being readied in Indiana where the FDA has approved importation of salmon eggs. As of August 2017, GMO salmon is being sold in Canada. Sales in the US began in May 2021. AquaBounty ended fish production in December 2024.

=== Detecting aquatic pollution (potential) ===
Several research groups have been developing GM zebrafish to detect aquatic pollution. The laboratory that developed the GloFish originally intended them to change color in the presence of pollutants, as environmental sentinels. Teams at the University of Cincinnati and Tulane University have been developing GM fish for the same purpose.

Several transgenic methods have been used to introduce target DNA into zebrafish for environmental monitoring, including micro-injection, electroporation, particle gun bombardment, liposome-mediated gene transfer, and sperm-mediated gene transfer. Micro-injection is the most commonly used method to produce transgenic zebrafish as this produces the highest survival rate.

== Regulation ==
The regulation of genetic engineering concerns the approaches taken by governments to assess and manage the risks associated with the development and release of genetically modified crops. There are differences in the regulation of GMOs between countries, with some of the most marked differences occurring between the US and Europe. Regulation varies in a given country depending on the intended use of the products of the genetic engineering. For example, a fish not intended for food use is generally not reviewed by authorities responsible for food safety.

The US FDA guidelines for evaluating transgenic animals define transgenic constructs as "drugs" regulated under the animal drug provisions of the Federal Food and Cosmetic Act. This classification is important for several reasons, including that it places all GM food animal permits under the jurisdiction of the FDA's Center for Veterinary Medicine (CVM) and imposes limits on what information the FDA can release to the public, and furthermore, it avoids a more open food safety review process.

The US states of Washington and Maine have imposed permanent bans on the production of transgenic fish.

== Controversy ==
Critics have objected to use of genetic engineering per se on several grounds, including ethical concerns, ecological concerns (especially about gene flow), and economic concerns raised by the fact GM techniques and GM organisms are subject to intellectual property law. GMOs also are involved in controversies over GM food with respect to whether using GM fish as food is safe, whether it would exacerbate or cause fish allergies, whether it should be labeled, and whether GM fish and crops are needed to address the world's food needs. These controversies have led to litigation, international trade disputes, and protests, and to restrictive regulation of commercial products in most countries.

There is much doubt among the public about genetically modified animals in general. It is believed that the acceptance of GM fish by the general public is the lowest of all GM animals used for food and pharmaceuticals.

=== Ethical concerns ===
In transgenic fast-growing fish genetically modified for growth hormone, the mosaic founder fish vary greatly in their growth rate, reflecting the highly variable proportion and distribution of transgenic cells in their bodies. Fish with these high growth rates (and their progeny) sometimes develop a morphological abnormality similar to acromegaly in humans, exhibiting an enlarged head relative to the body and a bulging operculum. This becomes progressively worse as the fish ages. It can interfere with feeding and may ultimately cause death. According to a study commissioned by Compassion in World Farming, the abnormalities are probably a direct consequence of growth hormone over-expression and have been reported in GM coho salmon, rainbow trout, common carp, channel catfish and loach, but to a lesser extent in Nile tilapia.

In GM coho salmon (Oncorhynchus kisutch) there are morphological changes and changed allometry that lead to reduced swimming abilities. They also exhibit abnormal behaviour such as increased levels of activity with respect to feed-intake and swimming. Several other transgenic fish show decreased swimming ability, likely due to body shape and muscle structure.

Genetically modified triploid fish are more susceptible to temperature stress, have a higher incidence of deformities (e.g. abnormalities in the eye and lower jaw), and are less aggressive than diploids. Other welfare concerns of GM fish include increased stress under oxygen-deprived conditions caused by increased need for oxygen. It has been shown that deaths due to low levels of oxygen (hypoxia) in coho salmon are most pronounced in transgenics. It has been suggested the increased sensitivity to hypoxia is caused by the insertion of the extra set of chromosomes requiring a larger nucleus which thereby causes a larger cell overall and a reduction in the surface area to volume ratio of the cell.

=== Ecological concerns ===
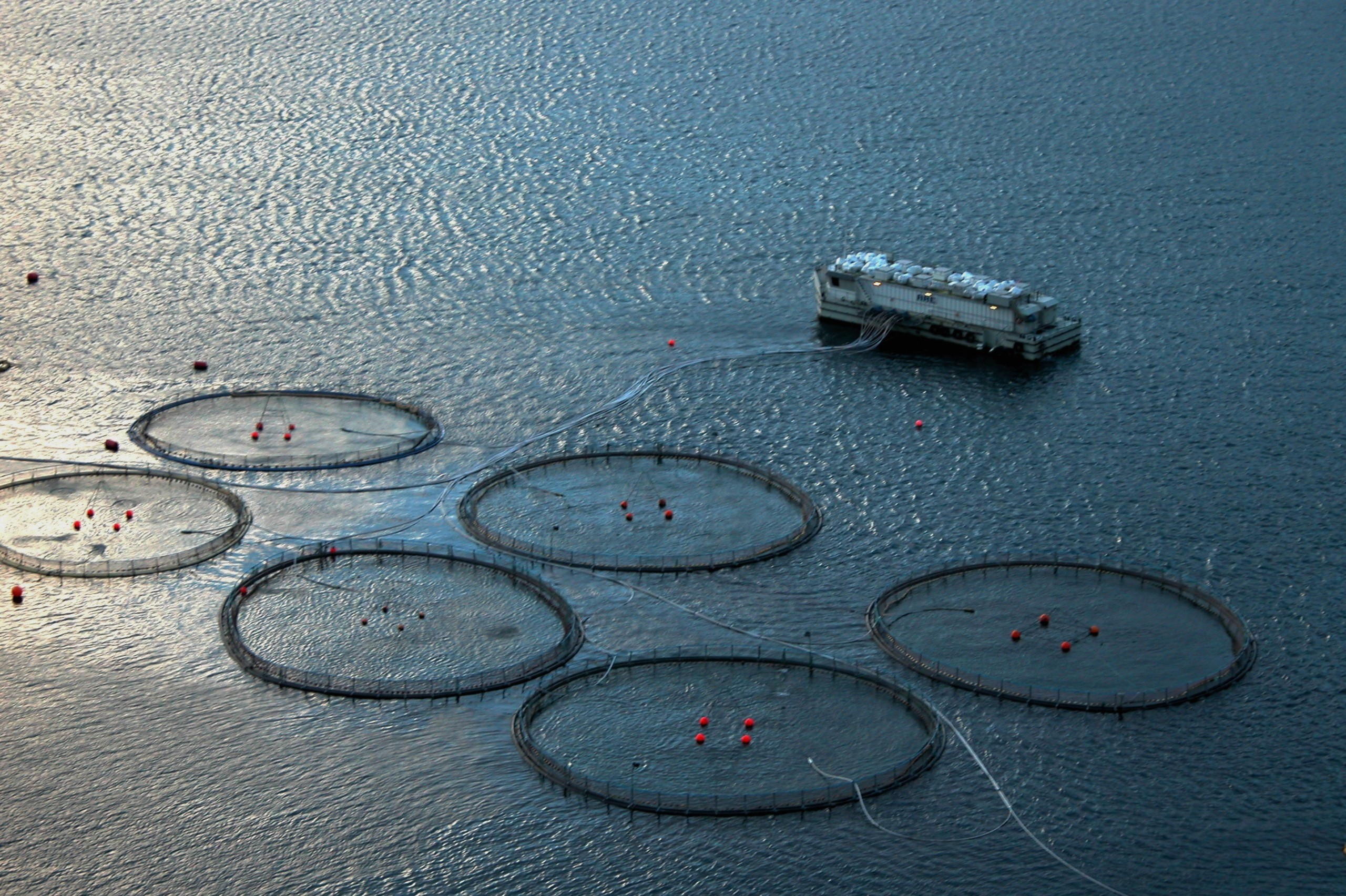
An aquaculture enterprise

Transgenic fish are usually developed in strains of near-wild origin. These have an excellent capacity for interbreeding with themselves or wild relatives and therefore possess a significant possibility for establishing themselves in nature should they escape biotic or abiotic containment measures.

A wide range of concerns about the consequences of genetically modified fish escaping have been expressed. For polyploids, these include the degree of sterility, interference with spawning, competing with resources without contributing to subsequent generations. For transgenics, the concerns include characteristics of the genotype, the function of the gene, the type of the gene, potential for causing pleiotropic effects, potential for interacting with the remainder of the genome, stability of the construct, ability of the DNA construct to transpose within or between genomes.

One study, using relevant life history data from the Japanese medaka (Oryzias latipes) predicts that a transgene introduced into a natural population by a small number of transgenic fish will spread as a result of enhanced mating advantage, but the reduced viability of offspring will cause eventual local extinction of both populations. GM coho salmon show greater risk-taking behaviour and better use of limited food than wild-type fish.

Transgenic coho salmon have enhanced feeding capacity and growth, which can result in a considerably larger body size (>7-fold) compared to non-transgenic salmon. When transgenic and non-transgenic salmon in the same enclosure compete for different levels of food, transgenic individuals consistently outgrow non-transgenic individuals. When food abundance is low, dominant individuals emerge, invariably transgenic, that show strong agonistic and cannibalistic behavior to cohorts and dominate the acquisition of limited food resources. When food availability is low, all groups containing transgenic salmon experience population crashes or complete extinctions, whereas groups containing only non-transgenic salmon have good (72%) survival rates. This has led to the suggestion that these GM fish will survive better than the wild-type when conditions are very poor.

Successful artificial transgenic hybridization between two species of loach (genus Misgurnus) has been reported, yet these species are not known to hybridize naturally.

GloFish were not considered as an environmental threat because they were less fit than normal zebrafish which are unable to establish themselves in the wild in the US.

==== AquAdvantage salmon ====
The FDA has said the AquAdvantage Salmon can be safely contained in land-based tanks with little risk of escape into the wild; however, Joe Perry, former chair of the GM panel of the European Food Safety Authority, has been quoted as saying "There remain legitimate ecological concerns over the possible consequences if these GM salmon escape to the wild and reproduce, despite FDA assurances over containment and sterility, neither of which can be guaranteed".

AquaBounty indicates their GM salmon can not interbreed with wild fish because they are triploid which makes them sterile. The possibility of fertile triploids is one of the major short-falls of triploidy being used as a means of bio-containment for transgenic fish. However, it is estimated that 1.1% of eggs remain diploid, and therefore capable of breeding, despite the triploidy process. Others have claimed the sterility process has a failure rate of 5%. With around a million fish in each of the 3,000 Atlantic sites a single failure could result in the release of 1,100 to 5,000 genetically altered fish capable of reproducing. Large scale trials using normal pressure, high pressure, or high pressure plus aged eggs for transgenic coho salmon, give triploidy frequencies of only 99.8%, 97.6%, and 97.0%, respectively. AquaBounty also emphasizes that their GM salmon would not survive wild conditions due to the geographical locations where their research is conducted, as well as the locations of their farms.

The GH transgene can be transmitted via hybridization of GM AquAdvantage Salmon and the closely related wild brown trout (Salmo trutta). Transgenic hybrids are viable and grow more rapidly than transgenic salmon and other wild-type crosses in conditions emulating a hatchery. In stream mesocosms designed to simulate natural conditions, transgenic hybrids express competitive dominance and suppress the growth of transgenic and non-transgenic salmon by 82% and 54%, respectively. Natural levels of hybridization between these two species can be as high as 41%. Researchers examining this possibility concluded "Ultimately, we suggest that hybridization of transgenic fishes with closely related species represents potential ecological risks for wild populations and a possible route for introgression of a transgene, however low the likelihood, into a new species in nature."

An article in Slate Magazine in December 2012 by Jon Entine, Director of the Genetic Literacy Project, criticized the Obama administration for preventing the publication of the environmental assessment (EA) of the AquAdvantage Salmon, which was completed in April 2012 and which concluded that "the salmon is safe to eat and poses no serious environmental hazards." The Slate article said that the publication of the report was stopped "after meetings with the White House, which was debating the political implications of approving the GM salmon, a move likely to infuriate a portion of its base". Within days of the article's publication and less than two months after the election, the FDA released the draft EA and opened the comment period.
