= Jones Pharma =

Jones Pharma is a specialty pharmaceuticals manufacturer and marketer based in St. Louis, Missouri. The company was founded on March 16, 1981, by Dennis M. Jones and Judith Pearce Jones under the name Jones Medical Industries. The company completed its initial public offering in 1986, trading under the ticker symbol JMED on the NASDAQ. The primary therapeutic compounds marketed by the company include Thrombin-JMI and Levoxyl. On May 30, 2000, the company became a wholly owned subsidiary of King Pharmaceuticals (NYSE:KG), based in Bristol, Tennessee. The market value of the company on its closing trade was $3.6 billion. Parent company King Pharmaceuticals was acquired by Pfizer in 2010.
