= AquaBounty Technologies =

American biotechnology company

AquaBounty Technologies Inc.
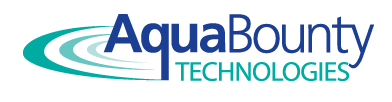
- Traded as: Nasdaq: AQB; Russell Microcap Index component
- Industry: Biotechnology; Aquaculture
- Founded: 1991
- Headquarters: Maynard, Massachusetts
- Key people: David Frank (Interim CEO)
- Parent: TS Aquaculture, LLC
- Website: aquabounty.com

AquaBounty Technologies is a biotechnology and aquaculture company based in Maynard, Massachusetts, United States. The company is notable for its research and development of genetically modified fish. It aims to create products that aim to increase the productivity of aquaculture. As of 2020, sale of the company's AquAdvantage salmon has been approved in Canada and the United States. The company sold all of its operating farms and ceased fish production in 2024.

== History ==
The underlying genetic technology that accelerates the growth and reduces the time to market for the AquAdvantage salmon was developed in 1989 at Memorial University in Newfoundland, Canada. In 2003, the first regulatory study of the fish was submitted in the U.S. to the Food and Drug Administration (FDA), who ruled that the fish were safe to eat and posed no threat to the environment when farmed in land-based aquaculture farms. In 2012, a submission was made to Health Canada to allow the sale of the genetically modified fish in Canada and the application was subsequently approved. AquAdvantage salmon received FDA approval in 2015 and the first U.S. harvest of salmon occurred in 2020 at their aquafarm in Albany, Indiana.

On April 20, 2022, construction began on a 479,000 sq ft (44,500 m^{2}) production facility in Pioneer, Ohio, which could produce over 22 million pounds of genetically engineered Atlantic salmon per year. The project was expected to cost $290–320 million.

On June 2, 2023, AquaBounty announced that construction of the Pioneer farm had been paused due to an unexpected increase in construction costs, bringing the new estimate to $375–395 million.

On November 7, 2023, AquaBounty announced that construction costs for the Pioneer farm had risen to $485–495 million. The company also entered into a non-binding memorandum of understanding with Noble Salmon to build and operate a recirculating aquaculture system (RAS) salmon farm in the Republic of Georgia.

On February 14, 2024, the company announced that it would sell its Indiana farm in order to continue funding the new Pioneer farm, which was now 30 percent completed. The sale was completed by July for $9.2 million.

In April 2024, AquaBounty obtained a $10 million short-term loan, maturing on July 31, 2024.

On June 7, 2024, David F. Melbourne Jr. became president and CEO of AquaBounty with the previous CEO, Sylvia Wulf, becoming board chair of the board of directors.

On September 3, 2024, the company announced that it would sell its farm in Rollo Bay, Prince Edward Island.

On December 6, 2024, CEO David F. Melbourne Jr. resigned from the company.

On December 11, 2024, the company announced it would wind down operations at its Bay Fortune site on Prince Edward Island, its last operating farm. Interim CEO David Frank said the company did not have sufficient liquidity to maintain operations at the facility.

On March 3, 2025, The sale of the company's Canadian farms, including the trademarks and patents for AquAdvantage salmon, was complete. Totaling $1.9 million.

To maintain operations, the company continued to auction available equipment from the Pioneer Farm Project throughout 2025.

== Products ==
The company has developed hybrid salmon, trout, and tilapia designed to grow faster than traditional fish. Only the salmon has progressed to government (Canada, United States) approvals and are the first genetically modified animals approved for consumption. Their hybrid Atlantic salmon incorporates a gene from a Chinook salmon, which bears a single copy of the stably integrated α-form of the opAFP-GHc2 gene construct at the α-locus in the EO-1α line (Ocean Pout AKA Eel). AquaBounty has patented and trademarked this fish as the AquAdvantage salmon, a sterile Atlantic salmon female that can grow to market size in half the time of conventional salmon.

The company was reported to have made its first sale of 4.5 metric tons (4.4 long tons; 5.0 short tons) of AquaAdvantage salmon to Canadian customers in July 2017. Sales in the U.S. started May 2021.

== Finances ==
In 2012, a New York Times article reported the finances of AquaBounty were not in good shape and the company had to reduce staff from 27 to 12. In March 2012, AquaBounty raised US$2 million in new capital, but this would only last until the end of the year. Georgian investor Kakha Bendukidze owned 47.6% of the company's stock before selling to American synthetic biology firm Intrexon in October 2012. Intrexon put up $500,000 in bridge financing and offered to buy the rest of the company. Intrexon acquired majority ownership of AquaBounty in 2013. In 2019 Intrexon sold AquaBounty - which continues as a publicly held company - to TS Aquaculture, LLC, a privately held company managed by Third Security, LLC, a venture capital firm led by former Intrexon Chairman & CEO Randal J. Kirk.

Due to the unexpected construction costs of its new farm in Pioneer, Ohio, AquaBounty sold all of its other farms, trademarks, and patents, as well as a significant portion of its assets. The company became dependent on the sale of assets, particularly those from the planned Pioneer farm. Asset sales in 2025 totaled $7.1 million.

A September 30, 2025 Securities and Exchange Commission filing by the company reports a deficit of $374 million and $951,000 in cash and cash equivalents. The same document states, "If we are unable to generate additional funds in a timely manner, we will exhaust our resources and will be unable to maintain our currently planned operations. If we cannot continue as a going concern, our stockholders would likely lose most or all of their investment in us."
