= Precigen =

American biotechnology company

Precigen, Inc.
- Traded as: Nasdaq: PGEN; Russell 2000 Component
- Industry: Biotechnology
- Founded: May 21, 1998; 28 years ago
- Headquarters: Germantown, Maryland, US
- Revenue: ▲$91 million (2019)
- Number of employees: 600
- Website: precigen.com

Precigen, Inc. (formerly Intrexon Corporation, NASDAQ: PGEN) is an American biotechnology company. Its president and CEO is Helen Sabzevari.

Intrexon was founded in 1998, and is headquartered in Germantown, Maryland. With a suite of proprietary and complementary technologies, Intrexon applies engineering to biological systems to enable DNA-based control over the function and output of living cells.

== History ==
In 2015, Intrexon purchased Oxitec, a maker of genetically sterile insects, for $160 million. In April 2019, Intrexon formed a subsidiary called Precigen, with a focus on human gene therapy. Precigen went on to win orphan drug status from the FDA for a CAR-T based therapy (investigational drug name PRGN-3006) to treat acute myeloid leukemia. In early 2020, Intrexon adopted the name of its subsidiary, Precigen, and narrowed its focus to human gene editing. With the change in name the CEO of subsidiary Precigen, Helen Sabzevari, took over leadership of the company from Randal J. Kirk.

In 2025, Precigen received their first FDA drug approval for the drug zopapogene imadenovec-drba, marketed under the name PAPZIMEOS, as the first and only FDA-approved therapy for adults with recurrent respiratory papillomatosis (RRP).

== See also ==
- Ginkgo Bioworks
- Zymergen
