= John M. Gregory (businessman) =

John M. Gregory is an American businessman. He was former CEO of King Pharmaceuticals, Inc. and resides in Bristol, Tennessee. In addition to founding King Pharmaceuticals in 1993, Gregory has founded several other notable business ventures including SJ Strategic Investments (a privately held investment firm) and Leitner Pharmaceuticals. Gregory has also made major investment outside of the pharmaceutical industry, such as his investments within the privately held United Coal Company located in southwest Virginia and Adams Golf with U.S. corporate offices in Texas. Most recently, Gregory, along with other family members, began Gregory Pharmaceutical Holdings Inc. which include pharmaceutical contract manufacturing company, UPM Pharmaceuticals, and NFI Consumer Products which includes the Blue-Emu brand of products.

== King Pharmaceuticals, Inc. activities ==
On October 29, 1991, the U.S. Patent and Trademark Office awarded the German pharmaceuticals company Hoechst AG a patent entitled Hypotensive agents; e.g. ramipril. Altace is the trademarked name for ramipril.

Hoechst merged with Marion Merrill Dow of Kansas City, Missouri in 1995, forming the Hoechst U.S. pharmaceutical subsidiary Hoechst Marion Roussel (HMR). Altace was bringing in under $90 million in U.S. revenues for HMR and Hoechst had stopped promoting Altace within the United States., and King Pharmaceuticals President Jefferson "Jeff" Gregory also began negotiations in 1995 with Hoechst to acquire U.S. distribution rights to Altace.

The King Pharmaceuticals wholly owned subsidiary Monarch Pharmaceuticals, Inc. (another brother of John Gregory – Joseph Gregory – was then the president of Monarch Pharmaceuticals) acquired ownership of the U.S. distribution and marketing rights to Altace and other Hoescht products from Hoescht AG subsidiary Hoechst Marion Roussel of Kansas City, Missouri on December 18, 1998, following a January 1999 merger a few weeks later with Rhône-Poulenc, Hoechst assumed the new corporate identity of Aventis).

In 2001, Forbes magazine ranked John Gregory among the 400 richest Americans. The bulk of Gregory's personal fortune was due in large part due to the ability of King Pharmaceuticals, Inc. to reintroduce the Hoechst branded prescription drug Altace back into the U.S. market under the King Pharmaceuticals, Inc. subsidiary Monarch Pharmaceuticals brand following the 1998 U.S. marketing and distribution agreement between KingPharmaceuticals/Monarch and Hoechst/HMR.
