= Greenfish recirculation technology =

Water purification for fish farms

Developed in Sweden, the Greenfish recirculation technology is a water purification technology for sustainable aquaculture production in closed indoor freshwater systems. It was developed at University of Gothenburg by Björn Lindén in collaboration with Chalmers associate professor Torsten Wik, under the supervision of professor emeritus Gustaf Olsson at Lund University of Technology.

Several published articles , , , have appeared as well as verification of the system in full-scale farming operations with wet feed and semi-moist fish feed. One of the most important describes the advanced simulator for full-scale recirculation in an aquaculture system with algorithms for complete mass balances calculations, involving: growth of fish, addition of fish feeds, production of waste, bacterial growth and the dynamics of the water purification system.

In the system no less than 28 different parameters of bacterial substrates are described to simulate the water purification dynamics of the system.

The microbial scientific basics and water purification technology and engineering rests on formidable scientific knowledge, as can be followed in further references , , , , , , , , , , , , , , , , , .
