= King Pharmaceuticals =

American pharmaceutical company

King Pharmaceuticals, Inc.
- Type: Subsidiary
- Traded as: NYSE: KG
- Industry: Pharmaceutical company, health care
- Founded: 1994; 32 years ago
- Headquarters: Bristol, Tennessee, U.S.
- Key people: Brian Markison (CEO); Joseph Squicciarino (CFO); Eric J. Bruce (CTO)
- Products: Pharmaceuticals
- Revenue: $1.7 billion USD (2009)
- Operating income: $236 million USD (2009)
- Net income: $92 million USD (2009)
- Number of employees: 3,381
- Parent: Pfizer
- Website: kingpharm.com

King Pharmaceuticals, Inc. is a pharmaceutical company, a wholly owned subsidiary of Pfizer based in Bristol, Tennessee. Before being acquired by Pfizer, it was the world's 39th largest pharmaceutical company. On October 12, 2010, King was acquired by Pfizer for $14.25 per share. King produced a wide range of pharmaceuticals, including Altace for heart attack prevention, Levoxyl for hypothyroidism, Sonata, a sleeping aid, and Skelaxin, a muscle relaxant. King Pharmaceuticals operated manufacturing facilities in Bristol, Tennessee; Rochester, Michigan; St. Louis, Missouri; St. Petersburg, Florida; and Middleton, Wisconsin. They employed approximately 2,700 people including a sales force of over 1,000 individuals.

King Pharmaceuticals, Inc. was incorporated in the State of Tennessee in 1993. According to the King Pharmaceutcals, Inc. Form 10-K for the year ended December 31, 2007 filed with the U.S. Securities and Exchange Commission, the wholly owned subsidiaries of King Pharmaceuticals, Inc. are Monarch Pharmaceuticals, Inc.; King Pharmaceuticals Research and Development, Inc.; Meridian Medical Technologies, Inc.; Parkedale Pharmaceuticals, Inc.; King Pharmaceuticals Canada Inc.; and Monarch Pharmaceuticals Ireland Limited.

== Company history ==
King Pharmaceuticals was founded in 1993 John M. Gregory, Randal J. Kirk, Joseph "Joe" R. Gregory, Jefferson "Jeff" J. Gregory, and James E. Gregory. In January 1994, King acquired a former King College campus plant in Bristol, Tennessee. The 500,000-square-foot (46,000 m^{2}) facility was purchased for $1.18 million from RSR Pharmaceutical, who had been using it after Beecham merged with SmithKline. King initially manufactured drugs for other pharmaceutical companies, but soon established a strategy of acquiring branded prescription drugs, which have a much higher gross margin than contract manufactured drugs.

In February 1998, King acquired 15 branded pharmaceuticals, a sterile products manufacturing facility located in Rochester, Michigan that it called the "Parkedale Facility") and some contract manufacturing contracts. By December 1998 King had placed its sterile products business into a subsidiary it named Parkedale Pharmaceuticals.

King Pharmaceuticals obtained about twenty smaller branded drugs from the start up of the company until it went public in June 1998. The King Pharmaceuticals subsidiary Monarch Pharmaceuticals acquired one of its most profitable branded drugs, Altace, later the same year on December 18, 1998 from Hoechst Marion Roussel.

== U.S. marketing and distribution rights to Altace ==
Hoechst merged with Marion Merrill Dow of Kansas City, Missouri in 1995, forming the Hoechst U.S. pharmaceutical subsidiary Hoechst Marion Roussel (HMR). Altace was bringing in under $90 million in U.S. revenues for HMR and Hoechst had stopped promoting Altace within the United States., and King Pharmaceuticals President Jefferson "Jeff" Gregory also began negotiations in 1995 with Hoechst to acquire U.S. distribution rights to Altace.

The King Pharmaceuticals wholly owned subsidiary Monarch Pharmaceuticals, Inc. (another brother of John Gregory - Joseph Gregory - was then the president of Monarch Pharmaceuticals) acquired ownership of the U.S. distribution and marketing rights to Altace and other Hoechst products from Hoechst AG subsidiary Hoechst Marion Roussel of Kansas City, Missouri on December 18, 1998, and following a January 1999 merger a few weeks later with Rhône-Poulenc, Hoechst assumed the new corporate identity of Aventis).

In 2001, Forbes magazine ranked John Gregory among the 400 richest Americans. The bulk of Gregory's personal fortune was due in large part due to the ability of King Pharmaceuticals, Inc. to reintroduce the Hoechst branded prescription drug Altace back into the U.S. market under the King Pharmaceuticals, Inc. subsidiary Monarch Pharmaceuticals brand following the 1998 U.S. marketing and distribution agreement between King Pharmaceuticals/Monarch Pharmaceuticals and Hoechst AG/HMR.

In late December 1998, King Pharmaceuticals (d.b.a. Monarch Pharmaceuticals, Inc.) purchased the U.S. marketing and distribution rights of the company's most successful drug, Altace, for $362.5 million from the U.S. subsidiary of Hoechst AG, Hoechst Marion Roussel of Kansas City. As a result of increasing the number of sales representatives and the findings of the Heart Outcomes Prevention Evaluation (HOPE), Altace sales increased. Using profits from Altace, King continued to add product lines, the most significant purchases being Levoxyl, Thrombin, and Cytomel in 2000. Also in 2000, seeing fewer opportunities to obtain branded drugs, the company acquired an R&D company based in North Carolina. In 2002, King and Meridian Medical Technologies agreed that King would purchase Merdian for $247.8 million in cash; Meridian was a manufacturer of autoinjectors, including EpiPen, an epinephrine autoinjector. The deal was completed in January 2003.

In 2002, John Gregory stepped down as CEO, and his brother Jefferson Gregory took over. Then in 2004, Jeff Gregory stepped down as well after the SEC began investigations into King's Medicaid billing practices. The board named Brian Markison to replace him. Soon after, in July 2004, a deal was made for Mylan Laboratories to acquire King for $4 billion. Investors, most notably Carl Icahn, were critical of the merger, saying that Mylan was overpaying for King. The next year the deal was called off.

In 2008 King Pharmaceuticals acquired Alpharma Pharmaceuticals to expand into the pain treatment market. From the acquisition, King gained the patents on the pain management drugs, Flector and Embeda. They also gained a completely separate animal health division, which focuses on the many agricultural and animal health needs of livestock animals.

== Acquisition ==
On October 12, 2010, Pfizer Inc. (NYSE: PFE) announced it would acquire Bristol-based King Pharmaceuticals, Inc. for a total cost to Pfizer of $3.6 billion in cash or $14.25 per share. The acquisition was expected to expand Pfizer's product line of pain relief and management medication by adding King products such as Embeda, Avinza, and the Flector Patch. Other product lines that made King attractive to Pfizer included the EpiPen for emergency delivery of medications and the Alpharma animal health line.
