= Japonolycodes =

Scientific classification
- Kingdom: Animalia
- Phylum: Chordata
- Class: Actinopterygii
- Order: Perciformes
- Family: Zoarcidae
- Subfamily: Lycodinae
- Genus: Japonolycodes; Shinohara, Sakurai & Machida, 2002
- Species: J. abei

Binomial name
- Japonolycodes abei (Matsubara, 1936)

Synonyms
- Davidijordania abei Matsubara, 1936

Genus of fish

Japonolycodes is a monospecific genus of marine ray-finned fish belonging to the family Zoarcidae, the eelpouts. The only species in the genus is Japonolycodes abei. This species is found Northwestern Pacific Ocean off Japan.

== Taxonomy ==
Japanolycodes was first proposed as a genus in 2002 by the Japanese zoologists Gento Shinohara, Hiroshi Sakurai and Y. Machida with Davidijordania abei as its type species and only species, J. abei. D. abei had originally been described by Kiyomatsu Matsubara from the Kumano Sea on the Pacific coast of Mie Prefecture on Honshu in Japan. In 2002 Shinohara, Sakurai and Machida obtained new specimens, as well as re-examining the older specimens, and were able to erect a new monotypic genus, Japonolycodes, for this taxon. They were also able to show that this taxon lacks the derived features of the subfamily Gymnelinae and belongs in the more basal Lycodinae. Some authorities recognise a second species in this genus, Japonolycodes magellanicus (M.E. Anderson, 1988) from the southwestern Atlantic Ocean, but FishBase classifies this species within the genus Letholycus.

== Etymology ==
Japanolycodes is a combination of japon, meaning "Japan", and the genus Lycodes, the type genus of the subfamily Lycodinae. The specific name honours the collector of the type, Genkiti Abe of Nisiura in the Aichi Prefecture.

== Distribution and habitat ==
Japonolycodes abei is known only from Japan where it has been collected from Kumano-nada Sea, Sagami Bay and Tosa Bay at depths between 360 and 740 m (1,180 and 2,430 ft).

== Biology ==
Japonolycodes abei is likely to spawn in the Autumn as a female specimen taken in August had mature eggs. One captive fish lived for 11 years in an aquarium.
