= Magadania =

Magadania may refer to:

- Magadania (brachiopod), a fossil genus of brachiopods in the family Monticuliferidae
- Magadania (plant), a genus of plants in the family Apiaceae
- Magadania, a genus of fishes in the family Zoarcidae, synonym of Magadanichthys
