= Lycozoarces =

Scientific classification
- Kingdom: Animalia
- Phylum: Chordata
- Class: Actinopterygii
- Order: Perciformes
- Family: Zoarcidae
- Subfamily: Lycozoarcinae; Andriyashev, 1939
- Genus: Lycozoarces; Popov, 1935
- Species: L. regani

Binomial name
- Lycozoarces regani Popov, 1933

Synonyms
- Lycozoarces hubbsi Popov, 1935

Monospecific genus of marine ray-finned fish

Lycozoarces is a monospecific genus of marine ray-finned fish belonging to the family Zoarcidae, the eelpouts, its only species being Lycozoarces regani. It is the only genus in the monogeneric subfamily Lycozoarinae. This taxon occurs in the northwestern Pacific Ocean in the Sea of Okhotsk and the Tatar Strait in the northern Sea of Japan.

== Taxonomy ==
Lycozoarces was first proposed as a genus in 1935 by the Soviet ichthyologist Alexander Mikhailovich Popov, although he had used the name in 1933 when he gave a short description and illustration of L. regani from the Strait of Tartary but not enough of a combined description to satisfy the ICZN. In 1935 he described L. hubbsi and described Lycozoarces as a new genus despite having used it in 1933. Under the ICZN Popov's first use of the generic name means that it was a nomen nudum, although that did not prevent him using it in 1935 for L. hubbsi, but as L regani is an older name than L. hubbsi then the that name is a junior synonym of L. regani, and L. hubbsi seems to have been applied to male specimens of this sexually dimorphic species. Lycozoarces is the only genus classified within the subfamily Lycozoarcinae, one of 4 subfamilies in the family Zoarcidae.

== Etymology ==
Lycozoarces is likely a combination of Lycodes and Zoarces as this taxon shows features intermediate between those taxa, and the subfamilies named after then, Lycodinae and Zoarcinae. The specific name honours Charles Tate Regan, the English ichthyologist of the British Museum (Natural History), who in 1913 had described a number of Antarctic eelpouts.

== Characteristics ==
Lycozoarces is distinguished from all the other eelpouts by having pelvic fins and a branchiostegal membrane which has a wide joint and creates a fold over the isthmus. They have a relatively robust body and tail, an interorbital pore, the caudal fin has 13 to 15 fin rays and the 5 or 6 suborbital bones form a semicircle around the eye. There are no fin spines and L. regani shows marked sexual dimorphism. The males have longer dorsal and anal fin rays, a longer upper jaw and are darker in colour. The maximum published standard length for L. regani is 15.2 cm (6.0 in).

== Distribution and habitat ==
Lycozoarces is found in the northwestern Pacific Ocean in the Sea of Okhtosk and the northern Sea of Japan. It is a demersal fish found at depths of between 50 and 300 m (160 and 980 ft).
