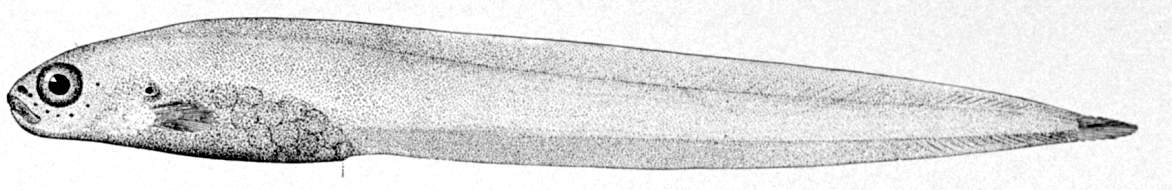
- From plate 82 of Oceanic Ichthyology by G. Brown Goode and Tarleton H. Bean, published 1896.

Scientific classification
- Kingdom: Animalia
- Phylum: Chordata
- Class: Actinopterygii
- Order: Perciformes
- Family: Zoarcidae
- Subfamily: Gymnelinae
- Genus: Melanostigma; Kirschstein, 1939
- Species: M. gelatinosum

Binomial name
- Melanostigma gelatinosum Günther, 1881

= Limp eelpout =

Species of fish

The limp eelpout (Melanostigma gelatinosum) is a marine ray-finned fish belonging to the family Zoarcidae, the eelpouts. It is the type species of the genus Melanostigma, and this species is found in all oceans at depths of between 50 and 2,500 m (160 and 8,200 ft). This species has a maximum published total length of 29 cm (11 in).
