= Lycodes terraenovae =

Conservation status
- Data Deficient (IUCN 3.1)

Scientific classification
- Kingdom: Animalia
- Phylum: Chordata
- Class: Actinopterygii
- Order: Perciformes
- Family: Zoarcidae
- Genus: Lycodes
- Species: L. terraenovae

Binomial name
- Lycodes terraenovae (Collett, 1896)

Synonyms
- Lycodes agulhensis Andriashev, 1959; Lycodes atlanticus Jensen, 1902; Lycodes atratus Vladykov & Tremblay, 1936; Lycodes brunneus Fowler, 1944

Species of fish

Lycodes terraenovae, also called the Newfoundland eelpout, Atlantic eelpout or fish doctor, is a species of marine ray-finned fish belonging to the family Zoarcidae, the eelpouts. It is found in deep waters of the Atlantic Ocean.

== Taxonomy ==
Lycodes terraenovae was first formally described in 1896 by the Norwegian zoologist Robert Collett with the type locality given as the Newfoundland Banks in the northwestern Atlantic. Within the genus Lycodes this species is classified within the nominate subgenus, Lycodes. The specific name refers to Newfoundland, referring to the type locality of the Newfoundland Banks.

== Description ==
Lycodes terraenovae is maximum 45.2 cm (17.8 in) long and dark brown-purple in colour. It has a double lateral line. The body is scaled, the pores on the head are unreduced and the tail is long.

== Distribution and habitat ==
Lycodes terraenovae is found in the Atlantic Ocean where it has been recorded from the Davis Strait, off Newfoundland and Middle Atlantic Bight in the Western North Atlantic and in the Eastern Atlantic from the Rockall Trough and Bill Bailey Bank, south to the waters off Mauritania and southwestern Africa. It is found at depths between 630 and 2,604 m (2,067 and 8,543 ft) and it is a bathydemersal species.

== Biology ==
Lycodes terraenovae eats sponge remains, polychaetes, shelled molluscs, crustaceans, brittle stars and pycnogonids. These fishes attain sexual maturity as they approach their maximum size and the females lay a small number of large eggs, these are probably deposited in shallow depressions in mud.

Clavella pinguis is a copepod parasite of Lycodes terraenovae.
