= Hadropogonichthys lindbergi =

Conservation status
- Least Concern (IUCN 3.1)

Scientific classification
- Kingdom: Animalia
- Phylum: Chordata
- Class: Actinopterygii
- Order: Perciformes
- Family: Zoarcidae
- Subfamily: Lycodinae
- Genus: Hadropogonichthys
- Species: H. lindbergi

Binomial name
- Hadropogonichthys lindbergi Fedorov, 1982

Species of fish

Hadropogonichthys lindbergi is a species of marine ray-finned fish belonging to the family Zoarcidae, the eelpouts. The species is found in the northwestern Pacific Ocean.
