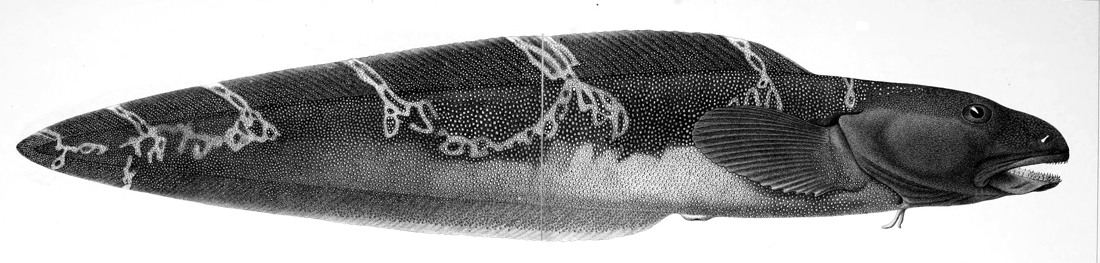

Conservation status
- Least Concern (IUCN 3.1)

Scientific classification
- Kingdom: Animalia
- Phylum: Chordata
- Class: Actinopterygii
- Order: Perciformes
- Family: Zoarcidae
- Genus: Lycodes
- Species: L. esmarkii

Binomial name
- Lycodes esmarkii Collett, 1875

Synonyms
- Lycodes vachonii Vladykov & Tremblay, 1936

= Lycodes esmarkii =

Species of fish

Lycodes esmarkii, Esmark's eelpout or the greater eelpout, is a species of marine ray-finned fish belonging to the family Zoarcidae, the eelpouts. This species is found in the North Atlantic Ocean.

== Taxonomy ==
Lycodes esmarkii was first formally described by the Norwegian zoologist Robert Collett with the type locality given as Varanger Fjord in northern Norway. The specific name honours Collett's fellow Norwegian zoologist Lauritz Martin Esmark, who was the first to recognise that this taxon was a new species but who pernmitted Collett to describe it as such.

== Description ==
Lycodes esmarkii has a dark uper body with a pale lower body, the two colour areas being sharply demarcated, there are between 4 and 9 irregular, pale bands which vary from simple stripes to more complex shapes. A white bar runs across the head and there are two spots above the lobes of the operculum. The peritoneum and inside of the mouth are black. The elongate body has a depth at the origin of the anal fin of between 11% and 14% of its total length. This is a long-tailed eelpout, with the distance from the snout to the origin of the anal fin being equivalent of 36% to 44% of the total length. The head is moderate in size being equal to 21% to 25% of the total length. The origin of the dorsal fin is over the centre of the pectoral fin, the pectoral fins are rounded and of moderate length. There is a double lateral line with a lower branch running near to the anal fin and a branch along the middle of the flank. The pores on the head are small and the body has a dense covering of scales. The length of the row of teeth on the premaxilla is longer than the row on the palatine. This is a large species and has benn recorded as attaining a total length of 102 cm (40 in) off Iceland.

== Distribution and habitat ==
Lycodes esmarkii is found in the North Atlantic Ocean from Virginia to Labrador, as well as Baffin Island, Greenland, Iceland and the Faroe Islands, It is also found along the Norwegian coast, the southeastern Barents Sea and Svalbard. It occurs along the Wyville Thomson Ridge as far south as the Shetland Islands and as far south as Stadt in Norway. The greater eelpout is a bathydemersal species which occurs at depths between 143 and 1,090 m (469 and 3,576 ft) where the temperature varies between −0.6 and 5.6 °C (30.9 and 42.1 °F). It is found on soft substrates.

== Biology ==
Lycodes esmarkii has a diet which is heavily dominated by brittle stars. ). Females reach sexual maturity at a length of around 35 cm (14 in) while for males it is attained at around 38 cm (15 in) in the Davis Strait. They may reach an age of 12 years, based on otoliths sampled from a specimen with a total length of 63 cm (25 in) taken in the Barents Sea.
