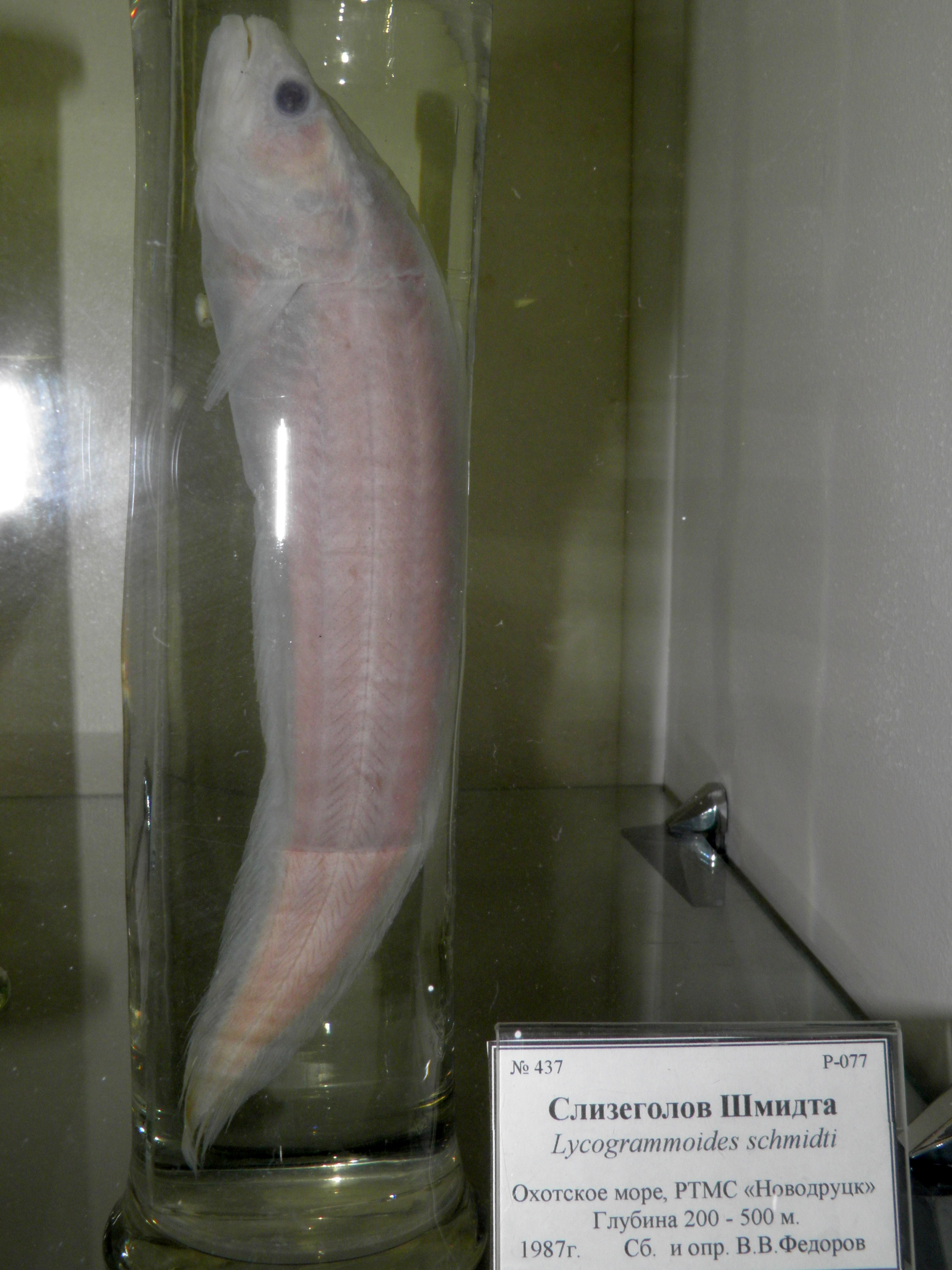

Scientific classification
- Kingdom: Animalia
- Phylum: Chordata
- Class: Actinopterygii
- Order: Perciformes
- Family: Zoarcidae
- Subfamily: Lycodinae
- Genus: Lycogrammoides; Soldatov & Lindberg, 1928
- Species: L. schmidti

Binomial name
- Lycogrammoides schmidti Soldatov & Lindberg, 1928

= Lycogrammoides =

Monospecific genus of marine ray-finned fish

Lycogrammoides is a monospecific genus of marine ray-finned fish belonging to the family Zoarcidae, the eelpouts. Its only species is Lycogrammoides schmidti, a rare species of the Sea of Okhotsk in the northwestern Pacific Ocean.

== Taxonomy ==
Lycogrammoides was first proposed as a monospecific genus in 1928 by the Soviet zoologists Vladimir Soldatov and Georgiĭ Ustinovich Lindberg when they described Lycogrammoides schmidti. The type locality of this species is Tauyskaya Bay, off Ol'skii Island in the northern Sea of Okhotsk at a depth of 108 m (354 ft). This genus is classified within the subfamily Lycodinae, one of 4 subfamilies in the family Zoarcidae, the eelpouts. This genus is the sister taxon to Bothrocara, Bothrocarina and Lycodapus, and these four genera form a clade within the subfamily Lycodinae.

== Etymology ==
Lycogrammoides means having the form of Lycogrammus, a synonym of Bothrocara. The specific name honours the Soviet ichthyologist and worker on the fishes of the Russian Far East, Peter Schmidt.

== Characteristics ==
Lycogrammoides is characterised within the Lycodinae by having 6 suborbital bones and 6, rarely 7, pores.The males have canine like teeth. The flesh is gelatinous and scales extend quite far on to the head, reaching the cheek and nose. There is a pseudobranch, a pyloric caeca, a lateral line, vomerine and palatine teeth while they lack an oral valve and pelvic fins. There are 9 fin rays in the pectoral fin. L. schmidti has a maximum published total length of 42 cm (17 in).

== Distribution and habitat ==
Lycogrammoides is only known from the Sea of Okhotsk's outer shelf. It is a demersal fish found at depths between 30 and 1,440 m (98 and 4,724 ft).
