= Gymnelus popovi =

Scientific classification
- Kingdom: Animalia
- Phylum: Chordata
- Class: Actinopterygii
- Order: Perciformes
- Family: Zoarcidae
- Genus: Gymnelus
- Species: G. popovi

Binomial name
- Gymnelus popovi (Taranetz & Andriashev, 1935)

Species of ray-finned fish

Gymnelus popovi, also known as the Aleutian pout, is a species of fish in the family Zoarcidae in the order Perciformes.

The males can reach a total length of 10 cm (3.9 in).

Gymnelus popovi is found in the Kuril Islands and in the Aleutian Islands from the Commander Islands to Kodiak Island. This is a polar sea fish that lives at depths between 0 and 4 m (0 and 13 ft).

It is harmless to humans.
