= Petroschmidtia =

Scientific classification
- Kingdom: Animalia
- Phylum: Chordata
- Class: Actinopterygii
- Order: Perciformes
- Family: Zoarcidae
- Subfamily: Lycodinae
- Genus: Petroschmidtia; Taranetz & Andriashev, 1934

Type species
- Petroschmidtia albonotata Taranetz & Andriashev, 1934

Genus of fishes

Petroschmidtia is a genus of marine ray-finned fishes belonging to the family Zoarcidae, the eelpouts. The species in this genus are placed in the genus Lycodes by FishBase but Catalog of Fishes recognises this as a valid genus.

== Species ==
There are currently 4 recognized species in this genus:

- Petroschmidtia albonotata (Taranetz & Andriashev, 1934) (Whitebar eelpout)
- Petroschmidtia teraoi (Katayama, 1943)
- Petroschmidtia toyamensis Katayama, 1941
- Petroschmidtia uschakovi (Popov, 1931)
