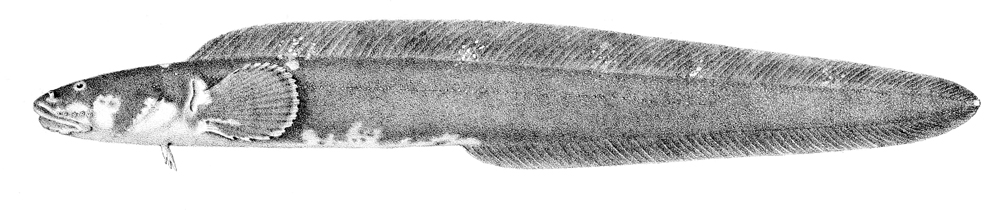
- Austrolycus depressiceps
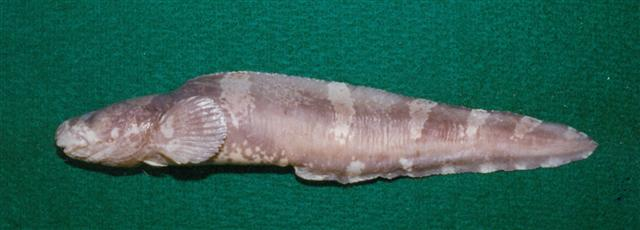
- Austrolycus laticinctus

Scientific classification
- Kingdom: Animalia
- Phylum: Chordata
- Class: Actinopterygii
- Order: Perciformes
- Family: Zoarcidae
- Subfamily: Lycodinae
- Genus: Austrolycus; Regan, 1913

Type species
- Austrolycus depressiceps Regan, 1913

= Austrolycus =

Genus of fishes

Austrolycus is a genus of marine ray-finned fishes belonging to the family Zoarcidae, the eelpouts. The two species in this genus are found in the southeastern Pacific Ocean and the western South Atlantic Ocean off southern South America and the Falkland Islands.

== Taxonomy ==
Austrolycus was first proposed as a monospecific genus by the English zoologist Charles Tate Regan in 1913 when he described Austrolycus depressiceps, giving the type locality as the Magellan Strait. Later, Lycodes laticinctus, which had been described by Carlos Berg in 1895 from mouth of the Rio Santa Cruz in Argentina, was placed within Austrolycus. This genus is classified within the subfamily Lycodinae, one of 4 subfamilies in the family Zoarcidae, the eelpouts.

== Species ==
Austrolycus contains two species:

- Austrolycus depressiceps Regan, 1913
- Austrolycus laticinctus (C. Berg, 1895)

== Etymology ==
Austrolycus is a compound of austro meaning "south" and lykos, meaning "wolf"in Greek. the root of the type genus of the Lycodinae, Lyciodes.

== Characteristics ==
Austrolycus eelpouts have pelvic fins and they have 6 branchiostegal rays. The gill slit does not extend down as far as the lower rays of the pectoral fins. There are between 27 and 33 vertebrae before the caudal fin. They do not have a pyloric caecum. There are 6 or 7 pores below the eye and a single one behind the eye above the gill slit. The lack of a whitish strip on snout and head distinguishes these species from Phucocoetes latitans. In A. depressiceps the pelvic fins do not extend as far as, or just reach a vertical line through the base of the pectoral fin base and there are between 72 and 79 caudal vertrebrae. In A. laticinctus the pelvic fins clearly extend beyond a vertical line through the base of the pectoral fin and there are 80-89 caudal vertebrae. The maximum published total lengths of theses eelpouts are 57 cm (22 in) in A. depressiceps and 82.4 cm (32.4 in) in A. laticinctus.

== Distribution and habitat ==
Austrolycus eelpouts are found around southern South America. depressiceps is found in the southeastern Pacific Ocean from Chiloé Island south to Tierra del Fuego and it also occurs in the South Atlantic at the Falkland Islands, while A. laticinctus is found in the southwestern Atlantic in Argentina from Puerto Deseado south to Tierra del Fuego. These demersal fishes are found in rocky areas in estuaries and in well vegetated areas of the intertidal zone.
