= Bilabria =

Scientific classification
- Kingdom: Animalia
- Phylum: Chordata
- Class: Actinopterygii
- Order: Perciformes
- Family: Zoarcidae
- Subfamily: Gymnelinae
- Genus: Bilabria; Schmidt, 1936

Type species
- Lycenchelys ornatus Soldatov, 1922

Genus of fishes

Bilabria is a genus of marine ray-finned fishes belonging to the family Zoarcidae, the eelpouts. The fishes in this genus are found in the northwestern Pacific Ocean.

== Species ==
The following species are classified within the genus Bilabria:

- Bilabria gigantea Anderson & Imamura, 2008
- Bilabria ornata (Soldatov, 1922)
