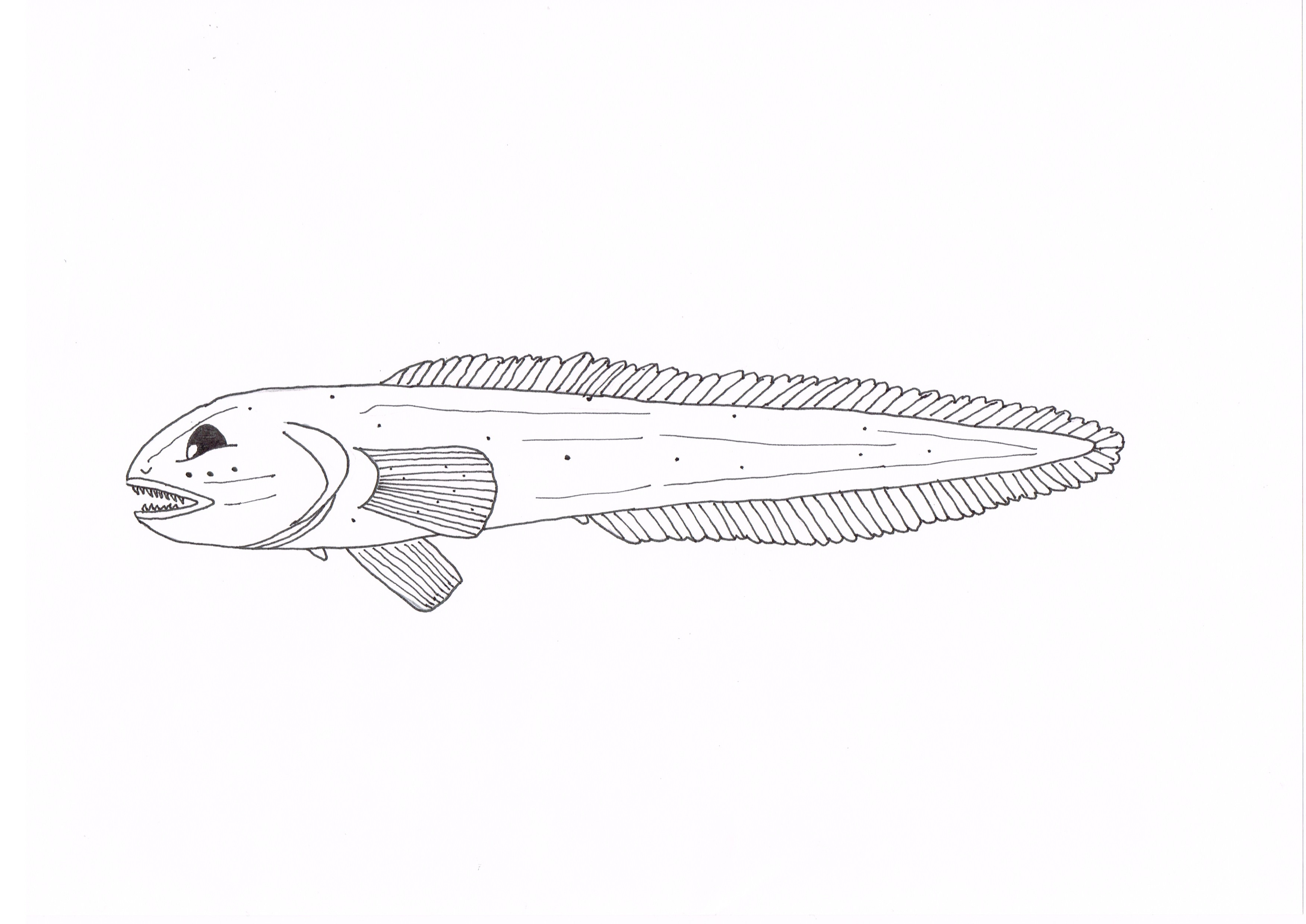
- Artist's depiction of Pyrolycus jaco

Scientific classification
- Kingdom: Animalia
- Phylum: Chordata
- Class: Actinopterygii
- Division: Teleostei
- Order: Perciformes
- Family: Zoarcidae
- Genus: Pyrolycus
- Species: P. jaco

Binomial name
- Pyrolycus jaco Frable, Seid, Bronson, & Møller, 2023

= Pyrolycus jaco =

Species of eelpout

Pyrolycus jaco is a species of eelpout belonging to the Zoarcidae family. These organisms are typically distinguished by their eel-like morphology and, in certain species, facial features that evoke an appearance of "pouting". This species was named after its place of discovery at Jacó Scar, a hydrothermal seep site in the Pacific Ocean.

== Discovery ==
Researchers from Scripps Institution of Oceanography discovered the species and collected four specimens. It was first detailed in a paper published in the journal Zootaxa on January 19, 2023.

== Geographic Range ==
Pyrolycus jaco is a species found in the Eastern Pacific Ocean off the coast of Costa Rica. This species is exclusively found in the Jacó Scar hydrothermal seep. This species is the fourth member of the Zoarcidae family associated with the deep-sea hydrothermal and methane sites in the eastern Pacific to be discovered following Thermacres andersoni and T. cerberus, Rosenblatt & Cohen 1986, and Pachycara rimae, Anderson 1989.

== Physical Description ==
Pyrolycus jaco is long and slender with an eel-like appearance. Its body is semi-translucent with a pale pink and purple color. The underside, snout, and jaw are darker than the rest of the body. The fins are similar to the body, being semi-translucent and light in color. There is a faint, light brown colored pattern on most of the fish. This fish contains no lateral line or scales and has gelatinous flesh. The skin resembles that of human flesh in color and texture. The pectoral fin has between fourteen and fifteen rays within them and sixteen to seventeen gill rakers. The fins appear to be smooth and seamlessly connected to the body with a thick membrane between each fin ray. Pyrolycus jaco has two types of teeth which are a mixture of palatine and vomerine teeth. A long gill slit is present and reaches above the pectoral fin. This fin includes seven to eight dorsal fin rays and is found close to the midline of the body. Located anterior to the pectoral fin is the beginning of the pelvic fin. Just above the middle of that pectoral fin is where the dorsal fin begins. The anal fin then starts close to the middle of the body. There are five suborbital bones present arranged in an L-shaped pattern. This species includes many differences in the number of pores from close relatives, setting it apart from others within the same family. Pores of this fish are prominent on the skull just below the eyes and above the gill slits. There are two nasal pores, three postorbital pores, and two occipital pores which are the smallest of the pores. This fish lacks the interorbital pore. The head of Pyrolycus jaco has a long neurocranium and small rounded eyes. The maxilla doesn't extend past the middle of the eye. The snout of this species is relatively round and does not go past the upper jaw. The Pyrolycus jaco also has two nubs of pyloric caeca present within it.

== Habitat ==
Pyrolycus jaco is only found in a hydrothermal seep named Jacó Scar. It is extremely rare for fish families to adapt to live in places like hydrothermal vents and methane seeps. The Pyrolycus jaco belongs to the family Zoarcidae, which is one out of seven families of fish that can live in these extreme environments. Jacó Scar is a unique habitat in that it is a composite reducing habitat that acts like a vent. Composite reducing habitats use composite materials to reduce the mass of habitats while maximizing the strength of the structure. This habitat ranges from 1,604 to 1,854 meters in depth, measures at about five degrees Celsius and contains plants and animals typically found near vents. The Pyrolycus jaco is found living within tubeworm colonies and has not been found outside of this population.

== Development ==
There is a lack of information on the development of Pyrolycus jaco specifically. Its relatives in the Zoarcidae family develop slowly in comparison to other fish regardless of temperature. Like most fish, they develop even slower in cold temperatures. In warm climates, they develop quicker and tend to live shorter lives. This may be caused by less energy being available for molecular repair due to high growth rates to avoid predatory and oxidative stressors. Due to the precise location and lifestyle of Pyrolycus jaco, individuals of this species, possibly including this genus, are likely to be minimized in size compared to other zoarcids, accompanied by a reduction or absence of scales and fins, a simplified skeleton, and coloration differences.

== Reproduction ==
Little is known about the reproduction of Pyrolycus jaco. Another type of eelpout in the family Zoarcidae is the Lycenchelys sarsi, which lays about twenty to forty large (up to 5.4mm in diameter) eggs buried under the sediment found in their habitats. This number and behavior is typical of all species within Zoarcidae. Eelpouts reach their prime sexual maturity at two years old. The offspring are typically released between November and December. This fish has a gestation period of seven to eight months. This is long compared to most live-bearing fish, which average a three- to five-week gestation period. On average the female eelpouts can produce between twenty and seventy-two offspring within their lifetime. Though not much is known about the parental care habits of P. jaco, zoarcids as a group occasionally exhibit parental care characteristics. Their eggs hatch benthic larvae that are not widely dispersed. This is a likely factor in the species' extreme endemism to hydrothermal vents and methane seeps.

== Life Span/ Longevity ==
Not enough is known about the longevity of Pyrolycus jaco. Other members of the Zoarcidae family can live to be between 11 and 30 years old. Living in or near hydrothermal vents in colder environments slows their developmental rates. This slower developmental rate causes most fish to develop more slowly and therefore reach sexual maturity at later ages and live longer lives than fish living in warmer water.

== Behavior ==
The behaviors of Pyrolycus jaco are mostly unknown. Pyrolycus jaco is commonly found living among tubeworms in the Jacó Scar hydrothermal seep. There is no information on how or why this species was found living within tubeworm communities, but one possible explanation for why they live among one another is because they occupy similar niches. In Zoarcidae, the knowledge of their behavior is also limited. One species within the family relies on algae that are drifting to provide shelter and food resources.

== Food Habits ==
The Pyrolycus jaco mostly feeds on immobile invertebrates, snails, and other limpets based on the gut contents. Other zoarcids have a similar diet. This suggests that zoarcids aren't particularly active because the organisms consumed were localized and often sessile.

== Predation ==
Not enough is known about Pyrolycus jaco to understand predation within this species. The closely related eelpouts prey on small invertebrates and have been known to be preyed on by arctic skates. They have been caught ingesting Zoarcidae on two different occasions. This is rare because eelpouts are relatively large. In general there is a low amount of predation among Zoarcidae.

== Ecosystem Roles ==
Not enough is known about Pyrolycus jaco roles within an ecosystem. Eelpouts in the Baltic and North Seas are being used as key indicator organisms to determine the environmental health of the surrounding area. Researchers use the eelpout's larvae sex ratio and reproductive success to determine the presence of pollution in the marine environment.

== Conservation status ==
Pyrolycus jaco is not well known enough to have an official conservation status, as this species is only known from a limited habitat.
