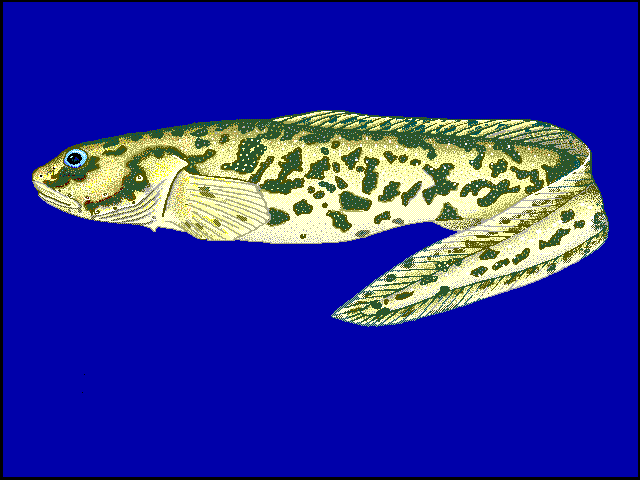
- Lycodichthys antarcticus

Scientific classification
- Kingdom: Animalia
- Phylum: Chordata
- Class: Actinopterygii
- Order: Perciformes
- Family: Zoarcidae
- Subfamily: Lycodinae
- Genus: Lycodichthys; Paul Pappenheim, 1911

Type species
- Lycodichthys antarcticus Pappenheim, 1911

Synonyms
- Rhigophila DeWitt, 1962

= Lycodichthys =

Genus of fishes

Lycodichthys is a genus of marine ray-finned fish belonging to the family Zoarcidae, the eelpouts. They are found in the Southern Ocean.

== Taxonomy ==
Lycodichthys was first proposed as a monospecific genus in 1911 by the German zoologist Paul Pappenheim when he described L. antarcticus giving its type locality as the Gauss winter station on the coast of Kaiser Wilhelm II Land in Antarctica. The American ichthyologist Hugh Hamilton DeWitt described Rhigophila dearbornii in 1962 but in 1988 this taxon was reviewed by the South African based American ichthyologist M. Eric Anderson and reclassified as the second species in Lycodichthys, making Rhigophila as synonym of Lycodichthys. This genus is classified in the subfamily Lycodinae, one of four subfamilies in the family Zoarcidae, the eelpouts.

== Etymology ==
Lycodichthys combines the name of the Northern genus Lycodes with ichthys, meaning "fish", as this genus closely resembles Lycodes in the shape of the body and fins.

== Species ==
Lycodichthys contains the following species:

- Lycodichthys antarcticus Pappenheim, 1911
- Lycodichthys dearborni (DeWitt, 1962)

== Characteristics ==
Lycodichthys eelpouts have robust bodies which have a depth which is equal to 8.4% to 12.7% of their standard length. They have firm, thick skin and both scales and the lateral line are present. Pelvic fins can be either present or absent. There are five suborbital bones and five pores on the head. The gill slit does not typically extend as far as the lower edge of the base of the pectoral fin. There are no vomerine or palatine teeth. Both species within Lycodichthys are similar in size with maximum published of 24 cm (9.4 in) for L. antarcticus and 23 cm (9.1 in) for L. dearbornii.

The evolution of the antifreeze protein in L. dearborni provides a prime example of neofunctionalization after gene duplication. In the case of the Antarctic zoarcid fish type III antifreeze protein gene (AFPIII; P12102) diverged from a paralogous copy of sialic acid synthase (SAS) gene. The ancestral SAS gene was found to have both sialic acid synthase and rudimentary ice-binding functionalities. After duplication one of the paralogs began to accumulate mutations that led to the replacement of SAS domains of the gene allowing for further development and optimization of the antifreeze functionality. The new gene is now capable of noncolligative freezing-point depression, and thus is neofunctionalized. This specialization allows Antarctic zoarcid fish to survive in the frigid temperatures of the Antarctic Seas.

== Distribution and habitat ==
Lycodichthys are endemic to the waters of the Southern Ocean off Antarctica, L. antarcticus occurs from the northern tip of the Antarctic Peninsula east as far as Wilkes Land being found at depths between 195 and 540 m (640 and 1,772 ft) while L. dearborni has only been recorded from the Ross Sea at depths between 550 and 588 m (1,804 and 1,929 ft),
