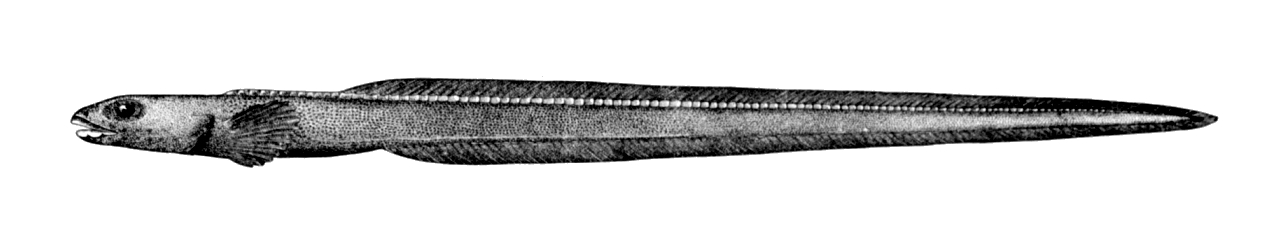
- Lycodonus mirabilis

Scientific classification
- Kingdom: Animalia
- Phylum: Chordata
- Class: Actinopterygii
- Order: Perciformes
- Family: Zoarcidae
- Subfamily: Lycodinae
- Genus: Lycodonus; Goode & T. H. Bean, 1883

Type species
- Lycodonus mirabilis Goode & T. H. Bean, 1883

= Lycodonus =

Genus of eelpouts

Lycodonus is a genus of marine ray-finned fish belonging to the family Zoarcidae, the eelpouts. The species in this genus are found in the North and Southern Atlantic Ocean. These fishes are sometimes called scutepouts.

== Taxonomy ==
Lycodonus was first proposed as a monospecific genus in 1883 by the American ichthyologists George Brown Goode and Tarleton Hoffman Bean when they described Lycodonus mirabilis, its type locality being given as in the Atlantic Ocean at 38°20'08"N, 73°23'20"W at a depth of 740 fathoms (1,350 m). This genus is classified in the subfamily Lycodinae, one of four subfamilies in the family Zoarcidae, the eelpouts.

== Etymology ==
Lycodonus is made up of the genus name Lycodes, as these fishes bear a strong resemblance to the fishes in that genus, and adds a meaningless suffix, onus.

== Species ==
Lycodonus contains the following species:

- Lycodonus flagellicauda (Jensen, 1902)
- Lycodonus malvinensis Gosztonyi, 1981
- Lycodonus mirabilis Goode & T. H. Bean, 1883
- Lycodonus vermiformis Barnard, 1927

== Characteristics ==
Lycodonus eelpouts have between 7 and 9 suborbital bones with a sensory canal between 6 and 8 pores. The pterygiophores in both the dorsal and anal fins have widened upper areas which form scutes at the base of these fins. They possess a pseudobranch, pyloric caeca, pelvic fins, lateral line and teeth on both the vomerine and palatine. The smallest species is L. malvinensis with a maximum published total length of 19.6 cm (7.7 in) while the largest is L. mirabilis which has a maximum published total length of 30.2 cm (11.9 in).

== Distribution and habitat ==
Lycodonus eelpouys are found in the Atlantic Ocean. The whiptail scutepout (L. flagellicauda) is found in the northeastern Atlantic and nearby Arctic Ocean while the chevron scutepout (L. mirabilis) is found in the northwestern Atlantic and adjacent Arctic Ocean. There are also 2 species in the South Atlantic, L. malvinensis in the southwestern Atlantic and L. vermiformis in the southeastern Atlantic, with the only known specimens being collected off Cape Point in South Africa. These fishes are bathydemersal being found at great depths, in subzero temperatures on muddy substrates.
