= Bothrocarina =

Scientific classification
- Kingdom: Animalia
- Phylum: Chordata
- Class: Actinopterygii
- Order: Perciformes
- Family: Zoarcidae
- Subfamily: Lycodinae
- Genus: Bothrocarina; Evgeni Suvorov, 1935

Type species
- Bothrocarina nigrocaudata Suvorov, 1935

Genus of fishes

Bothrocarina is a genus of marine ray-finned fishes belonging to the family Zoarcidae, the eelpouts. The two species in this genus are found in the Northwestern Pacific Ocean.

== Taxonomy ==
Bothrocarina was first proposed as a monospecific genus in 1935 by the Soviet zoologist Evgeni Suvorov when he described the new species Bothrocarina nigrocaudata from the Okhotsk Sea. This genus is classified within the subfamily Lycodinae, one of 4 subfamilies in the family Zoarcidae, the eelpouts. This genus is the sister taxon to Bothrocara, Lycodapus and Lycogrammoides, and these four genera form a clade within the subfamily Lycodinae.

== Species ==
Bothrocarina contains the following species:

- Bothrocarina microcephala (Schmidt, 1938)
- Bothrocarina nigrocaudata Evgeni Suvorov, 1935
