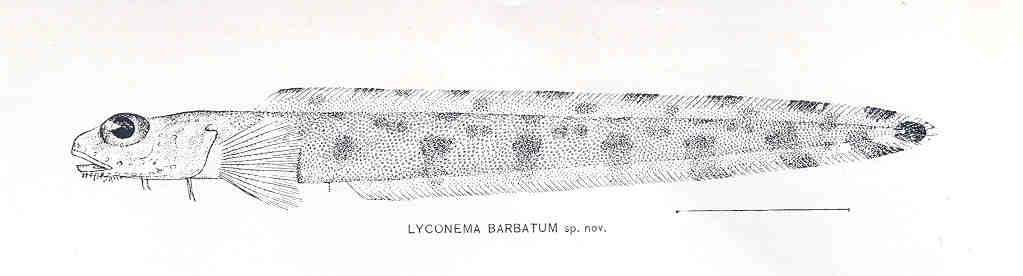

Scientific classification
- Kingdom: Animalia
- Phylum: Chordata
- Class: Actinopterygii
- Order: Perciformes
- Family: Zoarcidae
- Subfamily: Lycodinae
- Genus: Lyconema; Gilbert, 1896
- Species: L. barbatum

Binomial name
- Lyconema barbatum Gilbert, 1896

= Bearded eelpout =

Species of marine ray-finned fish

The bearded eelpout (Lyconema barbatum) is a species of marine ray-finned fish belonging to the family Zoarcidae, the eelpouts. This species is the only species in the monospecific genus Lyconema. It is found in the eastern Pacific Ocean.

== Taxonomy ==
The bearded eelpout was first formally described in 1896 by the American ichthyologist Charles Henry Gilbert with its type locality given as off central California. Gilbert also described a new monospecific genus, Lyconema, when he described the bearded eelpout. This taxon is classified within the subfamily Lycodinae, one of 4 subfamilies in the family Zoarcidae, the eelpouts.

== Etymology ==
The bearded eelpout's genus name is a combination of lyco, in reference to Lycodes, meaning that this taxonm is similar to that one, but has its lower jaw furnishes with a dense mass of slender filaments or barbels, nema meaning thread. The specific name barbatum means "bearded" in another allusion to the filaments on the lower jaw.

== Description ==
The bearded eelpout has 9 or 10 suborbital bones and a cephalic sensory canal with 9 pores. There are 2 parallel lines of cirri on the lower jaw and. in adults, these often extend back as far as the branchiostegal region. They have 2 fin rays in the pelvic fin. The body is covered in small scales, there are two small pyloric caecae and a lateral line. There are small on sexually dimorphic teeth in the jaws and there are vomerine teeth and palatine teeth. This species attains a maximum published total length of 17 cm (6.7 in).

== Distribution and habitat ==
The bearded eelpout is found in the eastern Pacific Ocean from off southern Oregon south to central Baja California, Mexico. It is a demersal fish found at depths between 82 and 373 m (269 and 1,224 ft) over soft substrates consisting of mud or a mix of sand and mud.
