= Krusensterniella =

Scientific classification
- Kingdom: Animalia
- Phylum: Chordata
- Class: Actinopterygii
- Order: Perciformes
- Family: Zoarcidae
- Subfamily: Gymnelinae
- Genus: Krusensterniella; Schmidt, 1904

Type species
- Krusensterniella notabilis Schmidt, 1904

Genus of fishes

Krusensterniella is a genus of marine ray-finned fishes belonging to the family Zoarcidae, the eelpouts. The fishes in this genus are found in the northwestern Pacific Ocean.

== Species ==
The following species are classified within the genus Krusensterniella:

- Krusensterniella maculata Andriashev, 1938
- Krusensterniella multispinosa Soldatov 1922
- Krusensterniella notabilis Schmidt, 1904
- Krusensterniella pavlovskii Andriashev 1955
