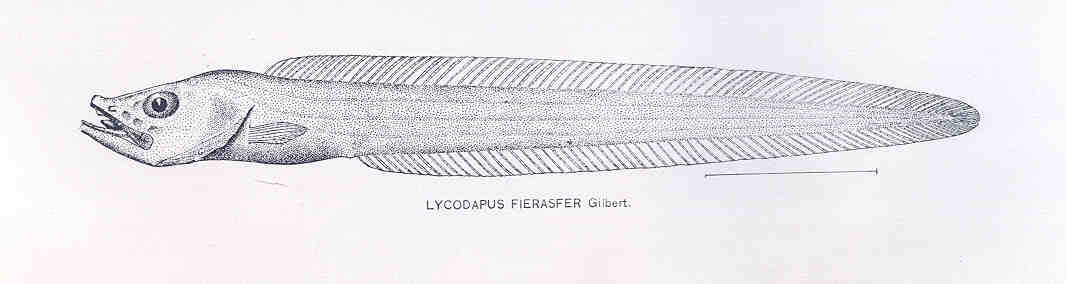
- Lycodapus fierasfer

Scientific classification
- Kingdom: Animalia
- Phylum: Chordata
- Class: Actinopterygii
- Order: Perciformes
- Family: Zoarcidae
- Subfamily: Lycodinae
- Genus: Lycodapus; Gilbert, 1890

Type species
- Lycodapus fierasfer Gilbert, 1890

= Lycodapus =

Genus of fishes

Lycodapus is a genus of marine ray-finned fishes belonging to the family Zoarcidae, the eelpouts. The species in this genus are found in the Pacific and Southern Oceans.

== Taxonomy ==
Lycodapus was first proposed as a monospecific genus in 1890 by the American ichthyologist Charles Henry Gilbert when he described Lycodapus fierasfer from the Gulf of California. This genus is classified within the subfamily Lycodinae, one of 4 subfamilies in the family Zoarcidae, the eelpouts. This genus is the sister taxon to Bothrocara, Bothrocarina and Lycogrammoides, and these four genera form a clade within the subfamily Lycodinae.

== Etymology ==
Lycodapus is a compound of the Greek word or "wolf", lykos, a reference to the type genus of the Lycodinae, and apous, which means "without feet", an allusion to the lack of pelvic fins in this genus.

== Species ==
Lycodapus contains the following species:

- Lycodapus antarcticus Tomo, 1982
- Lycodapus australis Norman, 1937
- Lycodapus derjugini Andriashev, 1935
- Lycodapus dermatinus Gilbert, 1896
- Lycodapus endemoscotus Peden & M. E. Anderson, 1978
- Lycodapus fierasfer Gilbert, 1890
- Lycodapus leptus Peden & M. E. Anderson, 1981
- Lycodapus mandibularis Gilbert, 1915
- Lycodapus microchir Schmidt, 1950
- Lycodapus pachysoma Peden & M. E. Anderson, 1978
- Lycodapus parviceps Gilbert, 1896
- Lycodapus poecilus Peden & M. E. Anderson, 1981
- Lycodapus psarostomatus Peden & M. E. Anderson, 1981

== Characteristics ==
Lycodapus eelpouts have bodies which vary from slender to robust, the depth varying between 3.2% to 10% of the standard length. They may have transparent, gelatinous or opaque skin with no scales present. There are also no oral valve, occipital pores or pelvic fins. The only suborbital bone present is the lacrimal. The gill slit is not joined to the isthmus to its rear. The flesh is gelatinous. In males the front teeth in the jaw are canine like. The pseudobranch, vomerine and palatine teeth are normally present. The pectoral fin has between 5 and 9 rays. These are small eelpouts, some of which are mature at lengths of 120 mm (4.7 in). The largest species is Lycodapus antatcticus which has a maximum published total length of 22.5 cm (8.9 in).

== Distribution and habitat ==
Lycodapus eelpouts are found mainly in the eastern Pacific Ocean with some species extending into the Bering Sea and western North Pacific Oceans and others extending into the Southern Ocean. They appear to be mesopelagic fishes with most specimens being collected in open nets. There is also some evidence for diel vertical migration which has been described for Lycodapus mandibularis.
