= White-line eelpout =

Scientific classification
- Kingdom: Animalia
- Phylum: Chordata
- Class: Actinopterygii
- Order: Perciformes
- Family: Zoarcidae
- Subfamily: Lycodinae
- Genus: Leucogrammolycus; Mincorone & M. E. Anderson, 2008
- Species: L. brychios

Binomial name
- Leucogrammolycus brychios Mincarone & M. E. Anderson, 2008

Species of fish

The white-line eelpout (Leucogrammolycus brychios) is a species of marine ray-finned fish belonging to the family Zoarcidae, the eelpouts. It is the only species in the monospecific genus Leucogrammolycus. This species is found in the southwest Atlantic Ocean off Brazil on reefs at depths of between 490 and 632 m (1,608 and 2,073 ft).
