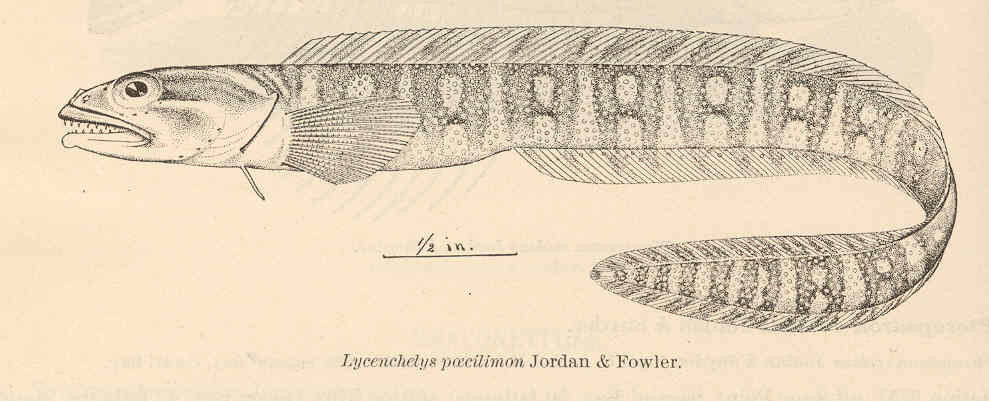
- Davidijordania poecilimon

Scientific classification
- Kingdom: Animalia
- Phylum: Chordata
- Class: Actinopterygii
- Order: Perciformes
- Family: Zoarcidae
- Subfamily: Gymnelinae
- Genus: Davidijordania; Popov, 1931

Type species
- Lycenchelys lacertinus Pavlenko, 1910

= Davidijordania =

Genus of fishes

Davidijordania is a genus of marine ray-finned fishes belonging to the family Zoarcidae, the eelpouts. The fishes in this genus are found in the northwestern Pacific Ocean.

== Taxonomy ==
Davidiordania was first proposed as a genus in 1931 by the Soviet biologist Alexander Mikhailovich Popov with Lycenchelys lacertinus, which had been described from Peter the Great Bay in Russia by Mikhail Nikolaevich Pavlenko in 1910, designated as its type species. The genus is placed in the subfamily Gymnelinae of the eelpout family, Zoarcidae. The genus name honours the American ichthyologist David Starr Jordan who was renowned for his work on the fishes of the Pacific Ocean.

== Species ==
The following species are classified within the genus Davidijordania:

- Davidijordania brachyrhynchus (Schmidt, 1904)
- Davidijordania jordaniana Schmidt, 1936
- Davidijordania lacertina (Pavlenko, 1910)
- Davidijordania poecilimon (Jordan & Fowler, 1902)
- Davidijordania yabei Anderson & Imamura, 2008
