= Dieidolycus =

Scientific classification
- Kingdom: Animalia
- Phylum: Chordata
- Class: Actinopterygii
- Order: Perciformes
- Suborder: Zoarcoidei
- Family: Zoarcidae
- Subfamily: Lycodinae
- Genus: Dieidolycus; Anderson, 1988

Type species
- Dieidolycus leptodermatus Anderson, 1988

Genus of fishes

Dieidolycus is a genus of marine ray-finned fishes belonging to the family Zoarcidae, the eelpouts. The genus comprises three species which are found in the western central Pacific, southeastern Pacific and Southern Oceans.

== Taxonomy ==
Dieidolycus was first proposed as a monospecific genus in 1988 by the South Africa based American ichthyologist M. Eric Anderson when he described its type species Dieidolycus leptodermatus, with its type locality given as south of South Georgia in the Scotia Sea at 55°01'-10'S, 39°55'-46'W, and from a depth of 2,886–3,040 m (9,469–9,974 ft). This genus is classified within the subfamily Lycodinae, one of 4 subfamilies in the family Zoarcidae, the eelpouts. This genus is apparently related to the clade which includes the genera Lycodes and Lycenchelys, sometimes called the Lycodini, but its derived characters, adaptations for deep sea life led it to be classified as a separate genus.

== Species ==
Dieidolycus has three species:

- Dieidolycus adocetus Anderson, 1994
- Dieidolycus gosztonyii Anderson & Pequeño, 1998
- Dieidolycus leptodermatus Anderson, 1988

== Characteristics ==
Deiedolycus eelpouts have robust bodies which have a depth that is roughly 10% of their standard length. The skin is gelatinous and transparent and the muscles, bones and fin rays are clearly visible through the skin. They have no scales or lateral lines, although the sensory pores on the head are enlarged. The gills slit reaches vertically to the middle of the base of the pectoral fin. The only measurement published is of D. leptodermatus which gives its maximum total length of 16.6 cm (6.5 in).

== Distribution and habitat ==
Deiedolycus eelpouts are bathydemersal fishes found in the Pacific Ocean. D. leptodermatus Is found in the Southern Ocean, D. gosztonyii is found in the southeastern Pacific off Chile and D. adocetus in the Bismarck Sea.
