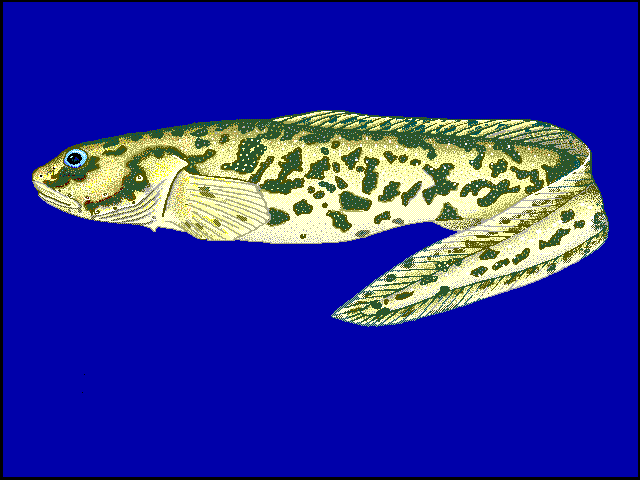
- An L. antarcticus habitus drawing.

Scientific classification
- Kingdom: Animalia
- Phylum: Chordata
- Class: Actinopterygii
- Order: Perciformes
- Family: Zoarcidae
- Genus: Lycodichthys
- Species: L. antarcticus

Binomial name
- Lycodichthys antarcticus Pappenheim, 1911

= Lycodichthys antarcticus =

Species of fish

Lycodichthys antarcticus is a species of fish of the family Zoarcidae. It occurs in the Southern Ocean. It grows to 24 cm (9.4 in) total length.
