= Pogonolycus elegans =

Scientific classification
- Kingdom: Animalia
- Phylum: Chordata
- Class: Actinopterygii
- Order: Perciformes
- Family: Zoarcidae
- Genus: Pogonolycus
- Species: P. elegans

Binomial name
- Pogonolycus elegans Norman, 1937

Species of fish

Pogonolycus elegans is a species of eelpouts (Perciformes fish in the family Zoarcidae). It is the type species of its genus. It is found in the Southeast Pacific and Southwest Atlantic.
