= Andriashevia =

Scientific classification
- Kingdom: Animalia
- Phylum: Chordata
- Class: Actinopterygii
- Order: Perciformes
- Family: Zoarcidae
- Subfamily: Gymnelinae
- Genus: Andriashevia; Fedorov & Neelov, 1978
- Species: A. aptera

Binomial name
- Andriashevia aptera Fedorov & Neelov, 1978

Genus of fishes

Andriashevia is a monospecific genus of marine ray-finned fish belonging to the subfamiy Gymnelinae of the family Zoarcidae, the eelpouts, its only species is Andriasheevia aptera. It is found in the northwestern Pacific Ocean, where it occurs off the Pacific coast of Japan. It appears to be a demersal fish which is associated with large red gorgonian corals, e.g. Paragorgia. Examinations of the stomach contents of collected specimens has shown that its diet is mainly crustaceans but it likely also feeds on encrusting invertebrates which it searches for among coral branches and the hard substrates they live in. This species attains a maximum published standard length of 19.3 cm (7.6 in). Unlike other species in the subfamily Gymnelinae, this taxon has no pectoral fins. The genus name honours the Soviet ichthyologist Anatoly Petrovich Andriashev for his work on fishes of the Russian Far East and especially eelpouts. The specific name, aptera means "without wings" and refers to the absence of pectoral fins.

In 2020 a second species in the genus, Andriashevia natsushimae, was described from Sagami Bay, Japan, but this species was not included in FishBase as of June 2022.
