= Puzanovia =

Scientific classification
- Kingdom: Animalia
- Phylum: Chordata
- Class: Actinopterygii
- Order: Perciformes
- Family: Zoarcidae
- Subfamily: Gymnelinae
- Genus: Puzanovia; Fedorov, 1975

Type species
- Puzanovia rubra Federov, 1975

Genus of fishes

Puzanovia is a genus of marine ray-finned fishes belonging to the family Zoarcidae, the eelpouts. The fishes in this genus are found in the northwestern Pacific Ocean.

== Species ==
The following species are classified within the genus Puzanovia:

- Puzanovia rubra Fedorov, 1975
- Puzanovia virgata Fedorov, 1982
