= Opaeophacus =

Scientific classification
- Kingdom: Animalia
- Phylum: Chordata
- Class: Actinopterygii
- Order: Perciformes
- Family: Zoarcidae
- Subfamily: Gymnelinae
- Genus: Opaeophacus; Bond & Stein, 1984
- Species: O. acrogeneius

Binomial name
- Opaeophacus acrogeneius Bond & Stein, 1984

Species of fish

Opaeophacus is a monospecific genus belonging to the family Zoarcidae, the eelpouts. Its only species is Opaeophacus acrogeneius which is found in the Bering Sea.
