= Seleniolycus =

Scientific classification
- Kingdom: Animalia
- Phylum: Chordata
- Class: Actinopterygii
- Order: Perciformes
- Family: Zoarcidae
- Subfamily: Gymnelinae
- Genus: Seleniolycus; Anderson, 1988

Type species
- Oidiphorus laevifasciatus Torno, Tomo & Marschoff, 1977

Species
- 3, see text

Genus of fishes

Seleniolycus is a genus of marine ray-finned fishes belonging to the family Zoarcidae, the eelpouts. The fishes in this genus are found in the Southern Ocean.

== Species ==
The following species are classified within the genus Seleniolycus:

- Seleniolycus laevifasciatus (Torno, Tomo & Marschoff, 1977)
- Seleniolycus pectoralis Møller & Stewart, 2006
- Seleniolycus robertsi Møller & Stewart, 2006
