= Pyrolycus =

Scientific classification
- Kingdom: Animalia
- Phylum: Chordata
- Class: Actinopterygii
- Order: Perciformes
- Family: Zoarcidae
- Subfamily: Lycodinae
- Genus: Pyrolycus; Machida & Hashimoto, 2002

Type species
- Pyrolycus manusanus Machida & Hashimoto, 2002

Genus of marine ray-finned fishes

Pyrolycus is a genus of marine ray-finned fishes belonging to the subfamily Lycodinae, the eelpouts, within the family Zoarcidae. The genus was first described in 2002 by Japanese ichthyologists Yoshihiko Machida and Jun Hashimoto. The type species is P. manusanus, which was discovered in the Manus Basin off Papua New Guinea.

== Etymology ==
The genus name Pyrolycus is derived from the Greek words "pyr" (fire) and "lykos" (wolf), referring to the type locality of the genus near hydrothermal vents and the predatory nature of these fishes.

== Distribution and habitat ==
Species of Pyrolycus are found in deep waters of the Pacific Ocean, typically associated with hydrothermal vents or cold seeps.

== Description ==
Pyrolycus species have elongated, eel-like bodies with a single, long dorsal fin and a shorter anal fin. The pelvic fins are absent, and the pectoral fins are small. They have large heads with blunt snouts and thick, fleshy lips. The teeth are small and conical, arranged in multiple rows on the jaws and vomer.

== Species ==
Pyrolycus contains 3 species:

- Pyrolycus manusanus Machida & Hashimoto, 2002
- Pyrolycus moelleri M. E. Anderson, 2006
- Pyrolycus jaco Frable, Seid, Bronson, & Møller, 2023

== Biology and ecology ==
Little is known about the biology and ecology of Pyrolycus species due to their deep-sea habitats and rarity. They are thought to be predators, feeding on small invertebrates and possibly scavenging on the carcasses of larger animals. The presence of these fishes near hydrothermal vents and cold seeps indicates that they might depend on chemosynthetic bacteria.
