= Gosztonyia =

Scientific classification
- Kingdom: Animalia
- Phylum: Chordata
- Class: Actinopterygii
- Order: Perciformes
- Family: Zoarcidae
- Subfamily: Lycodinae
- Genus: Gosztonyia; Matallanas, 2008
- Species: G. antarctica

Binomial name
- Gosztonyia antarctica Matallanas, 2008

Species of fish

Gosztonyia is a monospecific genus of marine ray-finned fish belonging to the family Zoarcidae, the eelpouts. The only species in the genus is Gosztonyia antarctica which is known only from the Bellingshausen Sea of Antarctica.
