= Santelmoa =

Scientific classification
- Kingdom: Animalia
- Phylum: Chordata
- Class: Actinopterygii
- Order: Perciformes
- Family: Zoarcidae
- Subfamily: Lycodinae
- Genus: Santelmoa; Matallanas, 2010

Type species
- Santelmoa carmenae Matallanas 2010

Genus of fishes

Santelmoa is a genus of marine ray-finned fishes belongong to the family Zoarcidae, the eelpouts. The species in this genus are found in the Antarctic in the Southern Ocean and Atlantic Ocean.

== Species ==
Santelmoa contains 4 species:

- Santelmoa antarctica Matallanas, Corbella & Møller, 2012
- Santelmoa carmenae Matallanas, 2010
- Santelmoa elvirae Matallanas, 2011
- Santelmoa fusca Matallanas, Corbella & Møller, 2012
