= Gymnelopsis =

Scientific classification
- Kingdom: Animalia
- Phylum: Chordata
- Class: Actinopterygii
- Order: Perciformes
- Family: Zoarcidae
- Subfamily: Gymnelinae
- Genus: Gymnelopsis; Soldatov, 1922

Type species
- Gymnelopsis ocellatus Soldatov 1922

Synonyms
- Derjuginia Popov 1931; Gengea Katayama, 1943

Genus of fishes

Gymnelopsis is a genus of marine ray-finned fishes belonging to the family Zoarcidae, the eelpouts. The fishes in this genus are found in the northwestern Pacific Ocean.

== Species ==
The following species are classified within the genus Gymnelopsis:

- Gymnelopsis brashnikovi Soldatov, 1922
- Gymnelopsis brevifenestrata Anderson, 1982
- Gymnelopsis humilis Nazarkin & Chernova, 2003
- Gymnelopsis ocellata Soldatov, 1922
- Gymnelopsis ochotensis (Popov, 1931)

Gymnelopsis japonica (Katayama 1943) is recognised as a valid species by the Catalog of Fishes but is not included in FishBase.
