= Magadanichthys =

Scientific classification
- Kingdom: Animalia
- Phylum: Chordata
- Class: Actinopterygii
- Order: Perciformes
- Family: Zoarcidae
- Genus: Magadanichthys; Shinohara, Nazarkin & Chereshnev 2006
- Species: M. skopetsi

Binomial name
- Magadanichthys skopetsi (Shinohara, Nazarkin & Chereshnev, 2004)

Synonyms
- Magadania skopetsi Shinohara, Nazarkin & Chereshnev 2004

Genus of fishes

Magadanichthys is a monospecific genus of marine ray-finned fish. Its only species is Magadanichthys skopetsi which is found in the northwestern Pacific Ocean off the Russian Far East.

Magadanichthys skopetsi is a small fish species belonging to the family Zoarcidae. It is characterized by its eel-shaped body, which is strongly compressed from the sides in the caudal part, along with long dorsal and anal fins. The general coloration of its head and body is brownish-brown, with a distinctive pattern of oblique, wavy spots and stripes on the dorsal fin. Additionally, the anterior part of the fin displays 1 to 4 black spots with a light rim.

== Taxonomy and Discovery ==
First described by Shinohara, Nazarkin, and Chereshnev in 2004, Magadanichthys belongs to the subfamily Gymnelinae within the family Zoarcidae. It was discovered during a Japan–Russia Joint Research Expedition conducted between 1997 and 1999, aimed at investigating the biodiversity of littoral fishes in the Far East Region of Russia. The genus and species were initially identified based on external morphology and habitat similarities to Hadropareia middendorfii Schmidt, 1904.
