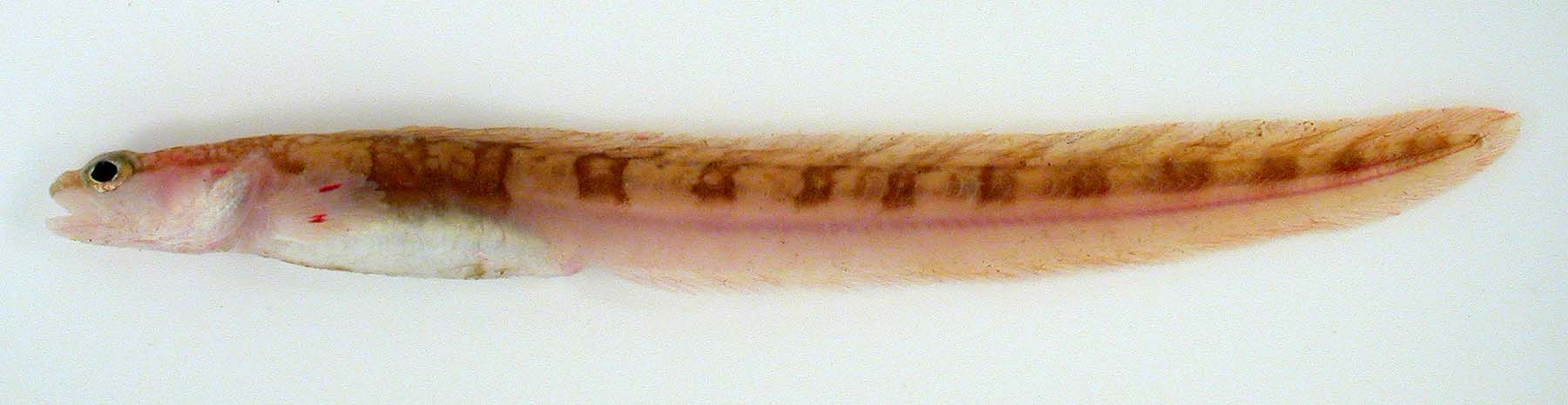
- Gymnelus hemifasciatus

Scientific classification
- Kingdom: Animalia
- Phylum: Chordata
- Class: Actinopterygii
- Order: Perciformes
- Family: Zoarcidae
- Subfamily: Gymnelinae
- Genus: Gymnelus; J. C. H. Reinhardt, 1834

Type species
- Ophidium viride Fabricius, 1780

= Gymnelus =

Genus of fishes

Gymnelus is a genus of small fish in the family Zoarcidae found in the Arctic Ocean, and adjacent parts of the North Pacific and North Atlantic. They are highly variable in color, which has resulted in the description of several taxa now considered invalid.

== Species ==
There are currently eleven recognized species in this genus:

- Gymnelus andersoni Chernova, 1998
- Gymnelus diporus Chernova, 2000
- Gymnelus gracilis Chernova, 2000
- Gymnelus hemifasciatus Andriashev, 1937 (Halfbarred pout)
- Gymnelus obscurus Chernova, 2000
- Gymnelus pauciporus Anderson, 1982
- Gymnelus popovi (Taranetz & Andriashev, 1935) (Aleutian pout) – often in monotypic genus Commandorella
- Gymnelus retrodorsalis Le Danois, 1913 (Aurora unernak)
- Gymnelus soldatovi Chernova, 2000
- Gymnelus taeniatus Chernova, 1999
- Gymnelus viridis J. C. Fabricius, 1780 (Fish doctor)

Many of the above species described in this genus are regarded as synonyms by some authorities (G. hemifasciatus with synonyms G. diporus, G. knipowitschi and G. soldatovi; G. retrodorsalis with synonyms G. andersoni, G. esipovi and G. taeniatus; and G. viridis with synonyms G. barsukovi, G. bilabrus, G. gracilis, G. obscurus and G. platycephalus).
