= Oidiphorus =

Scientific classification
- Kingdom: Animalia
- Phylum: Chordata
- Class: Actinopterygii
- Order: Perciformes
- Family: Zoarcidae
- Subfamily: Lycodinae
- Genus: Oidiphorus; McAllister & Rees, 1964

Type species
- Maynea brevis Norman, 1937

Genus of marine ray-finned fishes

Oidiphorus is a small genus of marine ray-finned fishes belonging to the family Zoarcidae, the eelpouts. Its two species are found in the southwestern Atlantic Ocean and the Southern Ocean.

== Species ==
Oidiphorus contains 2 species:

- Oidiphorus brevis (Norman, 1937)
- Oidiphorus mcallisteri Anderson, 1988
