= Patagolycus =

Scientific classification
- Kingdom: Animalia
- Phylum: Chordata
- Class: Actinopterygii
- Order: Perciformes
- Family: Zoarcidae
- Subfamily: Lycodinae
- Genus: Patagolycus; Matallanas & Corbella, 2012, 2012
- Species: P. melastomus

Binomial name
- Patagolycus melastomus Matallanas & Corbella, 2012

Monospecific genus of marine ray-finned fish

Patagolycus is a monospecific genus of marine ray-finned fish belonging to the family Zoarcidae, the eelpouts. Its only species is Patagolycus melastomus which is found in the southwestern Atlantic Ocean.
