= Hadropogonichthys =

Scientific classification
- Kingdom: Animalia
- Phylum: Chordata
- Class: Actinopterygii
- Order: Perciformes
- Family: Zoarcidae
- Subfamily: Lycodinae
- Genus: Hadropogonichthys; Fedorov, 1982

Genus of fish

Hadropogonichthys is a genus of marine ray-finned fish belonging to the family Zoarcidae, the eelpouts.

The genus was erected in 1982 by the Soviet zoologist Vladimir Vladimirovich Fedorov when he described Hadropogonichthys lindbergi from the Kuril Islands. In 2004, a second species was described, H. leptopus from Japan but this has not yet been included in Fishbase.

Species

- Hadropogonichthys leptopus Machida, Shinohara & Ohta, 2004
- Hadropogonichthys lindbergi Fedorov, 1982
