= Moose eelpout =

Scientific classification
- Domain: Eukaryota
- Kingdom: Animalia
- Phylum: Chordata
- Class: Actinopterygii
- Order: Perciformes
- Family: Zoarcidae
- Subfamily: Gymnelinae
- Genus: Barbapellis; Iglésias, Dettai & Ozouf-Costaz, 2012
- Species: B. pterygalces

Binomial name
- Barbapellis pterygalces Iglésias, Dettai & Ozouf-Costaz, 2012

Species of fish

The moose eelpout (Barbapellis pterygalces) is a species of zoarcid fish found in Southern Ocean. This species is only known from a single adult female specimen from off Terre Adélie. This species is the only known member of its genus.
