= Melanostigma =

Scientific classification
- Kingdom: Animalia
- Phylum: Chordata
- Class: Actinopterygii
- Order: Perciformes
- Family: Zoarcidae
- Subfamily: Gymnelinae
- Genus: Melanostigma; Günther, 1881

Type species
- Melanostigma gelatinosum Günther, 1881

Synonyms
- Bandichthys Parin, 1980

Melanostigma is a cosmopolitan genus of marine ray-finned fishes belonging to the family Zoarcidae, the eelpouts. The fishes in this genus are found all round the world.

== Species ==
The following species are classified within the genus Melanostigma:

- Melanostigma atlanticum Koefoed, 1952
- Melanostigma bathium Bussing, 1965
- Melanostigma bellingshauseni Orlovskaya & Balushkin, 2020
- Melanostigma gelatinosum Günther, 1881
- Melanostigma inexpectatum Parin, 1977
- Melanostigma kharini Balushkin & Moganova, 2018
- Melanostigma orientale Tominaga, 1971
- Melanostigma pammelas Gilbert, 1896
- Melanostigma vitiazi Parin, 1980

In addition Catalog of Fishes recognises the following additional species which are not recognised as valid species in FishBase.

- Melanostigma flaccidum Waite, 1914
- Melanostigma japonicum Balushkin, 2019
- Melanostigma lazarevi Orlovskaya & Balushkin, 2020
- Melanostigma meteori Balushkin & Orlovskaya, 2019
- Melanostigma olgae Balushkin & Moganova, 2017
- Melanostigma thalassium Orlovskaya & Balushkin 2019
