= Cuskpout =

Scientific classification
- Kingdom: Animalia
- Phylum: Chordata
- Class: Actinopterygii
- Order: Perciformes
- Family: Zoarcidae
- Subfamily: Lycodinae
- Genus: Derepodichthys; Gilbert, 1896
- Species: D. alepidotus

Binomial name
- Derepodichthys alepidotus Gilbert, 1896

Species of fish

The cuskpout (Derepodichthys alepidotus) is a species of marine ray-finned fish belonging to the family Zoarcidae, the eelpouts. It is the only species in the monospecific genus Derepodichthys and is found in the eastern North Pacific Ocean.

== Taxonomy ==
The cuskpout was first formally described in 1896 by the American ichthyologist Charles Henry Gilbert with its type locality given as off Queen Charlotte Island in British Columbia. Gilbert placed his new species in a new monospecific genus Derepodichthys. It was originally considered to be a taxonomically unique species and was classified in the monotypic family Derepodichthyidae, which was thought to be intermediate between the eelpouts and the cusk eels in the family Ophidiidae. It was only known from the holotype but further specimens were collected between the 1960s and 1980s which allowed it to be redescribed by M. Eric Anderson and Carl Leavitt Hubbs who reclassified this taxon as incertae sedis within the Zoarcidae. Its position in the Zoarcidae was later determined to be within the subfamily Lycodinae.

== Etymology ==
The cuskpout's genus name is a combination of dere, which means "neck" or "throat", with "pous", meaning "foot," an allusions to the pelvic fins being reduced to a thin, unbranched filament, both starting from a base which juts out and which is situated well forward, underneath the eye, and this is suffixed with ichthys, meaning "fish". The specific name, alepidotus prefixes a, meaning "without", on lepidotus which means "scaly", alluding to scaleless body which also lacks a lateral line.

== Distribution and habitat ==
The cuskpout is found in the eastern Pacific Ocean from the Queen Charlotte Islands of British Columbia south to central California. It is a bathydemersal species found at depths between 1,000 and 2,904 m (3,281 and 9,528 ft).

== Biology ==
The cuskpout has soft, gelatinous flesh and a fragile skeleton and these features are thought to mean that it is not a fish that burrows into the sediment. Instead, it is likely that it swims close to the substrate using its long pelvic fins to search the sediment for prey. In the examination of the contents of two stomachs the diet was found to be dominated by polychaetes. They would appear to have a low fecundity with females carrying around 25 large orange eggs.
