= Ctenotus colletti =

Conservation status
- Least Concern (IUCN 3.1)

Scientific classification
- Kingdom: Animalia
- Phylum: Chordata
- Class: Reptilia
- Order: Squamata
- Family: Scincidae
- Genus: Ctenotus
- Species: C. colletti

Binomial name
- Ctenotus colletti (Boulenger, 1896)

Synonyms
- Lygosoma colletti Boulenger, 1896; Lygosoma (Sphenomorphus) colletti — Glauert, 1960; Ctenotus colletti — Cogger, 1983

Species of lizard

Ctenotus colletti, also known commonly as the buff-tailed finesnout ctenotus, Collett's ctenotus, and Collett's skink, is a species of lizard in the family Scincidae. The species is endemic to Australia.

== Etymology ==
The specific name, colletti, is in honor of Norwegian zoologist Robert Collett.

== Geographic range ==
Within Australia C. colletti is found in the Northern Territory and Western Australia,.

== Habitat ==
The preferred natural habitat of C. colletti is shrubland.

== Reproduction ==
C. colletti is oviparous.
