= Crossostomus =

Scientific classification
- Kingdom: Animalia
- Phylum: Chordata
- Class: Actinopterygii
- Order: Perciformes
- Family: Zoarcidae
- Subfamily: Lycodinae
- Genus: Crossostomus; Lahille, 1908

Type species
- Lycodes (Iluocoetes) fimbriatus Steindachner, 1898

Genus of fishes

Crossostomus is a genus of marine ray-finned fishes belonging to the family Zoarcidae, the eelpouts. They are found in the southeastern Pacific Ocean and the southwestern Atlantic Ocean.

== Species ==
Crossostomus has two valid species within it:

- Crossostomus chilensis (Regan, 1913)
- Crossostomus fasciatus (Lönnberg, 1905)
