= Plesienchelys =

Scientific classification
- Kingdom: Animalia
- Phylum: Chordata
- Class: Actinopterygii
- Order: Perciformes
- Family: Zoarcidae
- Subfamily: Lycodinae
- Genus: Plesienchelys (Gosztonyi, 1977)
- Species: P. stehmanni

Binomial name
- Plesienchelys stehmanni M. E. Anderson, 1988

Monospecific genus of marine ray-finned fish

Plesienchelys is a monospecific genus of marine ray-finned fish belonging to the family Zoarcidae, the eelpouts. Its only species is Plesienchelys stehmanni, which is found in the southwestern Atlantic Ocean from the Río de la Plata to the Falkland Islands.
