= Argentinolycus =

Conservation status
- Least Concern (IUCN 3.1)

Scientific classification
- Kingdom: Animalia
- Phylum: Chordata
- Class: Actinopterygii
- Order: Perciformes
- Family: Zoarcidae
- Subfamily: Lycodinae
- Genus: Argentinolycus; Matallanas & Corbella, 2012
- Species: A. elongatus

Binomial name
- Argentinolycus elongatus (Smitt, 1898)

Synonyms
- Phucocoetes variegatus f. elongatus Smitt, 1898; Iluocoetes elongatus (Smitt, 1898); Phucocoetes variegatus f. micropus Smitt, 1898; Phucocoetes variegatus f. effusus Smitt, 1898

Genus of fishes

Argentinolycus is a monospecific genus of marine ray-finned fish belonging to the family Zoarcidae, the eelpouts. Its only species is Argentinolycus elongatus which is found in coastal southern eastern South America.

== Taxonomy ==
Argentinolycus Was first proposed as a monotypic genus in 2012 by the Argentinian zoologists Jesús Matallanas and Cecília Corbella. Its only species, Argentinolycus elongatus, was originally described in 1898 as Phucocoetes variegatus forma elongatus by the Swedish zoologist Fredrik Adam Smitt who gave Puerto Madryn in Argentina as the type locality. when this species was moved from the genus Iluocoetes, that genus had to be redescribed as the description of the genus was based on this taxon rather than the type species. Iluocoetes is now monospecific too. This genus is classified within the subfamily Lycodinae, one of 4 subfamilies in the family Zoarcidae, the eelpouts.

== Etymology ==
Argentinolycus Is a compound of Argentina, the country the only species is endemic to and lykos, which means "wolf", a common element in the names of Southern eelpouts.The specific name means elongated, this species originally being regarded as an elongated form of Iluocoetes fimbriatus.

== Identification ==
Argentinolycus was identified as a separate genus from Iluocoetes by a number of skeletal differences, although there were fewer than 10 known specimens of this taxon.

== Distribution and habitat ==
Argentinolycus is endemic to the coastal waters of southern Argentina from Puerto Madryn south to Tierra del Fuego. this species occurs in the intertidal zone down to depths of 40 m (130 ft).
