= Bellingshausenia =

Scientific classification
- Kingdom: Animalia
- Phylum: Chordata
- Class: Actinopterygii
- Order: Perciformes
- Family: Zoarcidae
- Subfamily: Lycodinae
- Genus: Bellingshausenia; Matallanas, 2009
- Species: B. olasoi

Binomial name
- Bellingshausenia olasoi Matallanas, 2009

Genus of fishes

Bellingshausenia is a monospecific genus of marine ray-finned fish belonging to the family Zoarcidae, the eelpouts. Its only species is Bellingshausenia olasoi which is only known from the Bellingshausen Sea in the Southern Ocean.

== Taxonomy ==
Bellingshausenia was first proposed as a genus in 2009 by the Argentinian zoologist Jesús Matallanas when he described the only species in the genus, Bellingshausenia olasoi. The type locality of this species is the Bellingshausen Sea in the Southern Ocean at 69°49'34"S, 77°49'92"W. This taxon is classified within the subfamily Lycodinae, one of 4 subfamilies in the family Zoarcidae, the eelpouts. The genus name refers to the type locality while the specific name honours Ignacio Olaso of the Spanish Institute of Oceanography, a friend of Matallanas.

== Description ==
Bellingshausenia has a narrow body with an elongated and compressed tail. The head is more, or less, oval in shape and is a little compressed with a rounded snout. The eyes are not round and reach the top of the head. The mouth sits below the snout and the upper jaw extends posteriorly to the centre of the pupil in females and to just beyond the rear edge of the eye in males. It has thin lips, and the lower lip has a posterior lobe. The tube of the nostril nasal tube does not extend to the upper lip. The gill slit extending reached down to the lower edge of the base of the pectoral fin. There is a small hook-shaped lobe on the operculum. There are conical teeth in the jaws, vomer and palatine. The teeth in the premaxilla are arranged in 3 rows at the front, reduced to a single row at the back. The lower jaw has 34 irregular rows to the front and a single row to the rear. In addition, this taxon is characterised by having seven branchiostegal ray and other skeletal features. This species has reached a standard length of 28 cm (11 in). In alcohol the colour of the females is dark brown on the head and body dark brown, darker on the upper sides and the lower part of the head is greyish with a brown-greyish belly; the males are almost a uniform light brown in colour.

== Distribution and habitat ==
Bellingshausenia is a benthopelagic fish that has only been recorded from the Bellingshausen Sea in the Southern Ocean.
