= Exechodontes =

Conservation status
- Least Concern (IUCN 3.1)

Scientific classification
- Kingdom: Animalia
- Phylum: Chordata
- Class: Actinopterygii
- Order: Perciformes
- Family: Zoarcidae
- Subfamily: Lycodinae
- Genus: Exechodontes; DeWitt, 21977
- Species: E. daidaleus

Binomial name
- Exechodontes daidaleus DeWitt, 1977

Genus of fishes

Exechodontes is a monospecific genus of marine ray-finned fish belonging to the family Zoarcidae, the eelpouts. Its only species is Exechodontes daidaleus which is found in the Western Atlantic Ocean.
