= Hadropareia =

Scientific classification
- Kingdom: Animalia
- Phylum: Chordata
- Class: Actinopterygii
- Order: Perciformes
- Family: Zoarcidae
- Subfamily: Gymnelinae
- Genus: Hadropareia; Schmidt, 1904

Type species
- Hadropareia middendorffii Schmidt, 1904

Genus of fishes

Hadropareia is a genus of marine ray-finned fishes belonging to the family Zoarcidae, the eelpouts. The fishes in this genus are found in the northwestern Pacific Ocean.

== Species ==
The following species are classified within the genus Hadropareia:

- Hadropareia middendorffii Schmidt, 1904
- Hadropareia semisquamata Andriashev & Matyushin, 1989
