= Pogonolycus =

Scientific classification
- Kingdom: Animalia
- Phylum: Chordata
- Class: Actinopterygii
- Order: Perciformes
- Family: Zoarcidae
- Subfamily: Lycodinae
- Genus: Pogonolycus; Norman, 1964

Type species
- Pogonolycus elegans Norman, 1937

Synonyms
- Haushia Lloris, 1988

Genus of fishes

Pogonolycus is a small genus of marine ray-finned fishes belonging to the family Zoarcidae, the eelpouts. Its two species are found in the southeast Pacific and southwest Atlantic Oceans.

== Species ==
Oidiphorus contains 2 species:

- Pogonolycus elegans (Norman, 1937)
- Pogonolycus marinae (Lloris, 1988)
