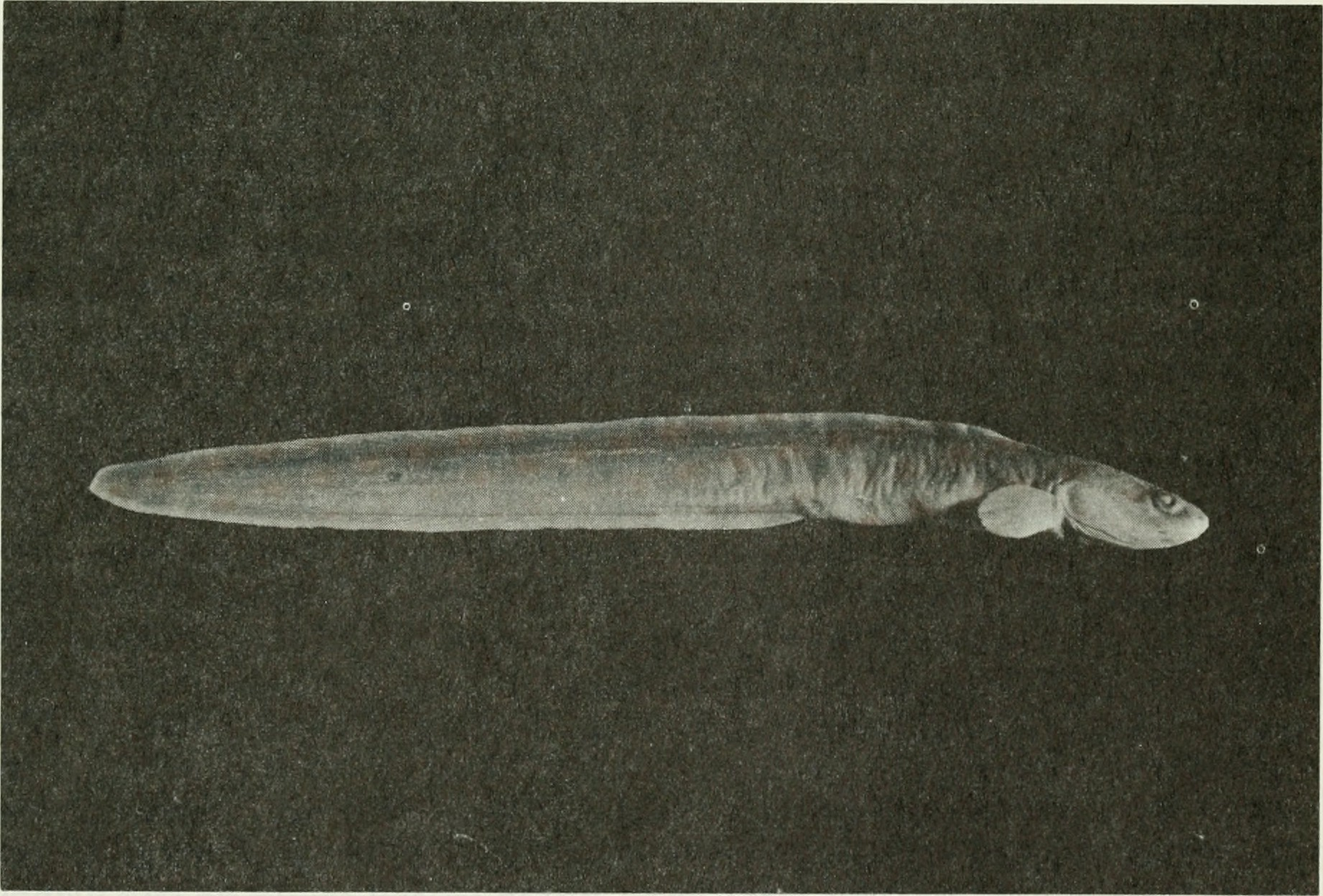

Scientific classification
- Kingdom: Animalia
- Phylum: Chordata
- Class: Actinopterygii
- Order: Perciformes
- Family: Zoarcidae
- Subfamily: Lycodinae
- Genus: Eucryphycus; M. E. Anderson, 1988
- Species: E. californicus

Binomial name
- Eucryphycus californicus (Starks & Mann, 1911)

Synonyms
- Maynea californica Starks & Mann, 1911

= Persimmon eelpout =

Species of fish

The persimmon eelpout (Eucryphycus californicus) is a species of marine ray-finned fish, an eelpout, belonging to the family Zoarcidae. It is the only species in the monospecific genus Eucryphycus. This fish is found in the eastern central Pacific Ocean off California.
