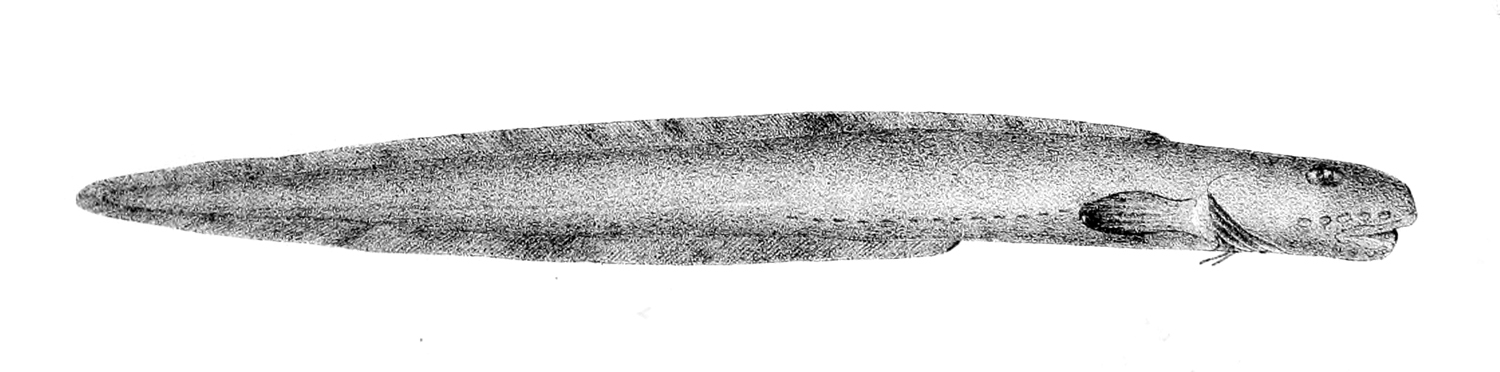
- Ophthalmolycus amberensis

Scientific classification
- Kingdom: Animalia
- Phylum: Chordata
- Class: Actinopterygii
- Order: Perciformes
- Family: Zoarcidae
- Subfamily: Lycodinae
- Genus: Ophthalmolycus; Regan, 1913

Type species
- Lycodes macrops Günther, 1880

Synonyms
- Lacrimolycus Andriashev & Fedorov, 1986

= Ophthalmolycus =

- Ophthalmolycus macrops

Genus of fishes

Ophthalmolycus is a genus of marine ray-finned fishes belonging to the family Zoarcidae, the eelpouts. Its two species are found in the southwestern Atlantic Ocean and the Southern Ocean.

== Species ==
Ophthalmolycus contains the following species:

- Ophthalmolycus amberensis (Tomo, Marschoff & Torno, 1977)
- Ophthalmolycus andersoni Matallanas, 2009
- Ophthalmolycus bothriocephalus (Pappenheim, 1912)
- Ophthalmolycus campbellensis Andriashev & Fedorov, 1986
- Ophthalmolycus chilensis M. E. Anderson, 1992
- Ophthalmolycus conorhynchus (Garman, 1899)
- Ophthalmolycus eastmani Matallanas, 2011
- Ophthalmolycus macrops (Günther, 1880)
- Ophthalmolycus polylepis Matallanas, 2011
