= Aiakas =

Scientific classification
- Kingdom: Animalia
- Phylum: Chordata
- Class: Actinopterygii
- Order: Perciformes
- Family: Zoarcidae
- Subfamily: Lycodinae
- Genus: Aiakas; Gosztonyi, 1977

Type species
- Aiakas kreffti Gosztonyi, 1977

Species
- 2, see text

Genus of fishes

Aiakas is a genus of marine ray-finned fishes belonging to the family Zoarcidae the eelpouts. These fishes are found in the southwestern Atlantic Ocean.

== Taxonomy ==
Aiakes was first proposed as a genus in 1974 by the Argentina-based marine biologist Atila E. Gosztonyi. He named the new monospecific genus when he described its type species, and then only species, was called Aiakas kreffti, which had been collected from a depth of 800 m (2,600 ft) on the continental slope off Golfo San Jorge, Argentina. A second species, A. zinorum, was later described by M. Eric Anderson and Gosztonyi in 1991, also from off southern Argentina. This genus is classified within the subfamily Lycodinae, one of 4 subfamilies in the family Zoarcidae, or the eelpouts.

== Species ==
The following two species are classified within the genus:

- Aiakas kreffti Gosztonyi, 1977
- Aiakas zinorum Anderson & Gosztonyi, 1991

== Etymology ==
Aiakas, the genus name, is derived from the Yamana word aiakasi, which manes "deep-sea fish", an allusion to the type locality. The specific name of the type species, A. kreffti, honours the German ichthyologist Gerhard Krefft, of the Institute für Seefischerei in Hamburg for his assistance in describing that species. The specific name of A. zinorum honours the Soviet ichthyologists of ZIL, an abbreviation for the Zoological Institute of the Academy of Sciences of the Soviet Union, for their studies on the fishes of the Southern Ocean.

== Characteristics ==
Aiakas eelpouts are differentiated from related genera by having the lower lip attached to the mandibular symphysis, the nostril tubes do not overlap the upper lip, and they have teeth on the oral valve, vomer and palatine bone. There are no pelvic fins or papillae on the skin. The flesh is not gelatinous and they have scales. A. kresffti has 18 or 19 fin rays in the pectoral fin, no pore on the intraorbital region and 6 suborbital pores. A. zimorum has 14 or 15 fin rays in the pectoral fin, a pore on the intraorbital region and 5 suborbital pores.

== Distribution and habitat ==
Aiakas eelpouts are bathydemersal fishes of the southwestern Atlantic Ocean living at depths greater than 500 m (1,600 ft).

== Notes ==
- "Aiakas". Integrated Taxonomic Information System.
