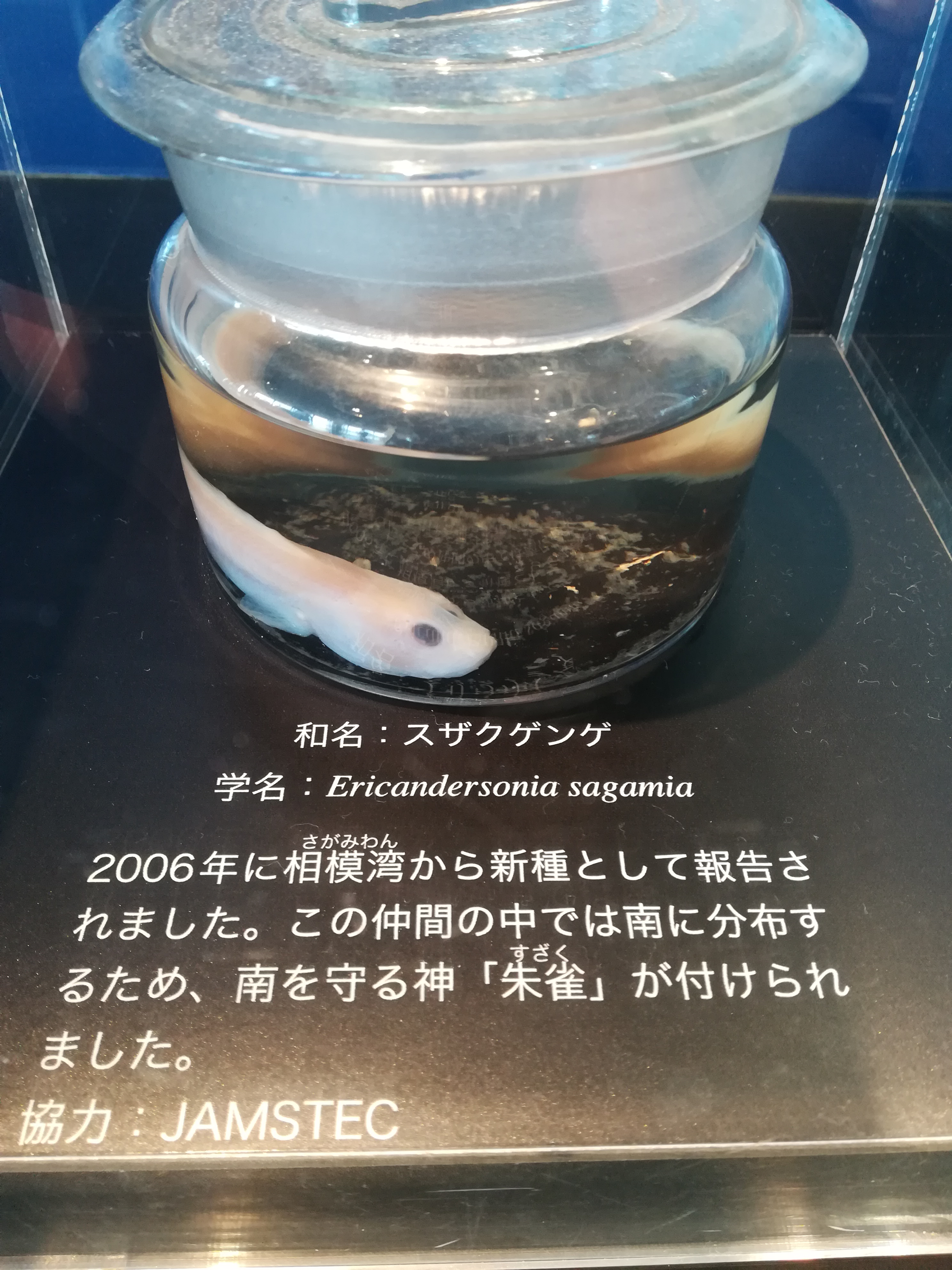
- Specimen in Enoshima Aquarium

Scientific classification
- Kingdom: Animalia
- Phylum: Chordata
- Class: Actinopterygii
- Order: Perciformes
- Family: Zoarcidae
- Subfamily: Gymnelinae
- Genus: Ericandersonia
- Species: E. sagamia

Binomial name
- Ericandersonia sagamia Shinohara & Sakurai, 2006

= Ericandersonia =

Species of fish

Ericandersonia is a monospecific genus belonging to the family Zoarcidae, the eelpouts. The only species is Ericandersonia sagamia, a deepwater fish in the family Zoarcidae. The genus and species were newly described in 2006. It was found in Sagami Bay, Japan, at depths of between 880 and 930 m (2,890 and 3,050 ft). The genus name honours the South African based American ichthyologist M. Eric Anderson in recognition of his eelpout studies.
