= Notolycodes =

Scientific classification
- Kingdom: Animalia
- Phylum: Chordata
- Class: Actinopterygii
- Order: Perciformes
- Family: Zoarcidae
- Subfamily: Lycodinae
- Genus: Notolycodes; Gosztonyi, 1971
- Species: N. schmidti

Binomial name
- Notolycodes schmidti Gosztonyi, 1971

Monospecific genus of marine ray-finned fish

Notolycodes is a monospecific genus of marine ray-finned fish belonging to the family Zoarcidae, the eelpouts. Its only species is Notolycodes schmidti which is found in the southwestern Atlantic Ocean off Brazil and Argentina.
