= Nalbantichthys =

Scientific classification
- Kingdom: Animalia
- Phylum: Chordata
- Class: Actinopterygii
- Order: Perciformes
- Family: Zoarcidae
- Subfamily: Gymnelinae
- Genus: Nalbantichthys; Schultz, 1967
- Species: N. elongatus

Binomial name
- Nalbantichthys elongatus Schultz, 1967

Species of fish

Nalbanichthys is a monospecific genus belonging to the family Zoarcidae, the eelpouts. Its only species is Nalbanichthys elongatus which is found in the southern Bering Sea. The genus name honours the Romanian ichthyologist Theodor Nalbant who sent specimens to Leonard Peter Schultz for him to describe.
