= Looseskin eelpout =

Scientific classification
- Kingdom: Animalia
- Phylum: Chordata
- Class: Actinopterygii
- Order: Perciformes
- Family: Zoarcidae
- Subfamily: Lycodinae
- Genus: Taranetzella; Andriashev, 1952
- Species: T. lyoderma

Binomial name
- Taranetzella lyoderma Andriashev, 1952

Species of fish

The loosekin eelpout (Taranetzella lyoderma) is a species of marine ray-finned fish belonging to the family Zoarcidae, the eelpouts. It is the only species in the monospecific genus Taranetzella. This eelpout is found in the North Pacific Ocean from central Japan north to the southern Bering Sea, and south along the western coast of North America as far as central Baja California in Mexico, it also occurs at Guadalupe Island.
