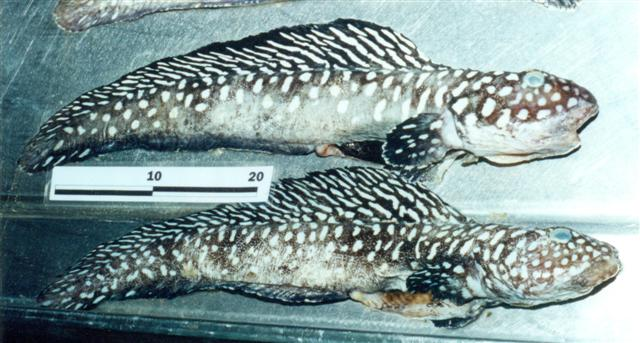

Scientific classification
- Kingdom: Animalia
- Phylum: Chordata
- Class: Actinopterygii
- Division: Teleostei
- Order: Perciformes
- Family: Zoarcidae
- Subfamily: Lycodinae
- Genus: Iluocoetes
- Species: I. fimbriatus

Binomial name
- Iluocoetes fimbriatus Jenyns, 1842

Synonyms
- Lycodes variegatus Günther, 1862; Phucocoetes variegatus f. macropus Smitt, 1898; Caneolepis acropterus Lahille, 1908; Iluocoetes facali Lloris & Rucabado, 1987

= Iluocoetes =

Genus of fishes

Iluocoetes is a monospecific genus of marine ray-finned fish belonging to the family Zoarcidae, the eelpouts. The only species in the genus is Iluocoetes fimbriatus. This species is found off southern South America, off Chile and Argentina, in the southeastern Pacific and southwestern Atlantic Oceans.

== Taxonomy ==
Iluocoetes was first proposed as a monotypic genus in 1842 by the English clergyman and naturalist Leonard Jenyns when he described Iluocoetes fimbriatus with its type locality given as the Chiloé Archipelago in Chile. In 1898 the Danish zoologist Fredrik Adam Smitt described Phucocoetes variegatus in four forms, one of Smitt's forms, elongatus, was subsequently reclassified as Iliocoets elongatus and in 2012 this was reclassified into another monotypic genus Argentinolycus. Iluocoetes is classified within the subfamily Lycodinae, one of 4 subfamilies in the family Zoarcidae, the eelpouts. Some authorities include a second species, Iluocoetes facali, in the genus but others regard this taxon as a junior synonym of I. fimbriatus.

== Etymology ==
Iluocoetes was described from a holotype was collected by Charles Darwin from under stones and weed so Jenyns combined ilyos, meaning "mud" or "ooze", with koitos, which means "a place of rest" or "bed", to form the generic name. The specific name fimbriatus means "fringed" referring to the row of tubercules on each cheek.

== Identification ==
Iluocoetes was identified as a separate genus from Argentinolycus by a number of skeletal differences, although there were fewer than 10 known specimens of Argentinolycus. This species attains a maximum total length of 35.6 cm (14.0 in). The head and body, especially the upper part, are mid brown in colour with many white spots and there is a dark band extending from the lower front edge of the eye to the upper jaw.

== Distribution and habitat ==
Iluocoetes is found off southern South America in the southwestern Atlantic Ocean off Argentina and around the Falkland Islands and in the southeast Pacific Ocean off Chile, including Tierra del Fuego. It can be found in brackish waters and the intertidal zone down to depths of 600 m (2,000 ft).
