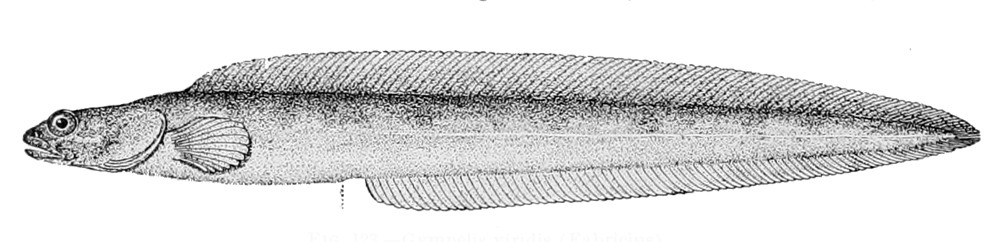
- Gymnelus viridis

Scientific classification
- Kingdom: Animalia
- Phylum: Chordata
- Class: Actinopterygii
- Order: Perciformes
- Family: Zoarcidae
- Subfamily: Gymnelinae; Gill, 1863

Genera
- See text

= Gymnelinae =

Subfamily of fish

Gymnelinae is a subfamily of marine ray-finned fish belonging to the family Zoarcidae, the eelpouts. Most species are found in the North Pacific Ocean but one genus is cosmopolitan, and another is endemic to the Southern Ocean.

== Taxonomy ==
Gymenlinae was first proposed as a taxonomic grouping in 1861 by Theodore Gill. The subfamily is classified within the eelpout family, Zoarcidae part of the suborder Zoarcoidei within the order Scorpaeniformes. The name of the subfamily derives from its type genus, Gymnelus, which means "naked eel" and refers to the scaleless body of its type species Gymnelus viridis.

== Genera ==
Gymnelinae contains the following genera:

- Andriashevia Fedorov & Neelov, 1978
- Barbapellis Iglésias, Dettai & Ozouf-Costaz, 2012
- Bilabria Schmidt, 1936
- Davidijordania Popov, 1931
- Ericandersonia Shinohara & Sakurai, 2006
- Gymnelopsis Soldatov, 1922
- Gymnelus Reinhardt 1834
- Hadropareia Schmidt, 1904
- Krusensterniella Schmidt, 1904
- Magadanichthys Shinohara, Nazarkin & Chereshnev, 2006
- Melanostigma Günther, 1881
- Nalbantichthys Schultz, 1967
- Opaeophacus Bond & Stein, 1984
- Puzanovia Fedorov, 1975
- Seleniolycus Anderson, 1988

== Characteritics ==
Gymnelinae eelpouts have an elongate body and tail. Their branchiostegal membranes have a wide joint with the isthmus, the gill slit typically reaches to around the centre of the base of the pectoral fin, although it may just be a small pore placed high above the pectoral fin. There is normally a pore between the eyes. The caudal fin has between 5 and 12 rays. There are between 4 and 8 suborbital bones which form a semicircular ridge around the eye. there are usually no spines in the fins. Most of the species are between 10 and 20 cm (3.9 and 7.9 in) in length but the largest is Gymnelus viridis which has a maximum published total length of 56 cm (22 in).

== Distribution ==
Gymnelinae eelpouts are mostly found in the North Pacific with one genus, Melanostigma being found around the world, and another, Seleniolycus, being restricted to the Southern Ocean.
