= Magadania (plant) =

Scientific classification
- Kingdom: Plantae
- Clade: Tracheophytes
- Clade: Angiosperms
- Clade: Eudicots
- Clade: Asterids
- Order: Apiales
- Family: Apiaceae
- Subfamily: Apioideae
- Tribe: Selineae
- Genus: Magadania; Pimenov & Lavrova

Genus of plants

Magadania is a genus of flowering plants belonging to the family Apiaceae.

Its native range is the Russian Far East.

== Species ==
Species:

- Magadania olaensis (Gorovoj & N.S.Pavlova) Pimenov & Lavrova
- Magadania victoris (Schischk.) Pimenov & Lavrova
