= Letholycus =

Scientific classification
- Kingdom: Animalia
- Phylum: Chordata
- Class: Actinopterygii
- Order: Perciformes
- Suborder: Zoarcoidei
- Family: Zoarcidae
- Subfamily: Lycodinae
- Genus: Letholycus; M. E. Anderson, 1988

Type species
- Melanostigma microphthalmus Norman, 1937

Genus of ray-finned fishes

Letholycus is a genus of marine ray-finned fishes belonging to the family Zoarcidae, the eelpouts. This is a small genus with only two species found in the southwestern Atlantic Ocean.

== Species ==
Letholycus contains the following two species:

- Letholycus magellanicus M. E. Anderson, 1988
- Letholycus microphthalmus (Norman, 1937)
