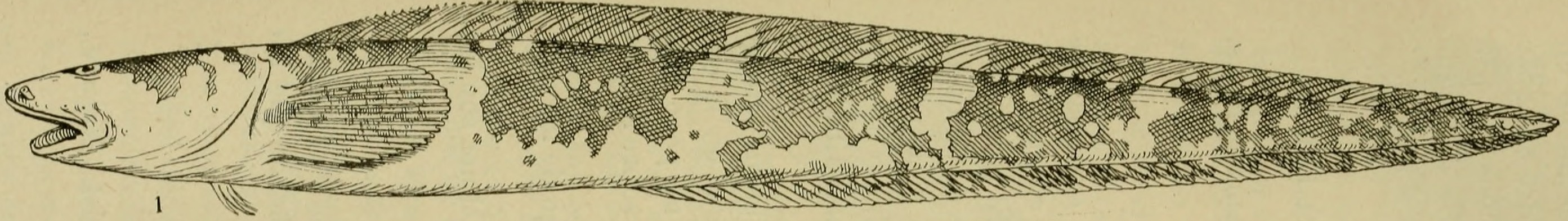

Conservation status
- Least Concern (IUCN 3.1)

Scientific classification
- Kingdom: Animalia
- Phylum: Chordata
- Class: Actinopterygii
- Order: Perciformes
- Family: Zoarcidae
- Subfamily: Lycodinae
- Genus: Phucocoetes; Jenyns, 1871
- Species: P. latitans

Binomial name
- Phucocoetes latitans Jenyns, 1842

= Phucocoetes =

Monospecific genus of marine ray-finned fish

Phucocoetes is a monospecific genus of marine ray-finned fish belonging to the family Zoarcidae, the eelpouts. Its only species is Phucocoetes latitans which is found in the southwestern Atlantic Ocean off Argentina and the Falkland Islands.
