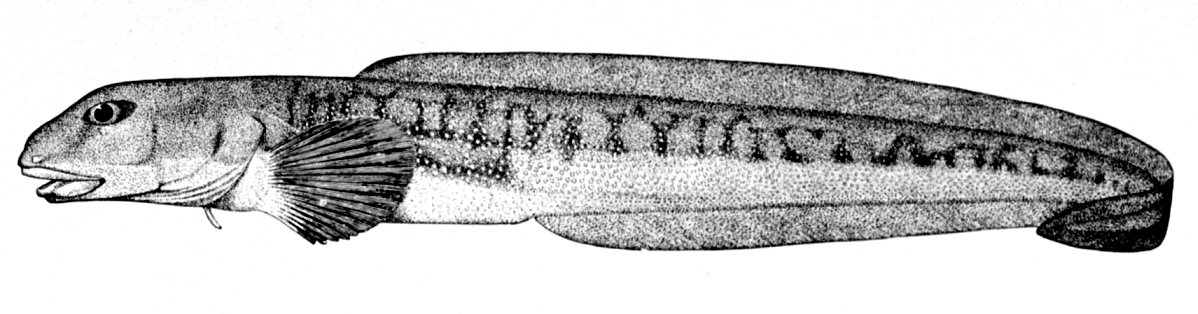
- Lycodes vahlii

Scientific classification
- Kingdom: Animalia
- Phylum: Chordata
- Class: Actinopterygii
- Order: Perciformes
- Suborder: Zoarcoidei
- Family: Zoarcidae
- Subfamily: Lycodinae; Gill, 1861

Genera
- See text

= Lycodinae =

Subfamily of fishes

Lycodinae is a subfamily of marine ray-finned fish belonging to the family Zoarcidae, the eelpouts. These eelpouts are found are in all the world's oceans, with a number of species being found off southern South America.

== Taxonomy ==
Lycodinae was first proposed as a taxonomic grouping in 1861 by the American zoologist Theodore Gill. The subfamily is classified within the eelpout family, Zoarcidae part of the suborder Zoarcoidei within the order Scorpaeniformes. The name of the subfamily derives from its type genus, Lycodes, which means "wolf-like" and refers to the then presumed close relationship of that taxon to the wolffish.

== Genera ==
Lycodinae contains the following genera:

- Aiakas Gosztonyi, 1977
- Argentinolycus Matallanas & Corbella, 2012
- Austrolycus Regan, 1913
- Bellingshausenia Matallanas, 2009
- Bentartia Matallanas, 2010
- Bothrocara Bean, 1890
- Bothrocarina Suvorov, 1935
- Crossostomus Lahille, 1908
- Dadyanos Whitley, 1951
- Derepodichthys Gilbert, 1896
- Dieidolycus Anderson, 1988
- Eucryphycus Anderson, 1988
- Exechodontes DeWitt, 1977
- Gosztonyia Matallanas, 2009
- Hadropogonichthys Fedorov, 1982
- Iluocoetes Jenyns, 1842
- Japonolycodes Shinohara, Sakurai & Machida, 2002
- Letholycus Anderson, 1988
- Leucogrammolycus Mincarone & Anderson, 2008
- Lycenchelys Gill, 1884
- Lycodapus Gilbert, 1890
- Lycodes Reinhardt, 1831
- Lycodichthys Pappenheim, 1911
- Lycodonus Goode & Bean, 1883
- Lycogrammoides Soldatov & Lindberg, 1928
- Lyconema Gilbert, 1896
- Maynea Cunningham, 1871
- Notolycodes Gosztonyi, 1977
- Oidiphorus McAllister & Rees, 1964
- Ophthalmolycus Regan, 1913
- Pachycara Zugmayer, 1911
- Patagolycus Matallanas & Corbella, 2012
- Phucocoetes Jenyns, 1842
- Piedrabuenia Gosztonyi, 1977
- Plesienchelys Anderson, 1988
- Pogonolycus Norman, 1937
- Pyrolycus Machida & Hashimoto, 2002
- Santelmoa Matallanas, 2010
- Taranetzella Andriashev, 1952
- Thermarces Rosenblatt & Cohen, 1986

== Characteristics ==
Lycodinae eelpouts have elongate heads and bodies, they have between 58 and 144 vertebrae. The branchiostegal membranes are typically attached to the isthmus, although not in Lycodapus. Most have a wide bill slit but in some species it is more restricted. They do not usually possess a pore between the eyes. There are between 4 and 9 suborbital bones, typically, from 6 to 8, and these create an L-shaped pattern around the eyes. There are between 6 and 12 fin rays in the caudal fin. They have no spines in their fins, although in a few species there are pelvic fin rays which are fused into a pelvic splint. The largest species is Lycodes soldatovi which has a maximum published fork length of 91 cm (36 in).

== Distribution ==
Lycodinae eelpouts are found throughout the world with a notable radiation in the littoral to upper continental slope off southern South America.
