= Robert Collett =

Norwegian zoologist (1842–1913)

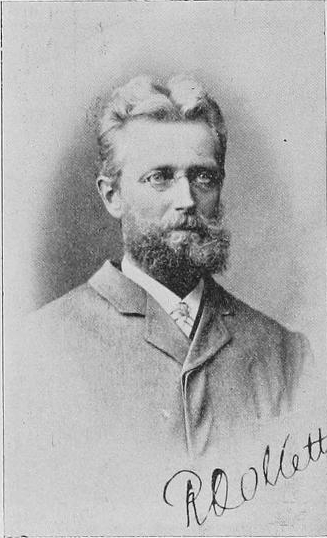
Photo circa 1896

Robert Collett (2 December 1842 – 27 January 1913) was a Norwegian zoologist. Collett was director and curator of the Zoological Museum at University of Oslo.

Robert Collett was born at Christiania (now Oslo), Norway. He was the eldest child of Professor Peter Jonas Collett and Camilla Collett. His maternal uncles included Oscar and Henrik Wergeland, and his paternal uncles included Peter Severin Steenstrup. He had three younger brothers, including the writer and historian, Alf Collett. He never married.

He attended the Latin School in Lillehammer and was a fellow in zoology at the University of Oslo. From 1864 he was curator at the Zoological Museum in Oslo. In 1882 he became its director and was appointed professor in 1885. He worked with vertebrates, primarily fishes. He described many new species of fish, spiders and other organisms.

A popular book Norges pattedyr written by him was on the mammals of Norway. This book was to influence Charles Elton to study the periodic fluctuations in animal populations. The work by Elton on animal fluctuations, particularly those of lemmings challenged the idea that there was a balance in nature.

Collett is commemorated in the scientific names of two species of reptiles: Ctenotus colletti and Pseudechis colletti.

== See also ==
- Category:Taxa named by Robert Collett
