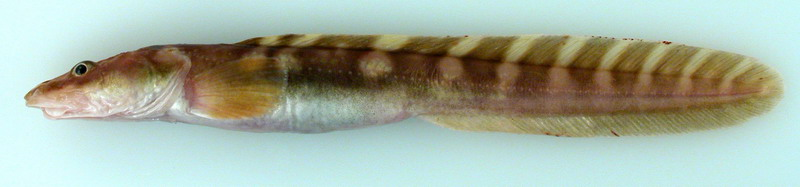
- Lycodes turneri
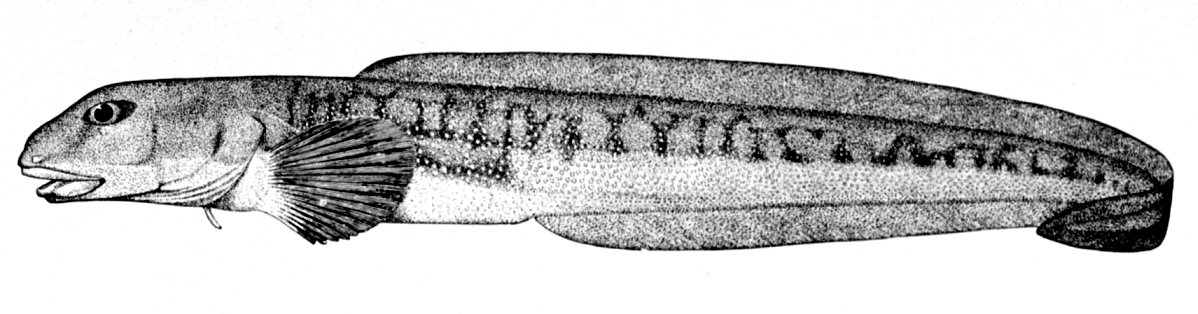
- Lycodes vahlii

Scientific classification
- Kingdom: Animalia
- Phylum: Chordata
- Class: Actinopterygii
- Order: Perciformes
- Family: Zoarcidae
- Subfamily: Lycodinae
- Genus: Lycodes; J. C. H. Reinhardt, 1831

Type species
- Lycodes vahlii Reinhardtm, 1831

Synonyms
- Aprodon Gilbert, 1890; Furcella Jordan & Evermann, 1896; Furcimanus Jordan & Evermann, 1898; Leurynnis Lockington, 1879; Lycias Jordan & Evermann, 1898; Lycodalepis Bleeker, 1874; Lycodopsis Collett, 1879; Petroschmidtia Taranetz & Andriashev, 1934

= Lycodes =

Genus of fishes

Lycodes is a genus of zoarcid fish in the subfamily Lycodinae. It is the most species-rich genus in its taxonomic family as well as in the Arctic Ocean and adjacent waters. They occupy both shallow waters and deeper waters down to 3000 meters. A few species can occur in brackish waters.

== Taxonomy ==
Lycodes was first proposed as a monospecific genus in 1831 by the Danish zoologist Johan Reinhard when he described Lycodes vahlii, which he described from off Greenland. The genus is classified in the subfamily Lycodinae, one of four subfamilies in the family Zoarcidae, the eelpouts. Four species, L. albonotata, L. teraoi, L. toyamensis and L. toyamesnsis are classified within the genus Petroschmidtia by some authorities.

== Etymology ==
Lycodes means "having the form of a wolf", being a combination of lykos meaning "wolf" and oides meaning "similar to". Reinhardt though the teeth were similar to those of Anarhichas lupus and thought that the two taxa were closely related.

== Species ==
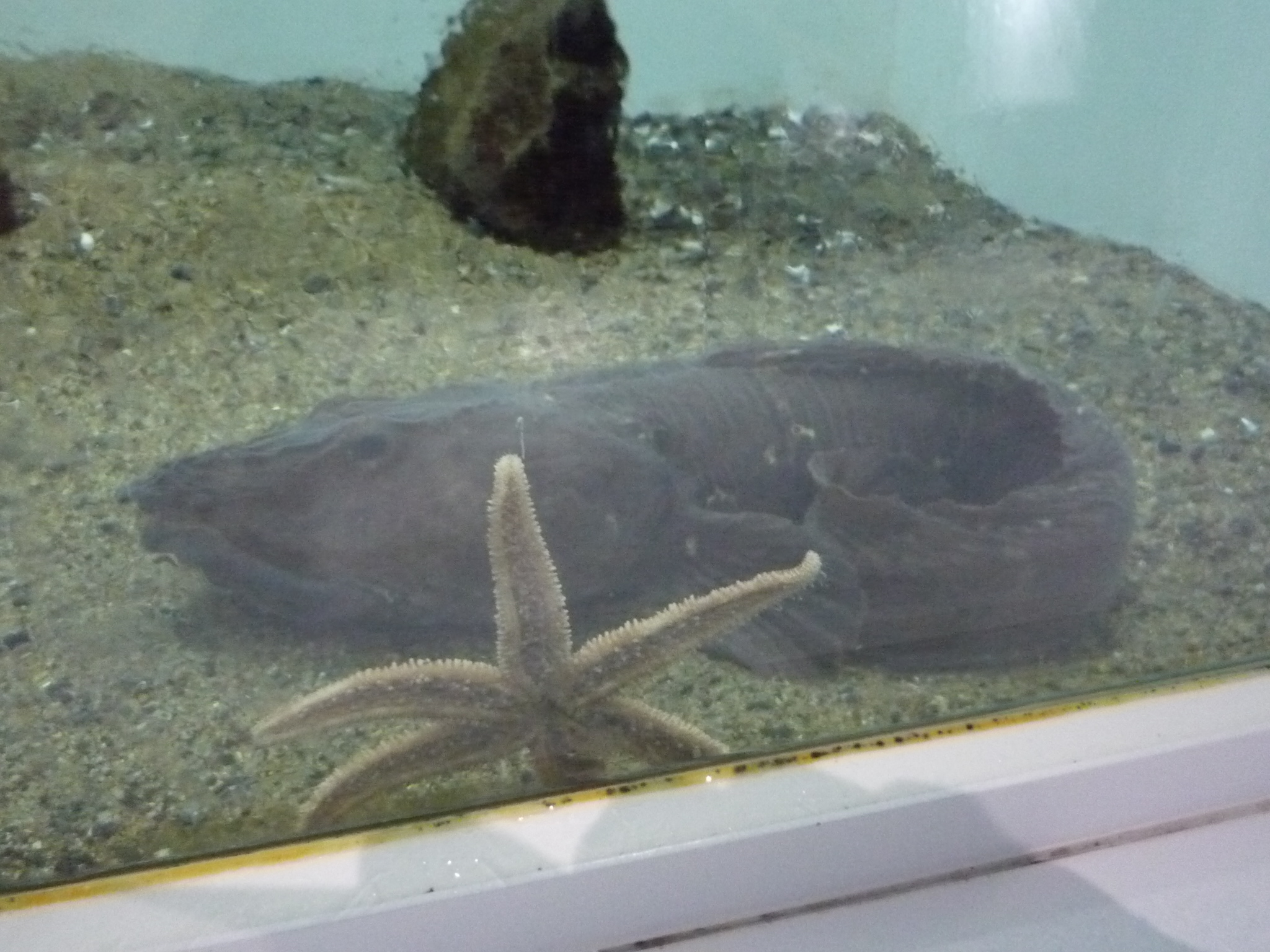
Saddled eelpout

Currently, 64 species are placed in this genus, divided into two subgenera:

- Subgenus Lycodes J. C. H. Reinhardt, 1831
  - Lycodes adolfi J. G. Nielsen & Fosså, 1993 (Adolf's eelpout)
  - Lycodes akuugun D. E. Stevenson & J. W. Orr, 2006
  - Lycodes albolineatus Andriashev, 1955 (whitebar eelpout)
  - Lycodes albonotatus (Taranetz & Andriashev, 1934)
  - Lycodes bathybius P. Y. Schmidt, 1950
  - Lycodes brevipes T. H. Bean, 1890 (shortfin eelpout)
  - Lycodes brunneofasciatus Suvorov, 1935 (tawnystripe eelpout)
  - Lycodes caudimaculatus Matsubara, 1936
  - Lycodes concolor T. N. Gill & Townsend, 1897 (ebony eelpout)
  - Lycodes cortezianus (C. H. Gilbert, 1890) (bigfin eelpout)
  - Lycodes esmarkii Collett, 1875 (greater eelpout)
  - Lycodes eudipleurostictus A. S. Jensen, 1902 (doubleline eelpout)
  - Lycodes fasciatus (P. Y. Schmidt, 1904) (banded eelpout)
  - Lycodes frigidus Collett, 1879 (glacial eelpout)
  - Lycodes fulvus Toyoshima, 1985
  - Lycodes gracilis M. Sars, 1867
  - Lycodes heinemanni Soldatov, 1916
  - Lycodes japonicus Matsubara & Iwai, 1951
  - Lycodes jenseni Taranetz & Andriashev, 1935
  - Lycodes jugoricus Knipowitsch, 1906 (Shulupaoluk)
  - Lycodes lavalaei Vladykov & Tremblay, 1936 (Newfoundland eelpout)
  - Lycodes luetkenii Collett, 1880 (Lütken's eelpout)
  - Lycodes macrochir P. Y. Schmidt, 1937
  - Lycodes macrolepis Taranetz & Andriashev, 1935
  - Lycodes marisalbi Knipowitsch, 1906 (white sea eelpout)
  - Lycodes matsubarai Toyoshima, 1985
  - Lycodes mcallisteri Peter Rask Møller, 2001 (McAllister's eelpout)
  - Lycodes microlepidotus P. Y. Schmidt, 1950
  - Lycodes microporus Toyoshima, 1983
  - Lycodes mucosus J. Richardson, 1855 (saddled eelpout)
  - Lycodes obscurus Toyoshima, 1985
  - Lycodes ocellatus Toyoshima, 1985
  - Lycodes paamiuti Møller, 2001 (Paamiut eelpout)
  - Lycodes pacificus Collett, 1879 (blackbelly eelpout)
  - Lycodes palearis C. H. Gilbert, 1896 (wattled eelpout)
  - Lycodes pallidus Collett, 1879 (pale eelpout)
  - Lycodes paucilepidotus Toyoshima, 1985
  - Lycodes polaris (E. Sabine, 1824) (Canadian eelpout)
  - Lycodes raridens Taranetz & Andriashev, 1937 (marbled eelpout)
  - Lycodes reticulatus J. C. H. Reinhardt, 1835 (Arctic eelpout)
  - Lycodes rossi Malmgren, 1865 (threespot eelpout)
  - Lycodes sadoensis Toyoshima & Honma, 1980
  - Lycodes sagittarius D. E. McAllister, 1976 (archer eelpout)
  - Lycodes schmidti Gratzianov, 1907
  - Lycodes semenovi (Popov, 1931)
  - Lycodes seminudus J. C. H. Reinhardt, 1837 (longear eelpout)
  - Lycodes sigmatoides Lindberg & Krasyukova, 1975
  - Lycodes soldatovi Taranetz & Andriashev, 1935
  - Lycodes squamiventer A. S. Jensen, 1904 (scalebelly eelpout)
  - Lycodes tanakae D. S. Jordan & W. F. Thompson, 1914
  - Lycodes teraoi Katayama, 1943
  - Lycodes terraenovae Collett, 1896 (Newfoundland eelpout, Atlantic eelpout)
  - Lycodes toyamensis (Katayama, 1941)
  - Lycodes turneri T. H. Bean, 1879 (polar eelpout)
  - Lycodes uschakovi Popov, 1931
  - Lycodes vahlii J. C. H. Reinhardt, 1831 (Vahl's eelpout)
  - Lycodes yamatoi Toyoshima, 1985
  - Lycodes ygreknotatus P. Y. Schmidt, 1950
- Subgenus Furcimanus Jordan & Evermann, 1898
  - Lycodes beringi Andriashev 1935
  - Lycodes diapterus Gilbert, 1892
  - Lycodes hubbsi Matsubara, 1955
  - Lycodes nakamurae (Tanaka, 1914)
  - Lycodes nishimurai Shinohara & Shirai, 2005
  - Lycodes pectoralis Toyoshima, 1985

== Description ==
The genus is characterized by one autapomorphy: submental crests, the more or less pronounced cartilage extensions on the lower jaws. Within the genus, one clade has been identified, the "short-tailed" Lycodes that are associated with shallower depths (0–1200 m) than the long-tailed species (3–3000 m). Short tail might represent an adaptation to shallow, Arctic waters; the clade includes many Arctic endemics. In contrast, the long-tailed species do not form a monophyletic group. Coloration of all short-tailed Lycodes includes some sorts of stripes, marks, or reticulations, while the long-tailed species are uniformly brownish, striped, or spotted.

== Ecology ==
Lycodes are bottom-dwelling fish with a relatively stationary life style. The eggs are benthic, few in number (<2000) and large in size (as large as 10 mm (0.4 in)).
