= Peter Schmidt (zoologist) =

Russian and Soviet zoologist (1872–1949)

Peter Yulievich Schmidt (Russian: Пётр Юльевич Шмидт, romanized: Pyotr Yulyevich Shmidt; 23 December 1872, St. Petersburg – 25 November 1949, Leningrad) was a Russian and Soviet zoologist, ichthyologist, and museum curator.

== Career ==
Peter Yulievich Schmidt attended the gymnasium of KI May before studying at the Physics and Mathematics Faculty of St. Petersburg University, from where he graduated in 1895. He was engaged in the laboratory of Professor V.M. Shimkevich and V.T. Shevyakov. He travelled through Semirechiy from 1899 to 1902. From 1908 to 1910, he participated in the Kamchatka expedition of F. P. Ryabushinsky, where he headed the zoological department. In 1906, he was awarded with a gold medal named after Petr Petrovich Semyonov by the Imperial Russian Geographical Society.

From 1906 to 1930, he held the position of a professor at the Agricultural Institute in Leningrad, and from 1914 to 1931, he worked at the Zoological Museum of the Soviet Academy of Sciences. From 1930 to 1949, Schmidt was a scientific secretary to the Pacific Committee of the Soviet Academy of Sciences.

In 1938, he was arrested, along with a group of other employees of the Zoological Institute of the Soviet Academy of Sciences, by the NKVD because they had non-Russian surnames. Schmidt was suspected of espionage for Germany and Japan on the grounds that he had been on scientific missions in Berlin and Tokyo. After interrogation, during which the 66-year-old professor was knocked out, he signed the protocol as required by the NKVD investigators and also confessed to being an Italian spy, as his daughter lived in Italy. Eventually, he was released and was able to continue his scientific activity.

Until 1900, the main scientific interests of Schmidt were in arachnology, the morphology of the inferior millipedes and the invertebrate fauna of Semirechiye. Even while he was at university, he received a gold medal for a study of millipedes a gold medal. His best known work came after 1900 when he began to study the fish fauna of the Pacific and Ichthyology in its broader sense. Schmidt was the first zoologist to observe the anabiosis in desiccated earthworms. He translated scientific literature from German into Russian and was the editor of the Russian-language Small Biological Encyclopedia.

The colubrid snake Dolichophis schmidti, the salmonid Salvelinus schmidti, the cod species Lepidion schmidti, the Northern smoothtongue Leuroglossus schmidti, the eelpout Lycogrammoides schmidti, the lumpfish Eumicrotremus schmidti, the amphipod Anisogammarus schmidti, and a range of mountains on the island of Urup in the Kurile Islands are all named in honour of Schmidt.

== Publications ==
- Schmidt P. Ueber das Leuchten der Zuckmücken Zool. Jahr., vol. VIII, 1892
- Schmidt P. Beiträge zur Kenntn. der niederen Myriapoden Zeit. wis. Zool., LIX, 1895
- Schmidt P. Beitrag zur Kenntnis Laufspinnen (Araneae, Citigradae Thor.) Russlands // Zool. Jahrb. Abt. Syst. 1895. Bd. 8. H. 4. S. 439 484.
- Materials for the knowledge of the Semirechye region fauna Notes of the West Siberian Branch of the Imperial Russian Geographical Society, 1896 (in Russian)
- Pisces of the eastern seas of the Russian Empire, St. Petersburg, 1904 (in Russian)
- Marine crafts of Sakhalin Island, St. Petersburg, 1905 (in Russian)
- The work of the Zoological Department in Kamchatka in 1908 - 1909. // Kamchatka expedition of Fedor Pavlovich Ryabushinsky ... Russian Geographical. society. Zoological. department, at. 1 M., Printing house of Ryabushinskikh T., 1916 (in Russian)
- Anabiosis 1923 (in Russian)
- Soulful life of animals and its study. 1929 (in Russian)
- The organism among organisms Moscow - Leningrad, Publishing House of the Academy of Sciences of the USSR, 166, [2] c. : ill. 1941 (in Russian)
- Pisces of the Pacific Ocean. An outline of modern theories and views on the distribution and development of the fauna of the Pacific fish, Moscow, 1948 (in Russian)
- Fish of the Sea of Okhotsk, Moscow, 1950 (in Russian)

== Taxon described by him ==
- See Category:Taxa named by Peter Schmidt (zoologist)
