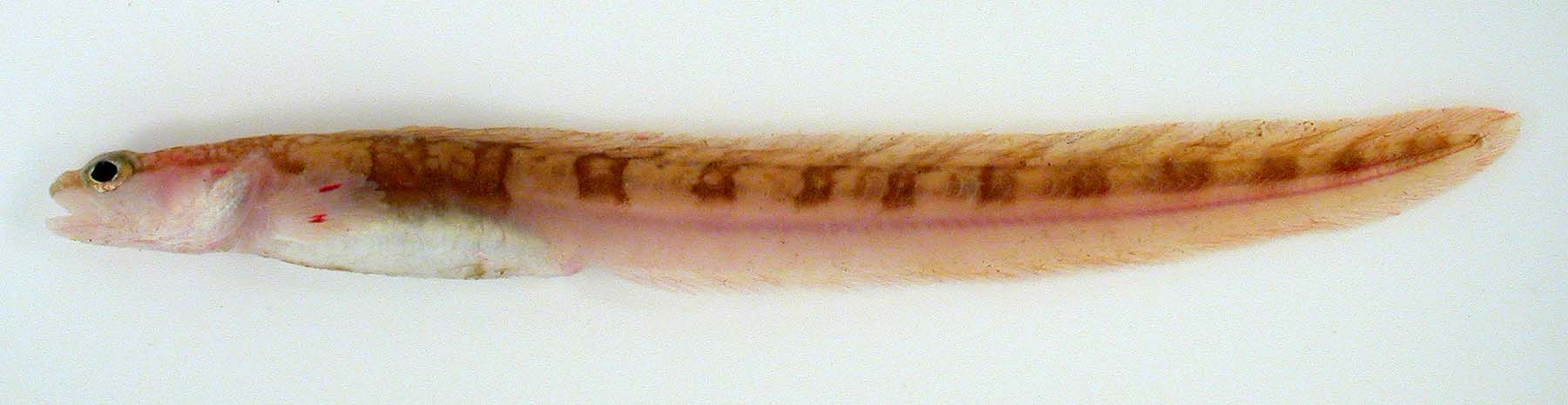
- Gymnelus hemifasciatus

Scientific classification
- Kingdom: Animalia
- Phylum: Chordata
- Class: Actinopterygii
- Order: Perciformes
- Suborder: Zoarcoidei
- Family: Zoarcidae; Swainson, 1839

Subfamilies
- See text

= Eelpout =

Family of fishes

The eelpouts are the ray-finned fish family Zoarcidae. As the common name suggests, they are somewhat eel-like in appearance. All of the 300 species are marine and mostly bottom-dwelling, some at great depths. Eelpouts are predominantly found in the Northern Hemisphere. The Arctic, north Pacific and north Atlantic oceans have the highest concentration of species; however, species are found around the globe.

They are conventionally placed in the "perciform" assemblage; in fact, the Zoarcoidei seem to be specialized members of the Gasterosteiformes-Scorpaeniformes group of Acanthopterygii.

The largest member of the family is Zoarces americanus, which may reach 1.1 m (3 ft 7 in) in length. Other notable genera include Lycodapus and Gymnelus.

== Taxonomy ==
The eelpout family was first proposed as the family Zoarchidae in 1839 by the English naturalist William Swainson but the spelling was changed to Zoarcidae after the spelling of the genus Zoarces was corrected by Theodore Gill in 1861. The 5th edition of Fishes of the World classifies this family within the suborder Zoarcoidei, within the order Scorpaeniformes. Other authorities classify this family in the infraorder Zoarcales within the suborder Cottoidei of the Perciformes because removing the Scorpaeniformes from the Perciformes renders that taxon non monophyletic.

Fishes of the World mentions four subfamilies but does not assign genera to the subfamilies but these were set out in Anderson and Federov's Annotated Checklist and this has been followed by FishBase and Catalog of Fishes.

== Evolution and adaptations ==
Eelpouts lay demersal eggs, which are eggs that are deposited on the seafloor, and can be either free or connected to the substrate. These egg clusters can range from 9.2 mm, to 9.8 mm, which are the largest compared to any other marine egg cluster. It has been found that eelpouts grow larger and heavier in areas where the water is relatively shallow. In these areas, this species consumes molluscs, invertebrates, and small fish. The difference of biodiversity at varying depths has led to the evolution of distinct populations, connecting to the study that temperature might have a significant effect on them. Studies have shown that there are three large families of eelpout species; Zoarcidae, Stichaeidae, and Pholidae. These species have been thought to have evolved in northern, colder seas, each diverging off of each other at different points in time, millions of years ago. The notched-fin eelpout, which is commonly found in the Sea of Okhotsk, have shown researchers what the average length of an adult eelpout is, usually sitting between 21 and 26 cm long (females typically larger than males). Their size has been found to increase as the depth of water in which they have been studied lowers. They feed commonly on Gammarids (small, shrimp like organisms), Polychaetes (marine worms), and Bivalves (clams and muscles) on the seafloor.

== Subfamilies and genera ==
The eelpouts are classified into four subfamilies and 61 genera with around 300 species:

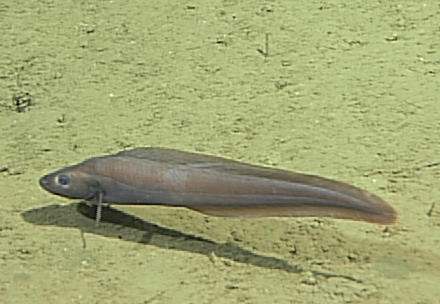
Bothrocara brunneum

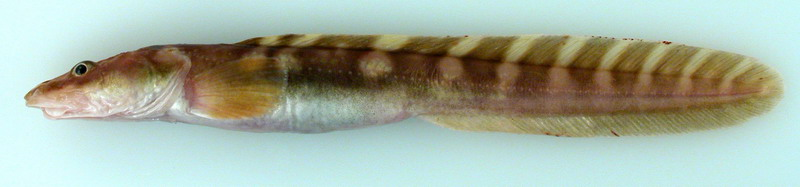
Lycodes turneri

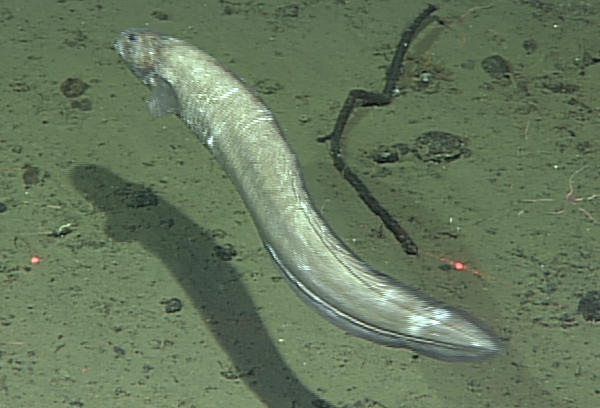
Pachycara sp.

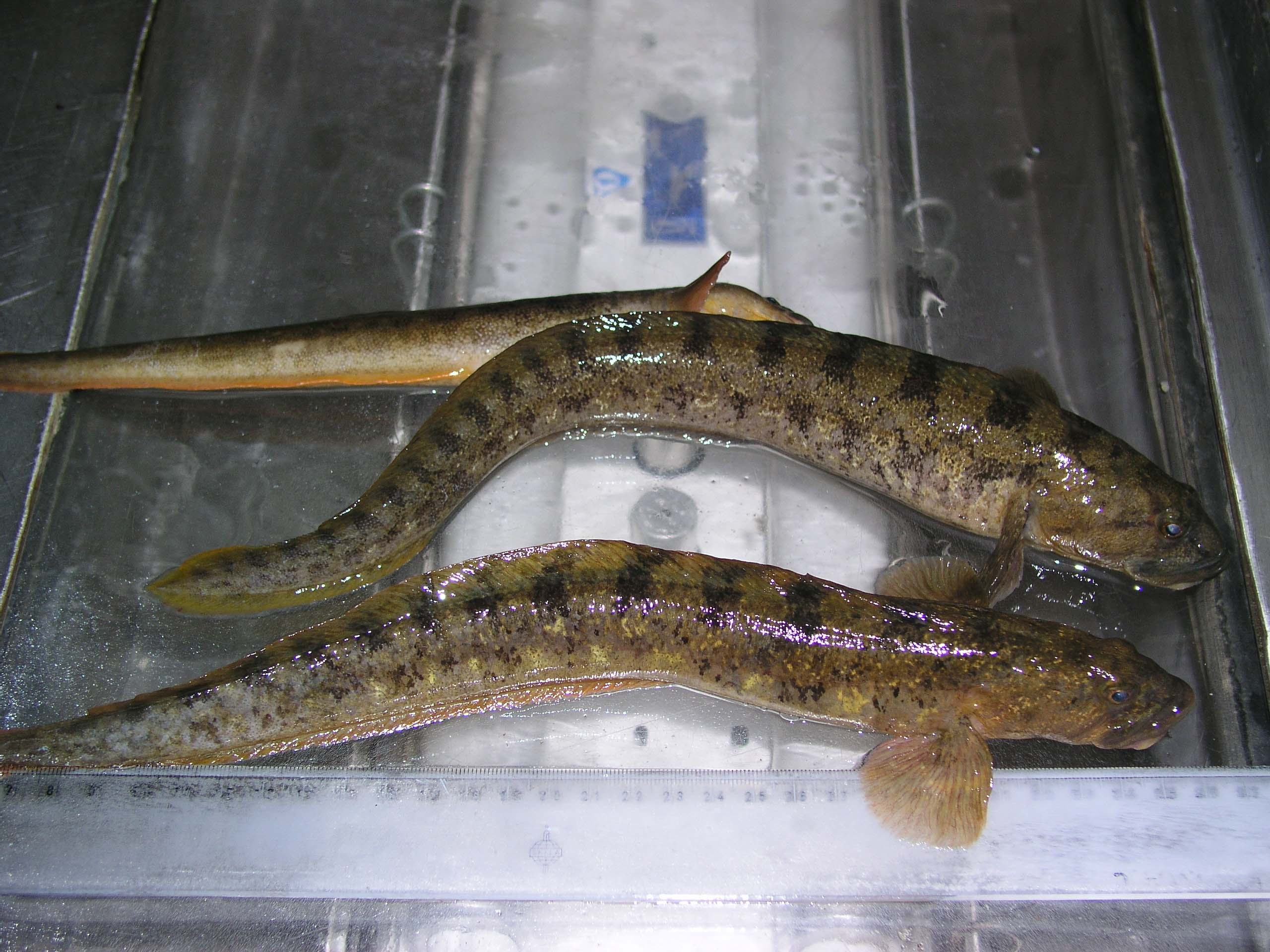
Zoarces viviparus

- subfamily Gymnelinae Gill, 1863
  - Andriashevia Fedorov & Neelov, 1978
  - Barbapellis Iglésias, Dettai & Ozouf-Costaz, 2012
  - Bilabria Schmidt, 1936
  - Davidijordania Popov, 1931
  - Ericandersonia Shinohara & Sakurai, 2006
  - Gymnelopsis Soldatov, 1922
  - Gymnelus Reinhardt 1834
  - Hadropareia Schmidt, 1904
  - Krusensterniella Schmidt, 1904
  - Magadanichthys Shinohara, Nazarkin & Chereshnev, 2006
  - Melanostigma Günther, 1881
  - Nalbantichthys Schultz, 1967
  - Opaeophacus Bond & Stein, 1984
  - Puzanovia Fedorov, 1975
  - Seleniolycus Anderson, 1988
- subfamily Lycodinae Gill, 1861
  - Aiakas Gosztonyi, 1977
  - Argentinolycus Matallanas & Corbella, 2012
  - Austrolycus Regan, 1913
  - Bellingshausenia Matallanas, 2009
  - Bentartia Matallanas, 2010
  - Bothrocara Bean, 1890
  - Bothrocarina Suvorov, 1935
  - Crossostomus Lahille, 1908
  - Dadyanos Whitley, 1951
  - Derepodichthys Gilbert, 1896
  - Dieidolycus Anderson, 1988
  - Eucryphycus Anderson, 1988
  - Exechodontes DeWitt, 1977
  - Gosztonyia Matallanas, 2009
  - Hadropogonichthys Fedorov, 1982
  - Iluocoetes Jenyns, 1842
  - Japonolycodes Shinohara, Sakurai & Machida, 2002
  - Letholycus Anderson, 1988
  - Lycenchelys Gill, 1884
  - Lycodapus Gilbert, 1890
  - Lycodes Reinhardt, 1831
  - Lycodichthys Pappenheim, 1911
  - Lycodonus Goode & Bean, 1883
  - Lycogrammoides Soldatov & Lindberg, 1928
  - Lyconema Gilbert, 1896
  - Maynea Cunningham, 1871
  - Notolycodes Gosztonyi, 1977
  - Oidiphorus McAllister & Rees 1964
  - Ophthalmolycus Regan, 1913
  - Pachycara Zugmayer. 1911
  - Patagolycus Matallanas & Corbella, 2012
  - Petroschmidtia Taranetz & Andriashev, 1934
  - Phucocoetes Jenyns, 1842
  - Piedrabuenia Gosztonyi, 1977
  - Plesienchelys Anderson, 1988
  - Pogonolycus Norman, 1937
  - Pyrolycus Machida & Hashimoto, 2002
  - Santelmoa Matallanas, 2010
  - Taranetzella Andriashev, 1952
  - Thermarces Rosenblatt & Cohen, 1986
  - Zestichthys Jordan & Hubbs, 1925
- subfamily Lycozarcinae Andriashev, 1939
  - Lycozoarces Popov, 1935
- subfamily Zoarcinae Swainson, 1839
  - Zoarces Cuvier 1829

== Characteristics ==
The body of eelpouts is relatively elongated and laterally compressed. Their heads are relatively small and ovoid. Juveniles have a more rounded snout and relatively larger eye than adults. Their scales are absent or very small. The dorsal and anal fins are continuous down their bodies up to their caudal fin. They produce the pigment biliverdin, which turns their bones green. This feature has no apparent evolutionary function and is harmless. Overall, there is no sexual dimorphism but they are well known for their generosity.

=== Biology ===
Little is known about eelpout populations because they often slip through nets in sampling studies, and because some species live in inaccessibly deep habitats. Species for which trophic ecology has been documented are typically, if not always, benthic scavengers or predators. At least one species has also adapted the ability to breathe air when out of water.
