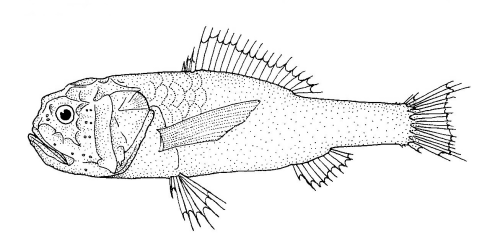
- Drawing by Dr Tony Ayling

Conservation status
- Least Concern (IUCN 3.1)

Scientific classification
- Kingdom: Animalia
- Phylum: Chordata
- Class: Actinopterygii
- Order: Beryciformes
- Family: Melamphaidae
- Genus: Melamphaes
- Species: M. microps

Binomial name
- Melamphaes microps (Günther, 1878)

= Melamphaes microps =

Species of fish

Melamphaes microps, the smalleye bigscale or smalleye ridgehead is a fish of the genus Melamphaes, found in the North Atlantic, South Atlantic, southern Indian Ocean, and the south west Pacific including New Zealand, at depths of from 1,000 to 3,000 m. Their length is up to 10 cm.
