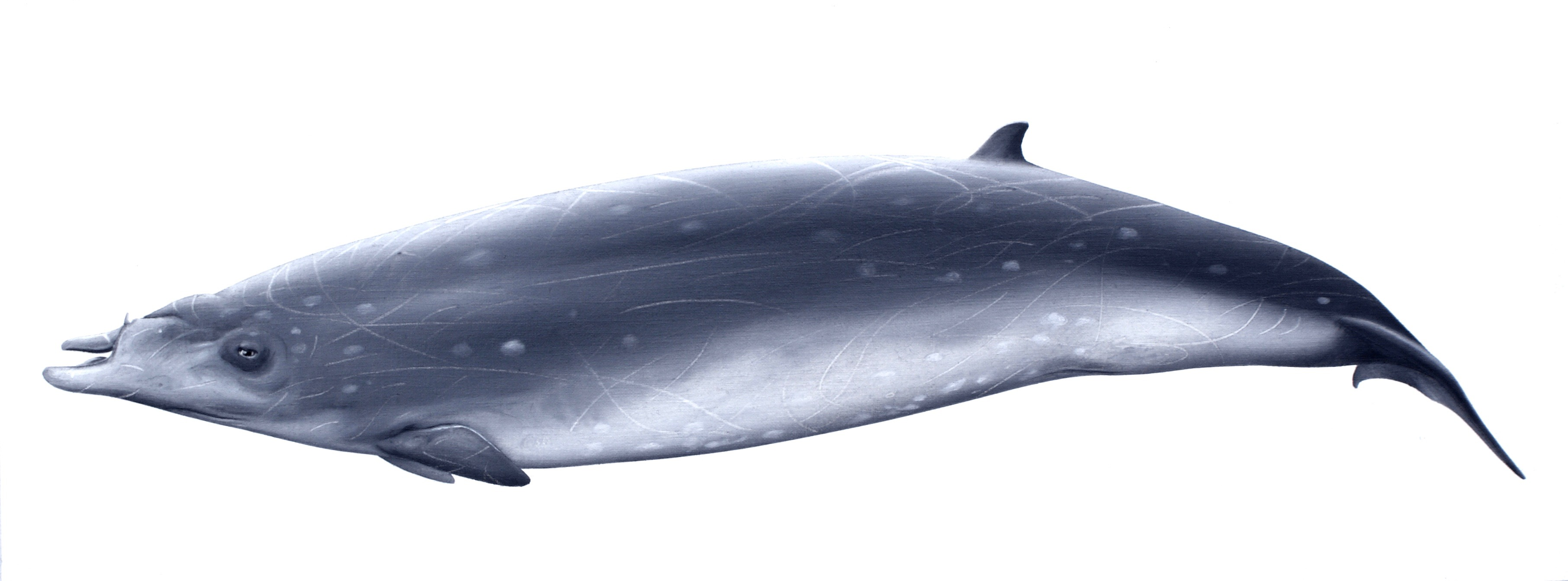

- Size compared to an average human

Conservation status
- Least Concern (IUCN 3.1)
- CITES Appendix II

Scientific classification
- Kingdom: Animalia
- Phylum: Chordata
- Class: Mammalia
- Order: Artiodactyla
- Infraorder: Cetacea
- Family: Ziphiidae
- Genus: Mesoplodon
- Species: M. densirostris

Binomial name
- Mesoplodon densirostris Blainville, 1817
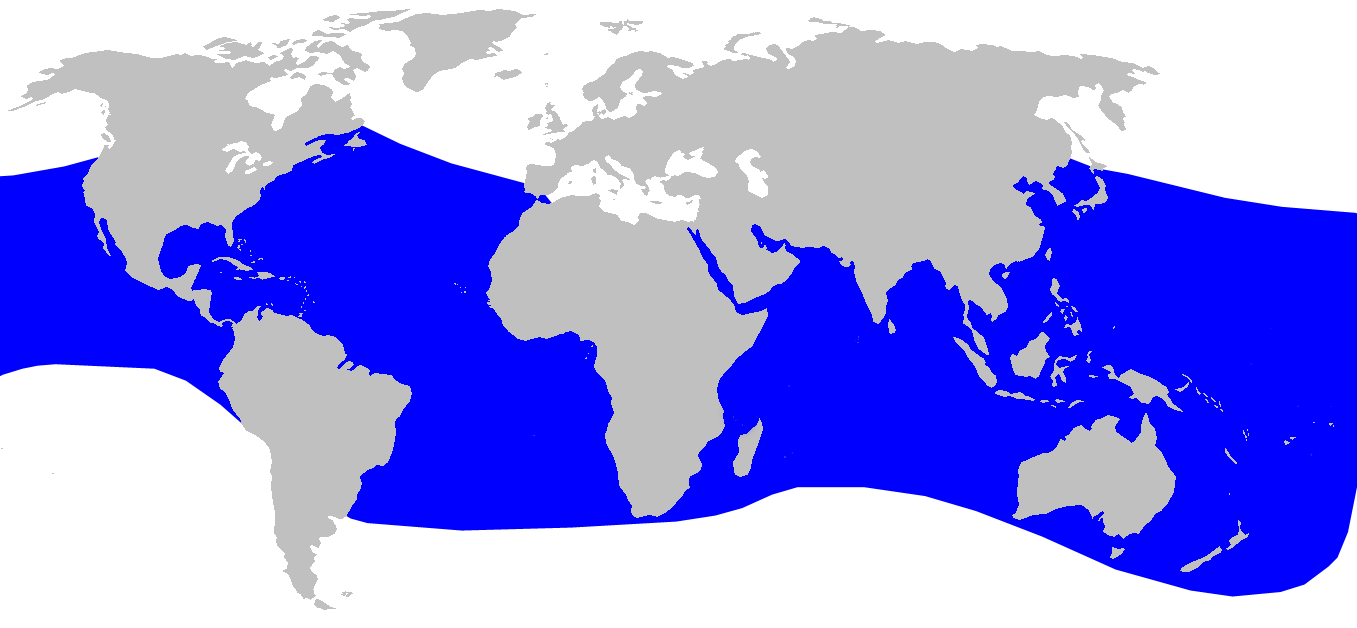
- Blainville's beaked whale range

= Blainville's beaked whale =

Species of mammal

Blainville's beaked whale (Mesoplodon densirostris), or the dense-beaked whale, is believed to be the widest ranging mesoplodont whale. The French zoologist Henri de Blainville first described the species in 1817 from a small piece of jaw—the heaviest bone he had ever come across—which resulted in the name densirostris (Latin for "dense beak"). Off the northeastern Bahamas, the animals are particularly well documented, and a photo identification project started sometime after 2002.

== Taxonomy ==
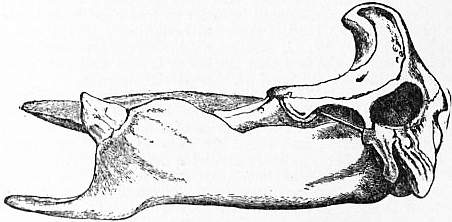
Skull of Blainville's beaked whale

In 1817, Blainville named the species Delphinus densirostris, based on the description of a nine-inch piece of rostrum of unknown origin housed in the Paris Museum. It became one of the first beaked whales to be identified. The second specimen, a complete skull sent from the Seychelles by a M. Leduc in 1839, was named Ziphius seychellensis by the English zoologist John Edward Gray in 1846; the French scientist Paul Gervais later placed this specimen in the genus Dioplodon ("two-toothed"). Sometimes called dense-beaked whale as the current Latin name (Mesoplodon densirostris) derives from densus for 'dense' and rostrum for 'beak' . For management purposes, Blainville's beaked whales inhabiting U.S. waters have been divided into the Hawaiian, northern Gulf of Mexico, and western North Atlantic stocks.

== Description ==
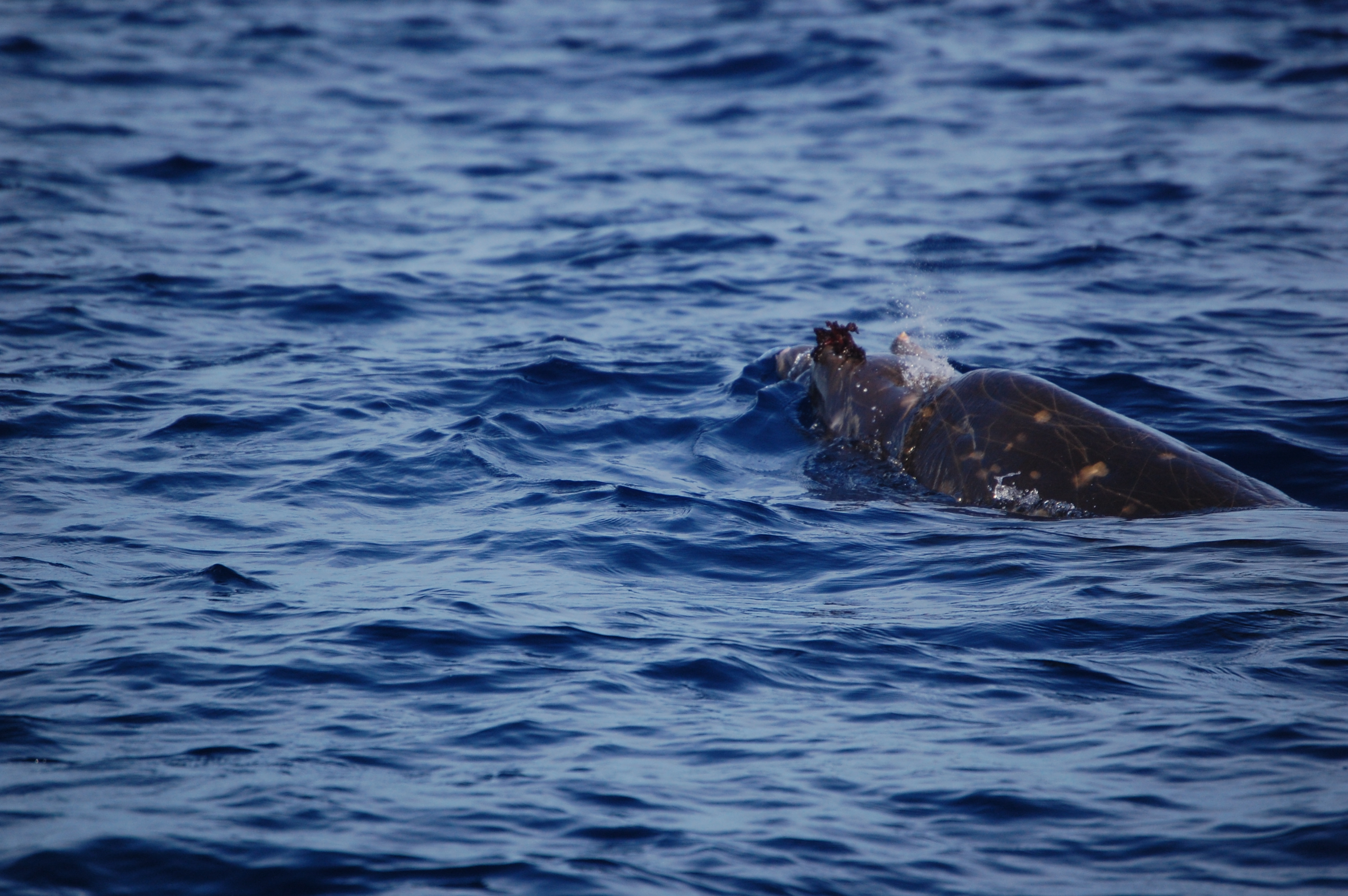
Teeth of an adult male

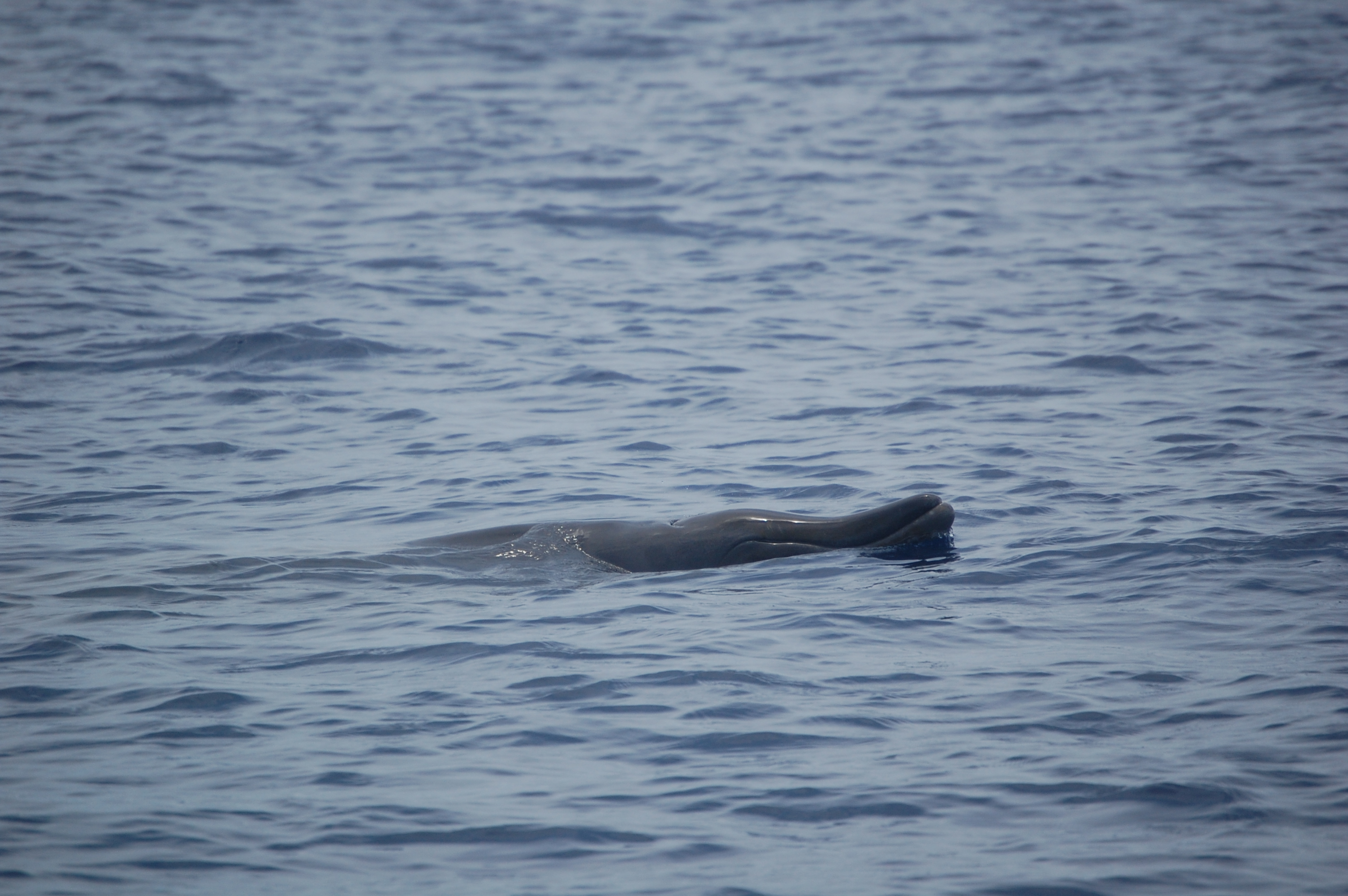
Mouth of an adult female

The body of Blainville's beaked whale is robust, but also somewhat compressed laterally compared with other mesoplodonts. The males have a highly distinctive appearance, the jaws overarch the rostrum, like a handful of other species, but does it towards the beginning of the mandible and then sloped down into a moderately long beak. In adult males the crown of a tooth erupts from each side of the lower jaw as they reach maturity. Barnacles are often attached to the exposed tooth. One of the more remarkable features of the whale is the extremely dense bones in the rostrum, which have a higher density and mechanical stiffness than any other bone yet measured. At present, the function of these bones is unknown, as the surrounding fat and the brittleness of the bone make it unlikely to be used for fighting. It has been suggested that it may play a role in echolocation or as ballast, but without sufficient behavioral observation, this cannot be confirmed. The melon of the whale is flat and comparatively small. Coloration is dark bluish grey on top and lighter gray on the bottom, and the head can be brownish shading to light grey around the lip and the jaw. Skin discoloration might be caused by diatoms. They might have white oval scars possibly caused by cookie-cutter sharks. Adult males can also have long white 'scratch' scars. Males reach at least 4.4 m (14 ft 5 in) and 800 kg (1,800 lb), whereas females reach at least 4.6 m (15') and 1 tonne (2200 pounds). Juveniles are 1.9 m (6 ft 3 in) long when born and weigh 60 kg (130 lb). No data on lifespan is available.

== Geographic range and distribution ==
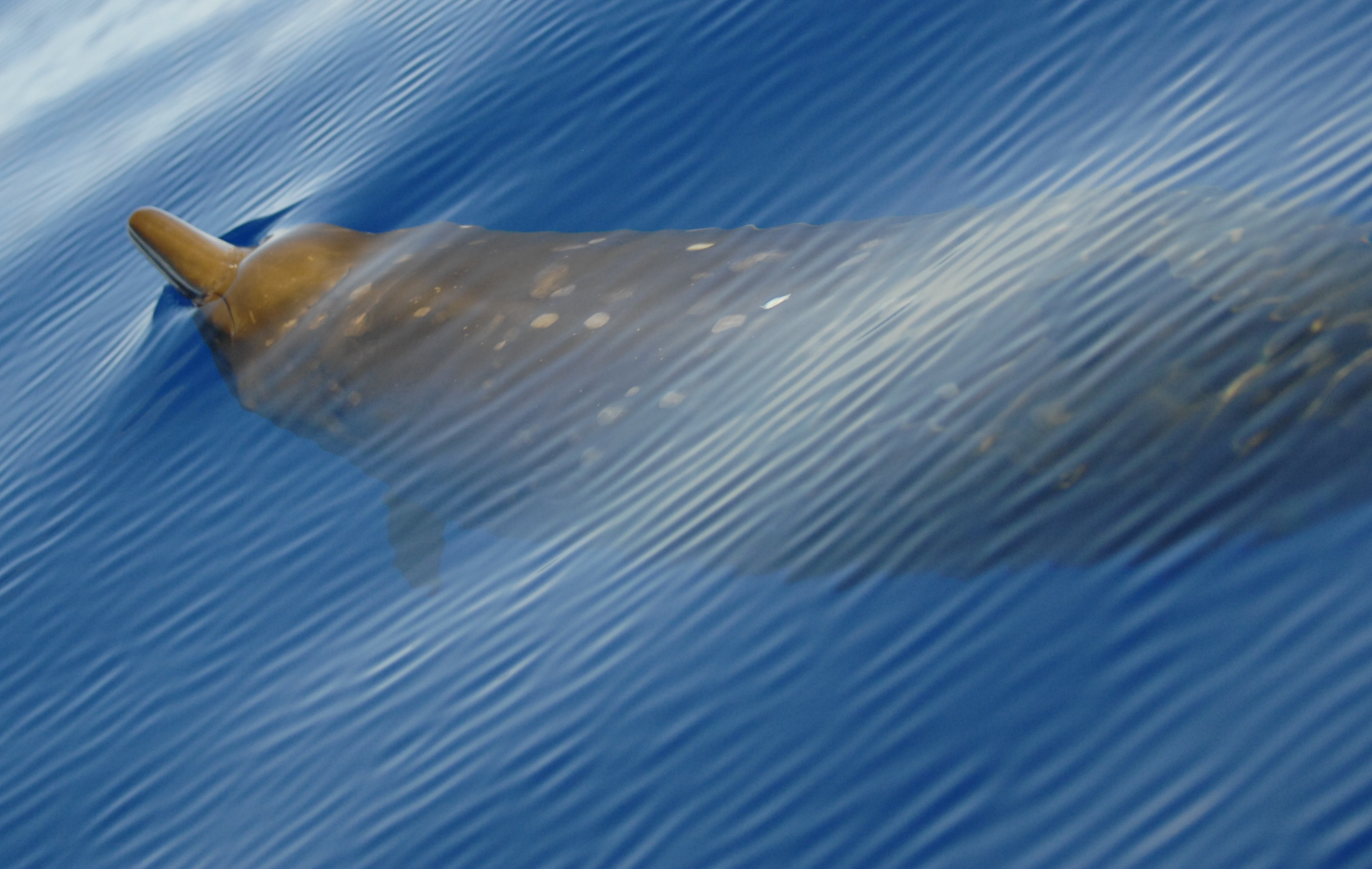
An adult whale surfacing in Bahamas

This species of beaked whale is found in tropical and warm waters in all oceans, and is considered to be the most extensively distributed member of Mesoplodon genus. Sightings occur in higher latitudes probably in relation to warm water currents such as Gulf Stream and the Agulhas Current. Groups are regularly seen in at least three locations: Waianae coast, Hawaii; Society Islands of the South Pacific; northeastern Bahamas.

The mean group size is 4.1 individuals. There is no evidence of seasonal migration. It inhabits deep, offshore water at depths of 200 to 1,000 m (656 to 3,281 ft) and is associated with steep underwater geological structures. Sub-adult males are found further offshore and in deeper water than adult males due to dominance hierarchy. Blainville's beaked whales have a long-term site fidelity meaning they return to the same area repeatedly or stay in the area for extended periods of time. Resight rate is higher for females than males as they are more likely to base their distribution based on prey abundance when males follow females to increase mating opportunity

== Behavior ==
=== Foraging ===
This species feeds primarily on squid and small fish and cephalopods. Recorded prey taxa include silver scabbardfish, hake, mantis shrimp, Octopoteuthis sicula, Histioteuthis meleagroteuthis and H. reversa, Taonius pavo, cod, lanternfish (Lampanyctus sp.), Cepola sp. and Scopelogadus sp.

Blainville's beaked whales do not capture prey by biting. They use suction feeding to capture prey. They create low pressure in the mouth by retracting tongue, and using throat grooves to expand throat volume. This creates a lower pressure in the mouth than the surrounding waters, allowing the whale to suck in water and whole prey.

Blainville's beaked whale shows similar foraging behaviour during the day and night; however, the time spent on surface is greater during the night.

=== Social behaviour ===
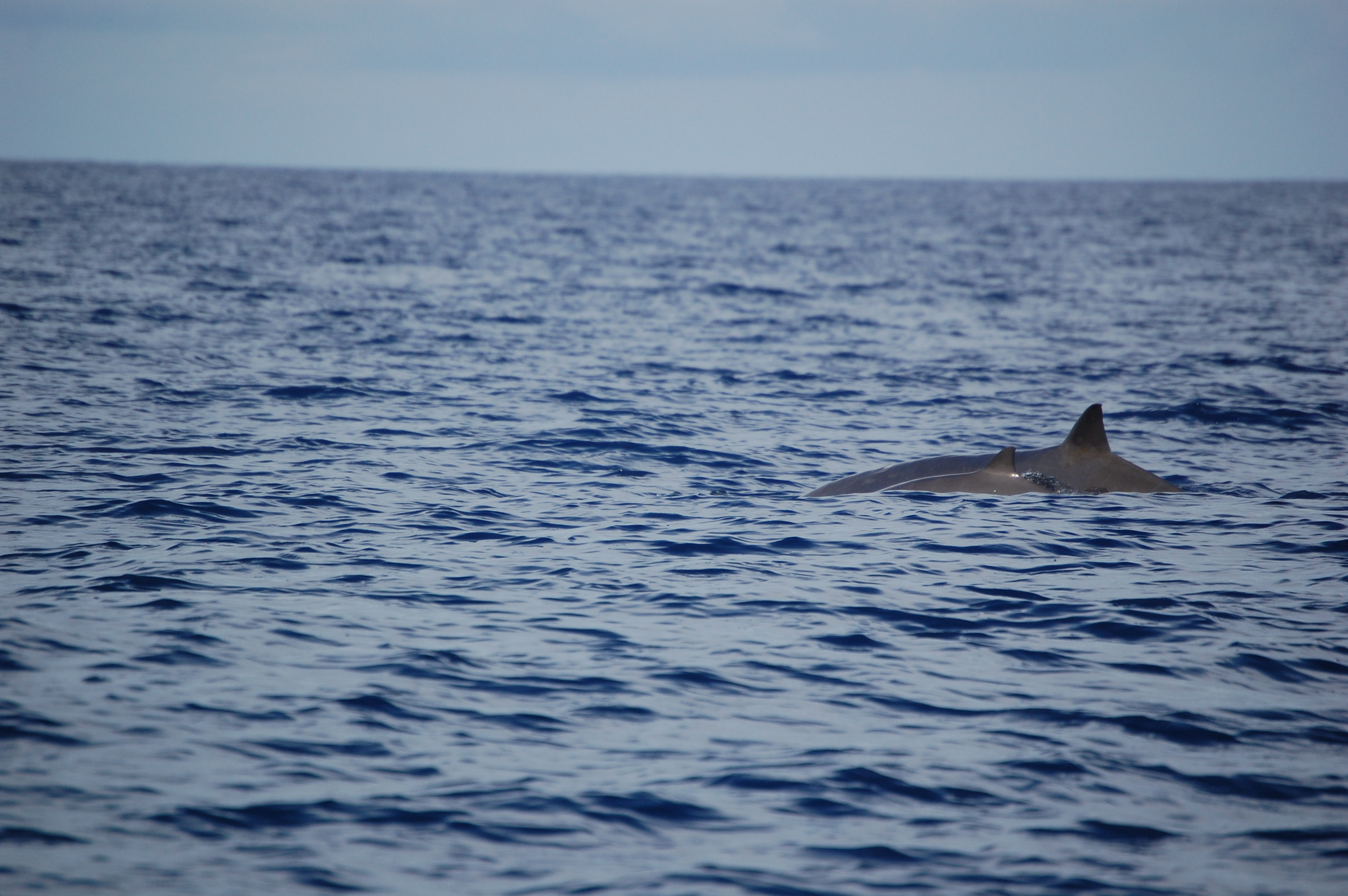
A cow–calf pair surfacing

Blainville's beaked whales can live in small cohesive groups of 3 to 7 individuals. Groups consist of both sexes and combination of ages or might be segregated. Harems of several females and a single mature male have been observed in productive continental shelf areas (eg. Bahamas). Males compete for females which probably causes scarring on individuals. The function of the group formation is protection (for females with small calves) and mating opportunity (for adult males).

Two signals were identified with possible communicative function: fast series of ultrasonic frequencies modulated by clicks and harmonical rich short whistles with mean fundamental frequency of 12 kHz. Because Blainville's beaked whales almost exclusively vocalize while on their dives, most believe that they are using sound to help their foraging. However, while on their dives they will produce whistles which are most commonly known for communication among odontocetes rather than echolocation for foraging.

Blainville's beaked whales remain silent for up to 80% of the time, especially in depth shallower than 170m and during silent ascent from vocal dives. This behaviour might be a protection mechanism against shallow-diving predators such as killer whales.

=== Migration and Movement ===
There is no evidence of seasonal migration.

Beaked whales are among the longest and deepest divers of any cetaceans. Mean diving depth for Blainville's beaked whale is 922 m (3,025 ft) with maximum 1,408 m (4,619 ft). The species dives primarily to forage for food in the deep ocean, usually diving over 800 m (2,600 ft) when foraging and can stay underwater for 48–68 min. For longer dives ascent rates are slower than descent rates. After a dive they spend an extensive period of time (66–155 min) in the upper 50 m (160 ft) of the water column.

In a study published in 2008, diving statistics of beaked whales were analyzed and no significant difference was found in diving behavior between day and night. For example, mean and max duration, number of deep dives, max depth, and ascent and descent rates were all calculated as equal during the day and night. However, the number of mid-depth dives was recorded to be six times higher during the day than at night. These results suggest that Blainville's beaked whales forage the same amount during the day and night, but switch to deeper-water prey at night.

=== Reproduction ===
Lifespan estimate is unknown. Sexual maturity might be reached at 9 years old. Calving interval and gestation period are unknown.

== Population status ==
NOAA Fisheries presents estimates of population size of U.S. stocks (Hawaiian, northern Gulf of Mexico, western North Atlantic) in stock assessment reports .

== Threats ==
=== Protection status ===
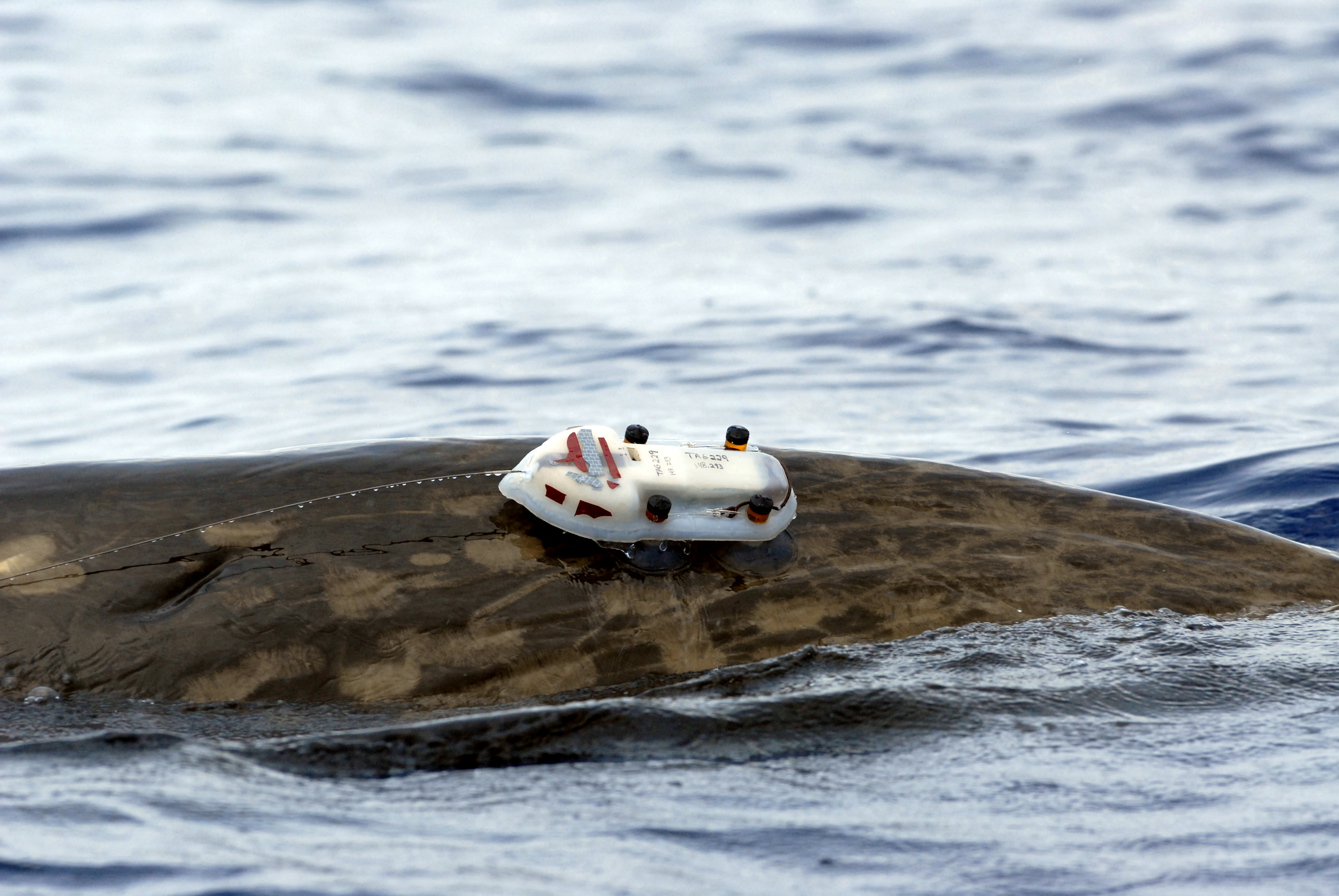
A male with an attached D-TAG for studying behavior swims in the U.S. Navy Atlantic Undersea Test and Evaluation Center testing range near Andros Island.

Blainville's Beaked Whale is protected throughout its range by CITES Appendix II and MMPA Protected. The Blainville's beaked whale is covered by the Agreement on the Conservation of Small Cetaceans of the Baltic Sea, North East Atlantic, Irish and North Seas (ASCOBANS) and the Agreement on the Conservation of Cetaceans in the Black Sea, Mediterranean Sea and Contiguous Atlantic Area (ACCOBAMS). The species is further included in the Memorandum of Understanding Concerning the Conservation of the Manatee and Small Cetaceans of Western Africa and Macaronesia (Western African Aquatic Mammals MoU) and the Memorandum of Understanding for the Conservation of Cetaceans and Their Habitats in the Pacific Islands Region (Pacific Cetaceans MoU).

=== Whaling ===
The beaked whale has occasionally been hunted, but has never been a specific target.

=== Noise pollution ===
Beaked whales are susceptible to detrimental effects of anthropogenic noise pollution because they use sound for hunting, communication and navigation. The broadband ship noise can cause a change in beaked whale behaviour up to 5.2 km from the boat. Whales have been reported to move away from the noise source and decrease their activity level. Sonar use during naval military activities have been associated with multiple strandings throughout their range. Infrequent and unpredictable noise is perceived as a threat and influences whale behaviour. Response is especially strong in noise-free areas where whales show avoidance of the noise which might be associated with life-threatening increased energetic costs.

=== Entanglement ===
Blainville's beaked whales are occasionally reported as a bycatch throughout its range.

=== Marine debris ===
Marine debris has been identified in the stomach of stranded Blainville's Beaked Whale. Marine debris ingestion was reported as a cause of death of beaked whales.

== Resources ==
For more information about ongoing work on Blainville's Beaked Whale check BMMRO and Cascadia Research Collective

== Specimens ==
- MNZ MM002350, collected Tongoia Beach, North of Napier, Hawke's Bay, New Zealand, 1998
- The Queensland Museum in Brisbane, Australia, has a full skeleton of an adult male on permanent display.

== See also ==
- List of cetaceans
