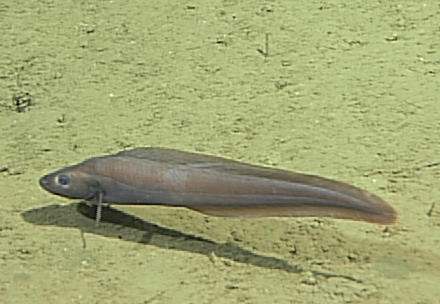
- Bothrocara brunneum

Scientific classification
- Kingdom: Animalia
- Phylum: Chordata
- Class: Actinopterygii
- Order: Perciformes
- Family: Zoarcidae
- Subfamily: Lycodinae
- Genus: Bothrocara; T. H. Bean, 1890

Type species
- Bothrocara mollis T. H. Bean, 1890

Species
- about 8, see text

Synonyms
- Allolepsis Jordan & Hubbs, 1925; Bothrocaropsis Garman, 1899; Lycogramma Gilbert, 1915; Zestichthys Jordan & Hubbs, 1925

= Bothrocara =

Genus of fishes

Bothrocara is a genus of marine ray-finned fishes belonging to the family Zoarcidae, the eelpouts. They are found in the Pacific Ocean, with one species reaching the southwestern Atlantic Ocean.

== Taxonomy ==
Bothrocara was first proposed as a monospecific genus in 1890 by the American ichthyologist Tarleton Hoffman Bean when he described Bothrocara mollis from Cape St. James, in Haida Gwaii, British Columbia. This genus is classified within the subfamily Lycodinae, one of four subfamilies in the family Zoarcidae, the eelpouts. This genus is the sister taxon to Bothrocarina, Lycodapus and Lycogrammoides, and these four genera form a clade within the subfamily Lycodinae.

== Etymology ==
Bothrocara is a compound of bothros, which means "pit" or "trench", and kara, meaning head, an allusion to the large pores along the jaws and reaching back to the operculum in B. mollis.

== Species ==
Species include:

- Bothrocara brunneum (T. H. Bean, 1890)
- Bothrocaropsis elongata Garman, 1899
- Bothrocara hollandi (Jordan & Hubbs, 1925)
- Bothrocara molle T. H. Bean, 1890
- Bothrocara nyx Stevenson & Anderson, 2005
- Bothrocara pusillum (T. H. Bean, 1890)
- Bothrocara soldatovi (Schmidt, 1950)
- Bothrocara tanakae (Jordan & Hubbs, 1925)
- Bothrocara zestum Jordan & Fowler, 1902

A review of the genus in 2011 placed B. elongata, B. nyx and B. pusillum in the genus Bentartia, and classified B. tanakae in the monospecific genus Zestichthys.

== Characteristics ==
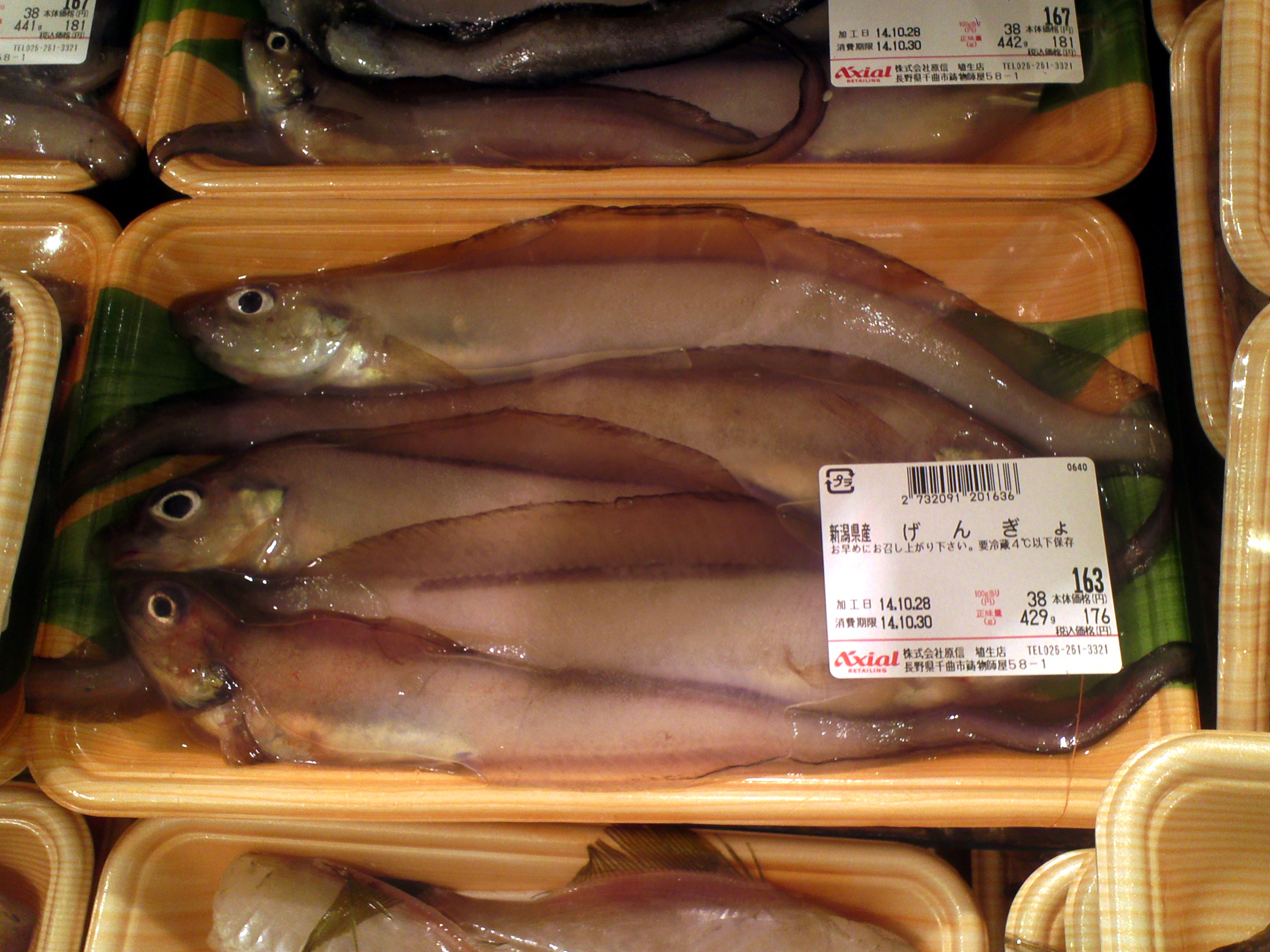
Bothrocara hollandi being sold in Japan

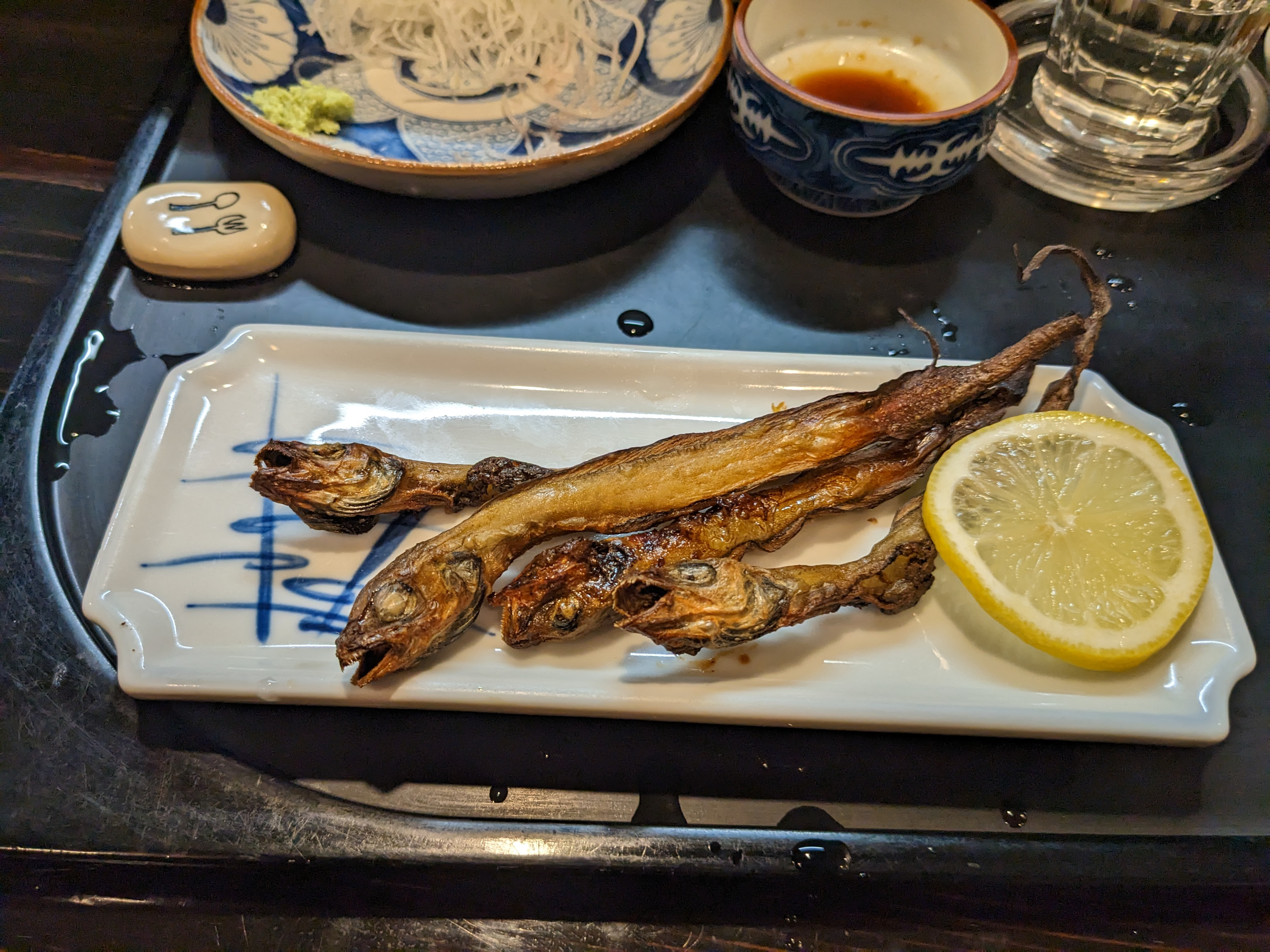
Dried Bothrocara hollandi served in Jōetsu City, Japan

Bothrocara eelpouts share the loss of an oral valve with the three sister taxa. They also share the absence of a pelvic fin, and, compared to other Lycodin eelpouts, they do not display marked sexual dimorphism. In his original description of the genus, Bean stated that it bore a resemblance to the genus Maynea, but lacked teeth on the vomer and palate, with the small teeth in the jaws being arranged in narrow bands, with very few on the lower jaw. There are six branchiostegals, and the gill membrane is narrowly attached to the isthmus. There are large pores along the jaws, which extend rearwards onto the operculum. The front part of the body is naked, with no scales. The dorsal fin has its origin over the that of the pectoral fin, and is continuous with the anal fin. However, later authors state that these fish do have vomerine and palatine teeth, and that most species, other than the type species, are extensively scaled.

These fishes range in size from a maximum published standard length of 14.5 cm (5.7 in) in B. pusillum to 64.5 cm (25.4 in) in B. tanakae.

== Distribution and habitat ==
Bothrocara eelpouts are mainly found in the northern Pacific Ocean, with one species, B. elongatum, being found in the eastern central Pacific Ocean as far south as Chile, and another B. molle extending into the southwestern Atlantic Ocean. They are demersal fish, and can be found in shallow and deep water, mainly along continental slopes.
