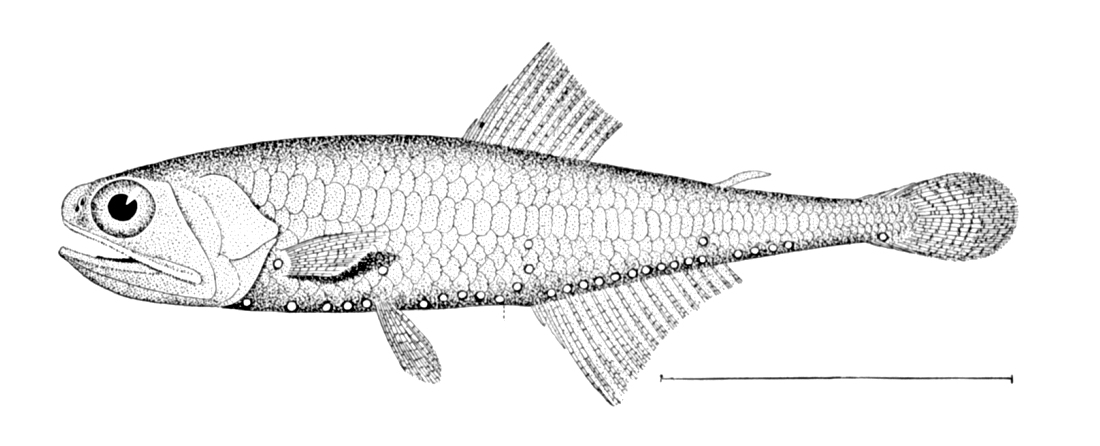

Scientific classification
- Domain: Eukaryota
- Kingdom: Animalia
- Phylum: Chordata
- Class: Actinopterygii
- Order: Myctophiformes
- Family: Myctophidae
- Genus: Tarletonbeania
- Species: T. crenularis

Binomial name
- Tarletonbeania crenularis D.S. Jordan & C. H. Gilbert, 1880

= Tarletonbeania crenularis =

Species of fish

Tarletonbeania crenularis is a species of lanternfish. The first member of this species was retrieved by Dr. Tarleton H. Bean off of Vancouver Island in 1880, which is where the genus name originates from. The species name comes from the Latin word for a small notch (crenula), and this refers to the slight notch seen at the edges of the scales.
