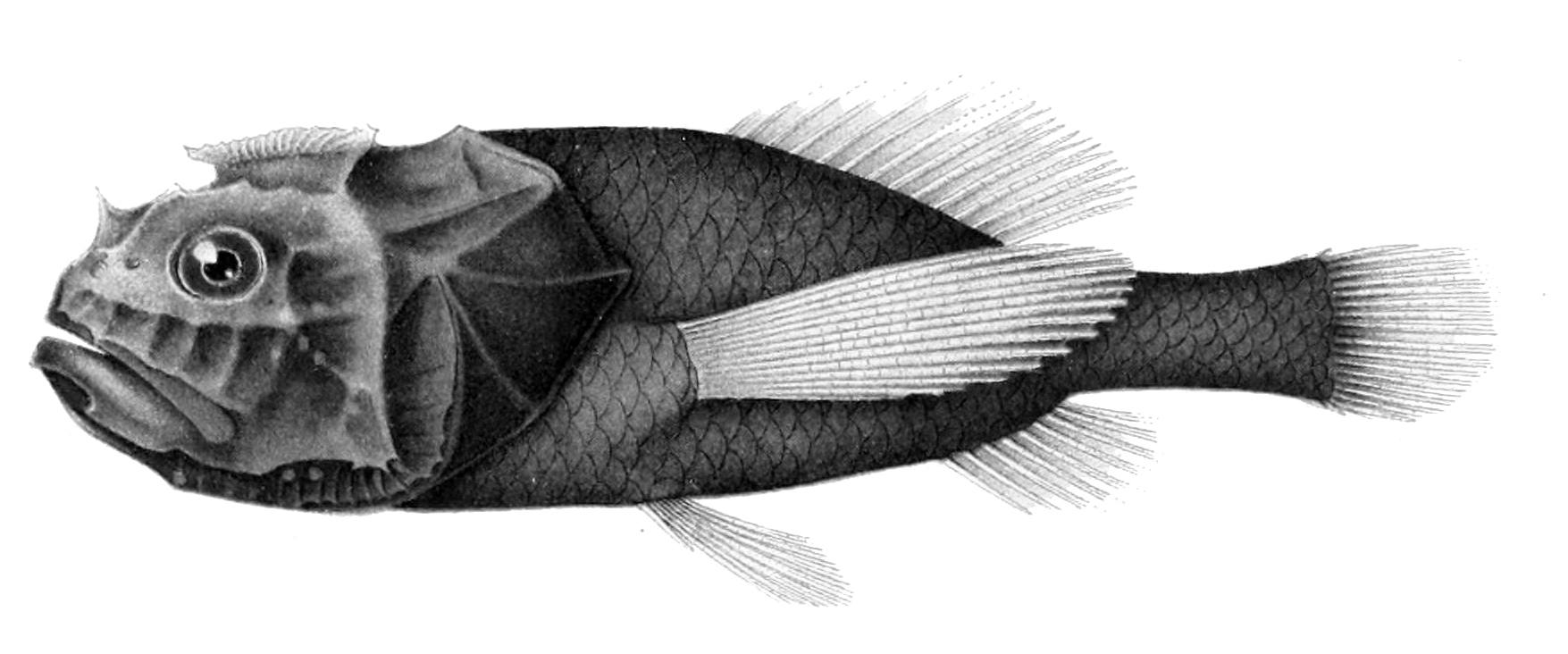
- P. unicornis
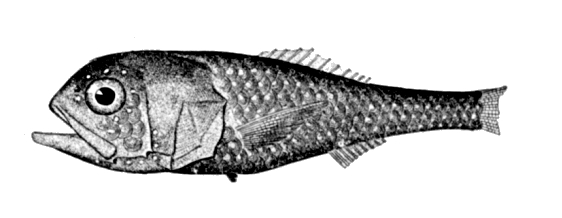
- P. capito

Scientific classification
- Kingdom: Animalia
- Phylum: Chordata
- Class: Actinopterygii
- Division: Teleostei
- Order: Beryciformes
- Family: Melamphaidae
- Genus: Poromitra; Goode & T. H. Bean, 1883

= Poromitra =

Genus of fishes

Poromitra is a genus of ridgeheads. The 22 known species of Poromitra have been divided into five species groups according to variation in preopercle anatomy.

A Poromitra curilensis specimen from the Shirshov Institute of Oceanology, obtained on October 7, 1968, marks the first discovery of a Poromitra member in the southeastern Pacific Ocean.

== Species ==
There are currently 21 recognized species in this genus:

- Poromitra atlantica (Norman, 1929)
- Poromitra capito Goode & T. H. Bean, 1883
- Poromitra coronata (Gilchrist & von Bonde, 1924)
- Poromitra crassa Parin & Ebeling, 1980
- Poromitra crassiceps (Günther, 1878) (Crested bigscale)
- Poromitra cristiceps (C. H. Gilbert, 1890)
- Poromitra curilensis Kotlyar, 2008
- Poromitra decipiens Kotlyar, 2008
- Poromitra frontosa (Garman, 1899)
- Poromitra gibbsi Parin & Borodulina, 1989
- Poromitra glochidiata Kotlyar, 2008
- Poromitra indooceanica Kotlyar, 2008
- Poromitra jucunda Kotlyar, 2010
- Poromitra kukuevi Kotlyar, 2008
- Poromitra macrophthalma (Gilchrist, 1903)
- Poromitra megalops (Lütken, 1878)
- Poromitra nigriceps (Zugmayer, 1911)
- Poromitra nigrofulva (Garman, 1899)
- Poromitra oscitans Ebeling, 1975 (Yawning)
- Poromitra rugosa (W. M. Chapman, 1939)
- Poromitra unicornis (C. H. Gilbert, 1905)
