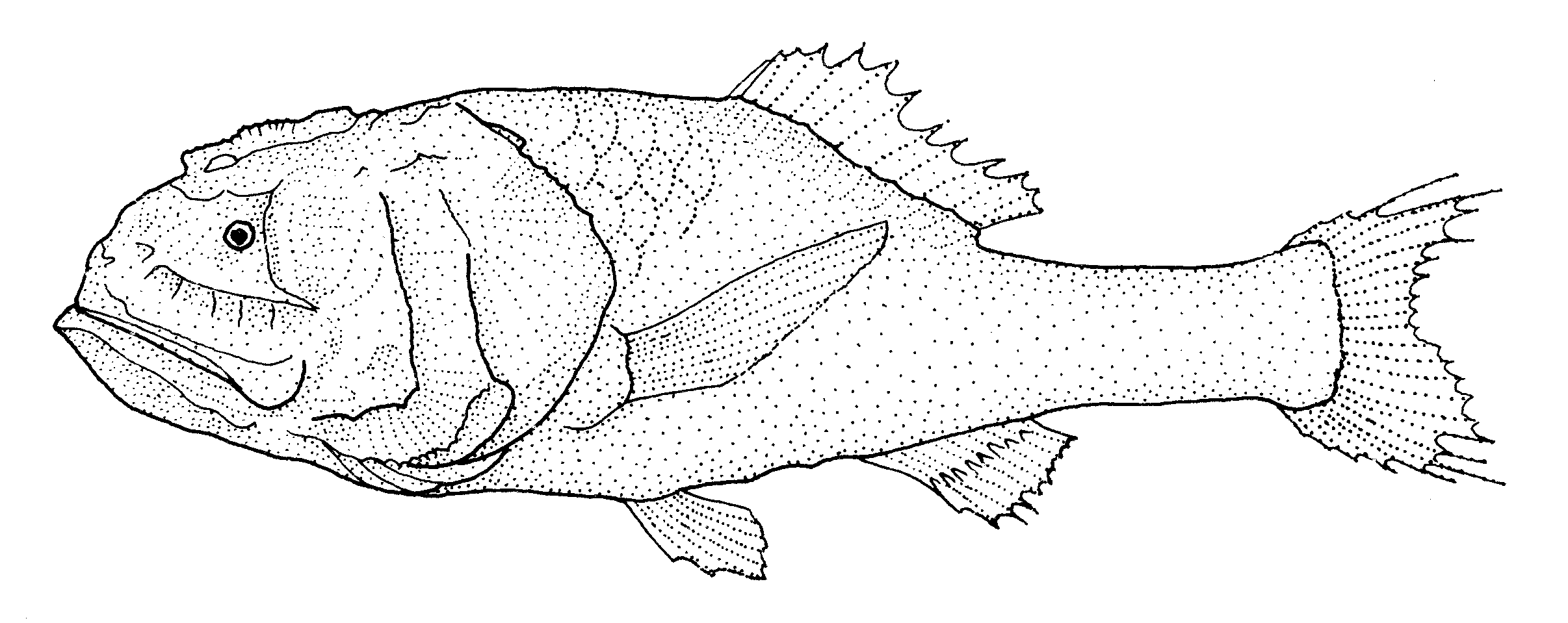
- Drawing by Dr Tony Ayling

Conservation status
- Least Concern (IUCN 3.1)

Scientific classification
- Kingdom: Animalia
- Phylum: Chordata
- Class: Actinopterygii
- Order: Beryciformes
- Family: Melamphaidae
- Genus: Poromitra
- Species: P. oscitans

Binomial name
- Poromitra oscitans Ebeling, 1975

= Poromitra oscitans =

Species of fish

Poromitra oscitans, the yawning, is a fish of the family Melamphaidae, found in tropical and subtropical waters of the Indo-Pacific region. It grows to a length of 8.2 cm (3.2 in) SL, and lives at a depth of 643–5,320 m (2,110–17,454 ft).
