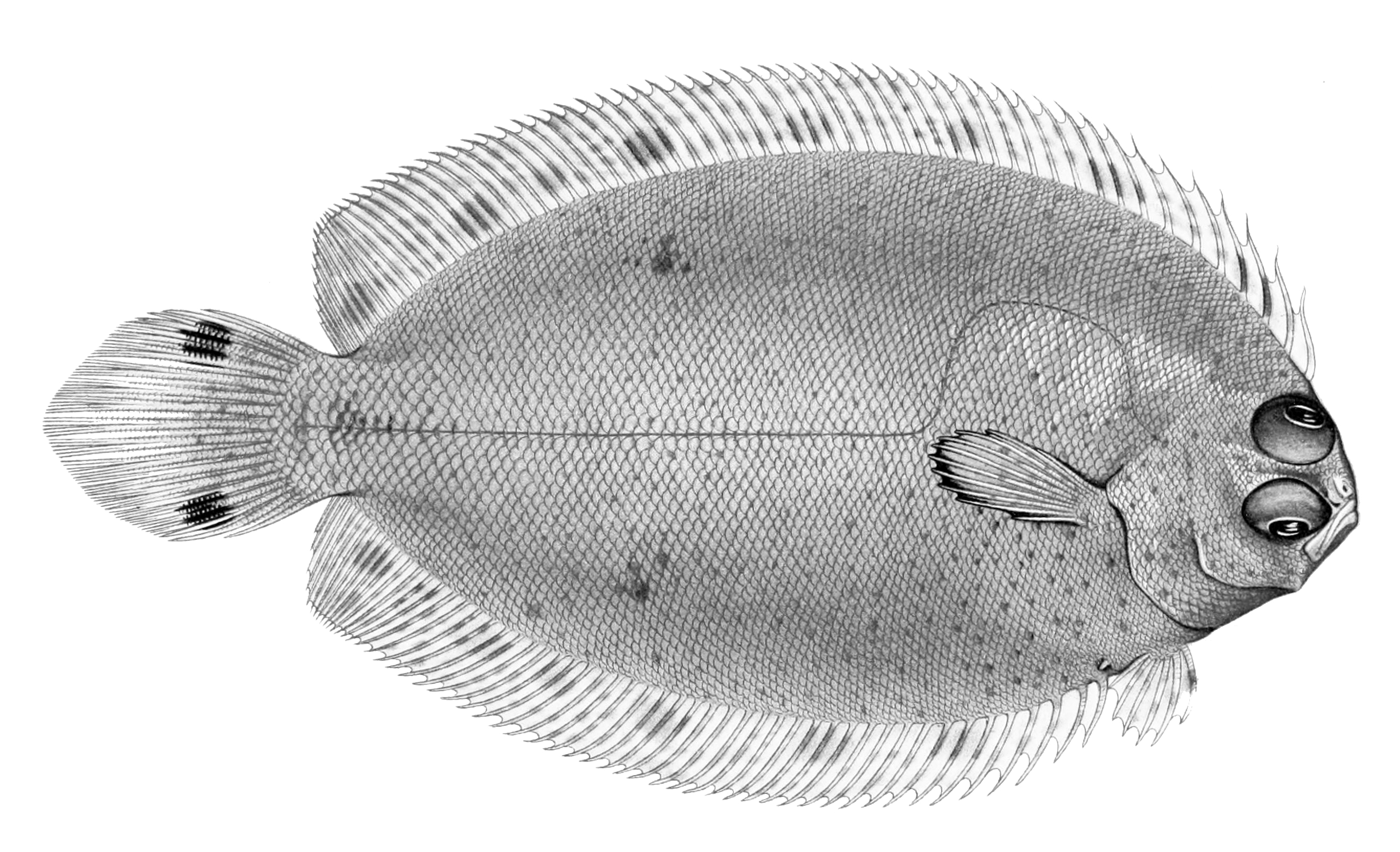

Scientific classification
- Kingdom: Animalia
- Phylum: Chordata
- Class: Actinopterygii
- Order: Carangiformes
- Suborder: Pleuronectoidei
- Family: Poecilopsettidae
- Genus: Poecilopsetta
- Species: P. hawaiiensis

Binomial name
- Poecilopsetta hawaiiensis Gilbert, 1905

= Poecilopsetta hawaiiensis =

Hawaiian righteye flounder

Species of fish

Poecilopsetta hawaiiensis is a flatfish of the family Pleuronectidae. It is endemic to the Hawaiian Islands.
