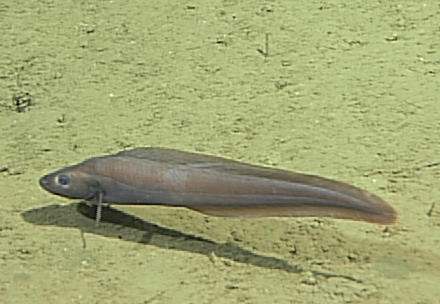
- B. brunneum swimming by a seabed.

Scientific classification
- Kingdom: Animalia
- Phylum: Chordata
- Class: Actinopterygii
- Division: Teleostei
- Order: Perciformes
- Family: Zoarcidae
- Genus: Bothrocara
- Species: B. brunneum

Binomial name
- Bothrocara brunneum (T. H. Bean, 1890)

Synonyms
- Bothrocaropsis rictolata Garman, 1899; Maynea brunnea T. H. Bean, 1890

= Bothrocara brunneum =

Species of fish

Bothrocara brunneum, the twoline eelpout, is a bathydemersal species of fish of the family Zoarcidae. The species is the only fish of the eelpouts to have two lateral lines and short blunt-ended gill rakers. The species has a wide range across the northeastern Pacific Ocean, between the Bering Sea and the shores of San Francisco, and from Attu Island to the Baja California Peninsula.

It inhabits the bottom of seas or oceans and is generally found at a depth ranging between 2,000 feet (610 m) and 6,000 feet (1,829 m). The species has also been studied to have shown a relationship between the season and its population increase and decrease, with the summer seasons being its highest and the winter seasons being the decrease in population size. It has been hypothesized from an analysis of stomach content that the species feeds mainly on bottom-dwelling creatures. Etymologically, Bothrocara stands for "cavity head" and brunneum for "brown", named respectively after the appearance of the head and the tinted brown colour of the body. It was named "twoline eelpout" for its unique two lateral lines.

== Description ==
The twoline eelpout has been found to have two lateral lines, the only one of its family, and also has a small blunt-ended gill raker. Its dorsal and anal fins are covered in a gelatinous tissue. Twoline eelpouts are bathydemersal (below 650 feet), and can generally be found at a depth between 2,000 feet (610 m) and 6,000 feet (1,829 m). The fecundity is about 215–329 eggs for females measuring 414–617 mm (16.3–24.3 in) total length.

== Feeding habits ==
It has been hypothesized that, judging by an analysis of stomach content, the species feeds primarily on bottom-dwelling creatures, habitually eating anything it comes across that has food value and that is small enough to ingest.

== Bibliography ==
- Ferry, Lara A. (1994). Natural history of two-line eelpouts (Bothrocara brunneum, family Zoarcidae) (Master thesis). San Francisco State University.
- Fitch, John E. & R.J. Lavenberg (1968). Deep-Water Teleostean Fishes of California. University of California Press.
