= Bentartia =

Scientific classification
- Kingdom: Animalia
- Phylum: Chordata
- Class: Actinopterygii
- Order: Perciformes
- Family: Zoarcidae
- Subfamily: Lycodinae
- Genus: Bentartia; Matallanas, 2010
- Species: B. cinerea

Binomial name
- Bentartia cinerea Matallanas, 2010

Genus of fishes

Bentartia is a genus of marine ray-finned fish belonging to the family Zoarcidae, the eelpouts. Some authorities treat this genus as monospecific, with the only species being Bentartia cinerea of the Southern Ocean, but other authorities include 4 species from the eastern Pacific Ocean.

== Taxonomy ==
Bentartia was first proposed as a genus by the Argentinian zoologist Jésus Matallanas when he described its only species B. ciberea with a type locality given as the Gerlache Strait in the Southern Ocean at 64°32'58"S, 61°97'38"W from a depth of 1,056 m (3,465 ft). This genus is classified within the subfamily Lycodinae, one of 4 subfamilies in the family Zoarcidae, the eelpouts.

== Etymology ==
Bentartia is named after BENTART, the Spanish expeditions to the Antarctic, the holotype of B. cinerea was collected during these expeditions.

== Species ==
Fishbase only recognises one species, B. cinerea, within the genus but other authorities recognise the following species:

- Bentartia cinerea Matallanas, 2010
- Bentartia elongata (Garman, 1899)
- Bentartia nyx (Stevenson & Anderson, 2005)
- Bentartia pusillum (Bean, 1890)

The other three species are included in Bothrocara by Fishbase.

== Distribution and habitat ==
Bentartia, as B. cinerea, was originally described from the Gerlache Strait. The other species which have since been assigned to this genus are found in the eastern Pacific between the Bering Strait in the north and Chile in the south. They are bathydemersal and bathypelagic fishes.
