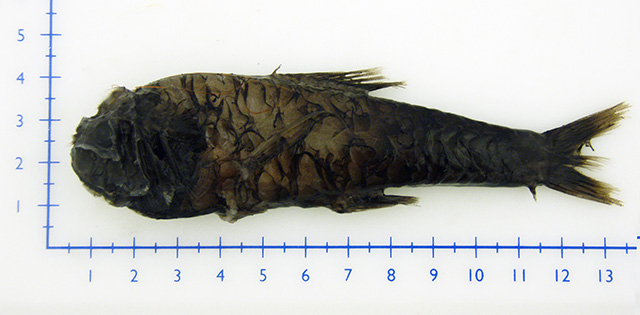

Conservation status
- Data Deficient (IUCN 3.1)

Scientific classification
- Kingdom: Animalia
- Phylum: Chordata
- Class: Actinopterygii
- Order: Beryciformes
- Family: Melamphaidae
- Genus: Scopelogadus
- Species: S. beanii

Binomial name
- Scopelogadus beanii (Günther, 1887)

Synonyms
- Melamphaes beanii Günther, 1887; Melamphaes eurylepis Holt & Byrne, 1906; Plectromus beanii Günther, 1887; Plectromus crassiceps Bean, 1885; Scopelogadus beani Günther, 1887

= Scopelogadus beanii =

Species of fish

Scopelogadus beanii, or Bean's bigscale, is a species of ridgehead fish. It is named for Tarleton Hoffman Bean.

== Description ==
Bean's bigscale is dark brown or black in colour, with a maximum length of 12.2 cm (4.8 in). It is one of the largest and deepest-dwelling ridgeheads. It has two dorsal spines, one anal spine, 10–11 dorsal soft rays and 7–9 anal soft rays. Its caudal peduncle (the tapered region behind the dorsal and anal fins where the caudal fin attaches to the body) is long. It has ridges of thin bones supporting deep mucous cavities on the head.

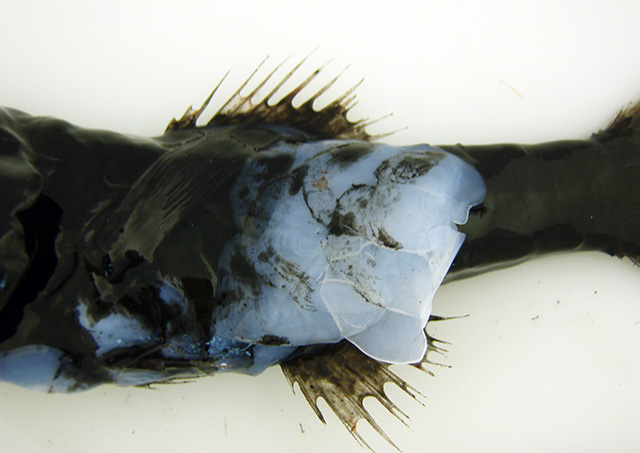
Bean's bigscale has very large, weakly attached cycloid scales that are often lost during capture.

== Habitat ==
Bean's bigscale is mesopelagic and bathypelagic, living at depths of up to 2,500 m (8,200 ft), and is common in the Atlantic Ocean, Pacific Ocean, Indian Ocean and Tasman Sea.

== Behaviour ==
Scopelogadus beanii feeds on amphipods, polychaetes, jellyfish and mysids.
