= Comb flounder =

Scientific classification
- Kingdom: Animalia
- Phylum: Chordata
- Class: Actinopterygii
- Order: Carangiformes
- Suborder: Pleuronectoidei
- Family: Pleuronectidae
- Genus: Marleyella
- Species: M. bicolorata

Binomial name
- Marleyella bicolorata (von Bonde, 1922)
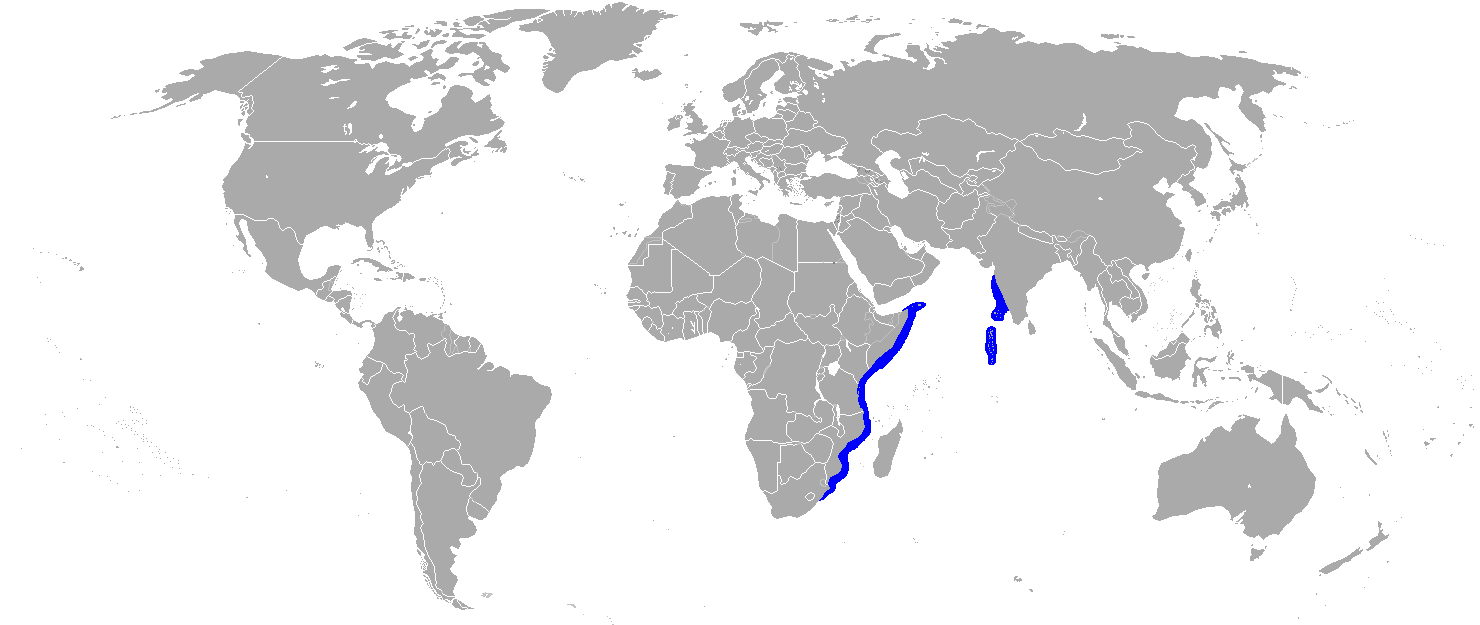
- Distribution of the comb flounder

Synonyms
- Poecilopsetta bicolorata von Bonde, 1922

Species of fish

The comb flounder (Marleyella bicolorata) is a flatfish of the family Pleuronectidae. It is a demersal fish that lives on saltwater bottoms at depths of between 20 and 406 metres (66 and 1,332 ft). Its natural habitat is the tropical waters of the western Indian Ocean, from KwaZulu-Natal and Mozambique in Southern Africa, to coastal Tanzania and Kenya in the African Great Lakes region, to Somalia in the Horn of Africa, to Karnataka and Maharashtra in India. It can grow up to 19 centimetres (7.5 in) in length.

== Description ==
The comb flounder is a right-eyed flatfish. Its upper (eyed) side is dark brown, marked with vaguely cruciform dark spots and blotches, with round black spots on the head and a dark bar at the base of the caudal fin. The underside is also dark brown.
