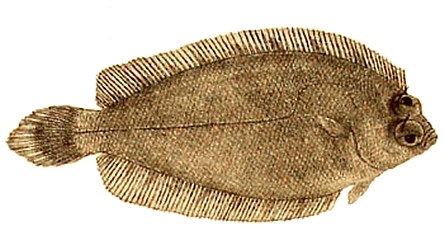

Scientific classification
- Domain: Eukaryota
- Kingdom: Animalia
- Phylum: Chordata
- Class: Actinopterygii
- Order: Carangiformes
- Suborder: Pleuronectoidei
- Family: Pleuronectidae
- Genus: Nematops
- Species: N. microstoma

Binomial name
- Nematops microstoma Günther, 1880
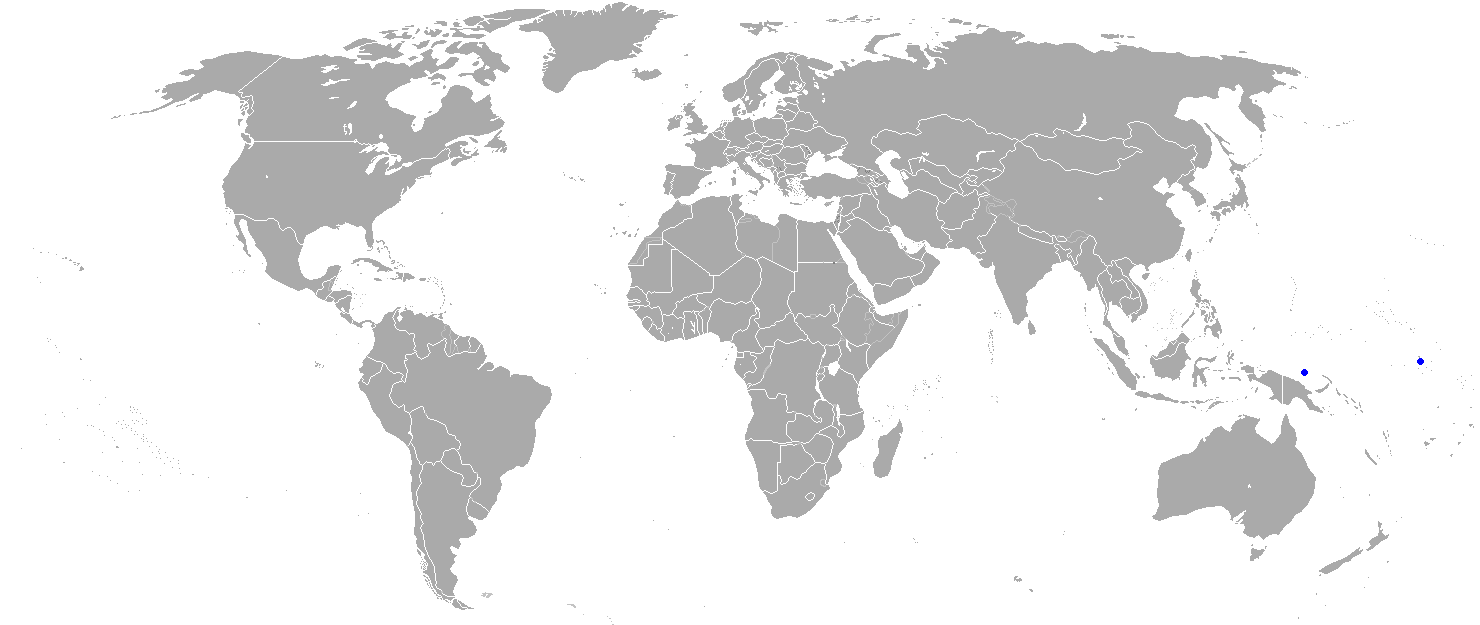
- The two locations at which the small-mouth righteye flounder has been found - the Admiralty Islands and the Gilbert Islands

= Small-mouth righteye flounder =

Species of fish

The small-mouth righteye flounder (Nematops microstoma) is a flatfish of the family Pleuronectidae. It is a demersal fish that lives on saltwater bottoms from depths of 304 metres (997 ft). Its natural habitat is the tropical waters of the southwest Pacific. It can grow up to 10 centimetres (3.9 in) in length.

== Range ==
As of 2011 the small-mouth righteye flounder has been discovered at only two locations, both in the southwest Pacific: the Admiralty Islands, where it was first described by Albert Günther in 1880, and the Gilbert Islands.

== Description ==
The large-scale right-eye flounder is, as its name suggests, a right-eyed flatfish. It has a slender body, 2.3 times long as it is wide, with a short pectoral fin.

== Diet ==
The diet of the large-scale right-eye flounder consists of small zoobenthos organisms.

== Nomenclature ==
The species name, microstoma, is derived from the Greek μικρὸς (mikros), meaning "small", and στόμα (stoma), meaning "mouth".
