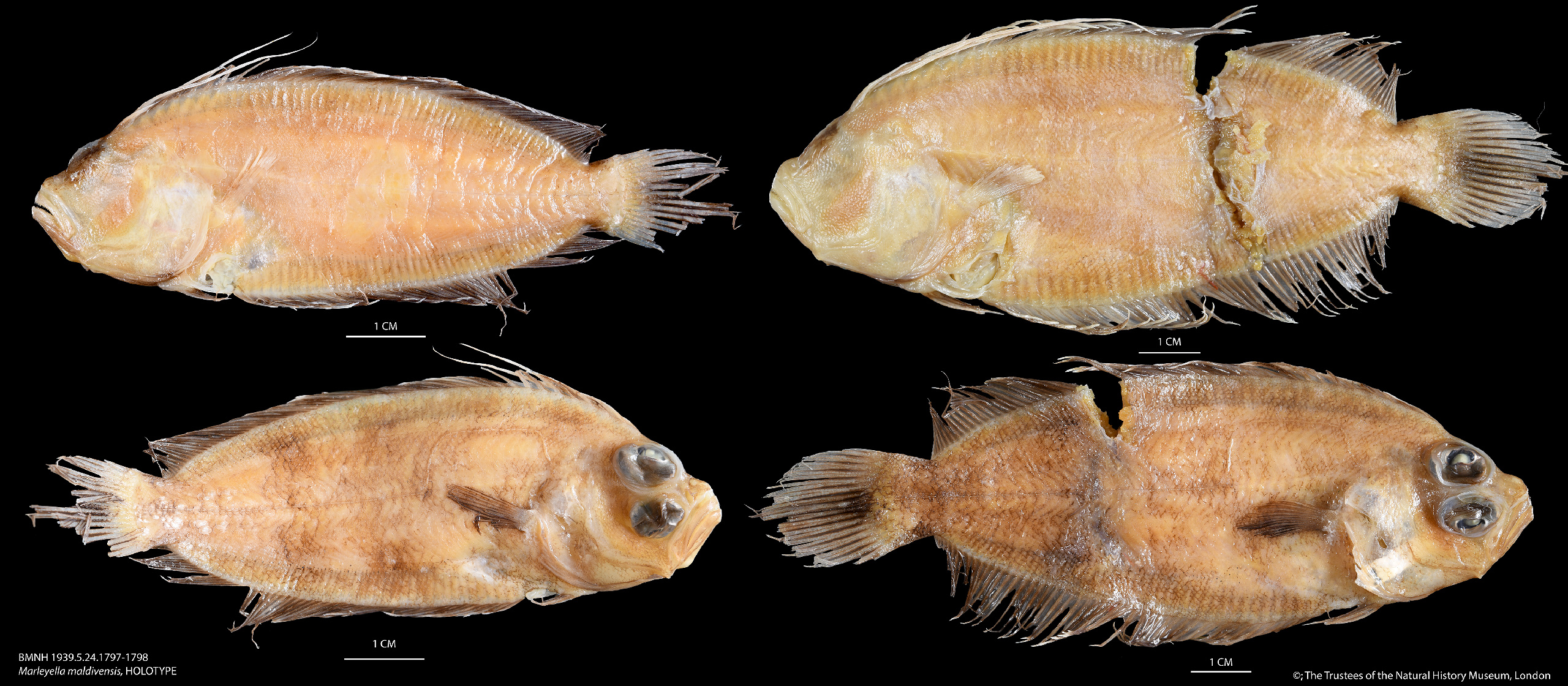
- Marleyella maldivensis

Scientific classification
- Kingdom: Animalia
- Phylum: Chordata
- Class: Actinopterygii
- Order: Carangiformes
- Suborder: Pleuronectoidei
- Family: Pleuronectidae
- Subfamily: Poecilopsettinae
- Genus: Marleyella; Fowler, 1925

Type species
- Poecilopsetta bicolorata von Bonde, 1922

= Marleyella =

Genus of fishes

Marleyella is a genus of righteye flounders native to the western Indian Ocean where found at depths ranging from the shallows to more than 400 m (1,300 ft).

== Species ==
There are currently two recognized species in this genus:

- Marleyella bicolorata (von Bonde, 1922) (Comb flounder)
- Marleyella maldivensis Norman, 1939
