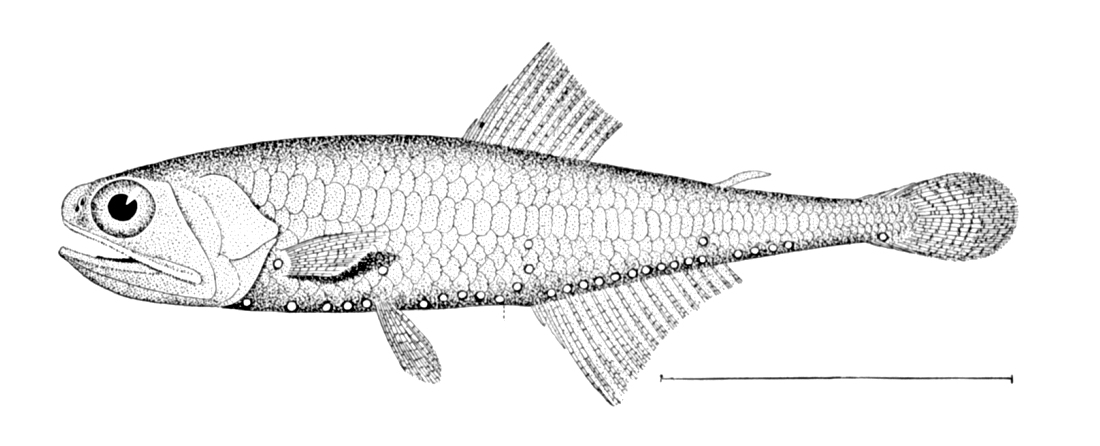
- Blue Lanternfish (T. crenularis)

Scientific classification
- Kingdom: Animalia
- Phylum: Chordata
- Class: Actinopterygii
- Division: Teleostei
- Order: Myctophiformes
- Family: Myctophidae
- Genus: Tarletonbeania; C. H. Eigenmann & R. S. Eigenmann, 1890

= Tarletonbeania =

Genus of fishes

Tarletonbeania is a genus of lanternfishes found in the Pacific Ocean.

== Etymology ==
The genus is named after ichthyologist Tarleton H. Bean (1846–1916), of the U.S. National Museum.

== Species ==
There are currently three recognized species in this genus:

- Tarletonbeania crenularis (D. S. Jordan & C. H. Gilbert, 1880) (Blue lanternfish)
- Tarletonbeania taylori Mead, 1953
- Tarletonbeania tenua C. H. Eigenmann & Eigenmann, 1891
