= Sio nordenskjoldii =

Conservation status
- Least Concern (IUCN 3.1)

Scientific classification
- Kingdom: Animalia
- Phylum: Chordata
- Class: Actinopterygii
- Order: Beryciformes
- Family: Melamphaidae
- Genus: Sio; Moss, 1962
- Species: S. nordenskjoldii

Binomial name
- Sio nordenskjoldii (Lönnberg, 1905)

Synonyms
- Melamphaes (Plectromus) nordenskjoldii Lönnberg, 1905

Species of fish

Sio is a monotypic genus of fish in the family Melamphaidae, the ridgeheads. The only species is Sio nordenskjoldii, or Nordenskjold's bigscale. It has a circumglobal distribution on the southern hemisphere at depths from 200 to 3,000 metres (660 to 9,840 ft).

== Etymology ==
The genus names refers to the Scripps Institute of Oceanography, abbreviated as SIO.

== Description ==
This species grows to a length of 12.3 centimetres (4.8 in) SL.

== Conservation ==
There are no known threats to this species. It is not caught by commercial fisheries.
