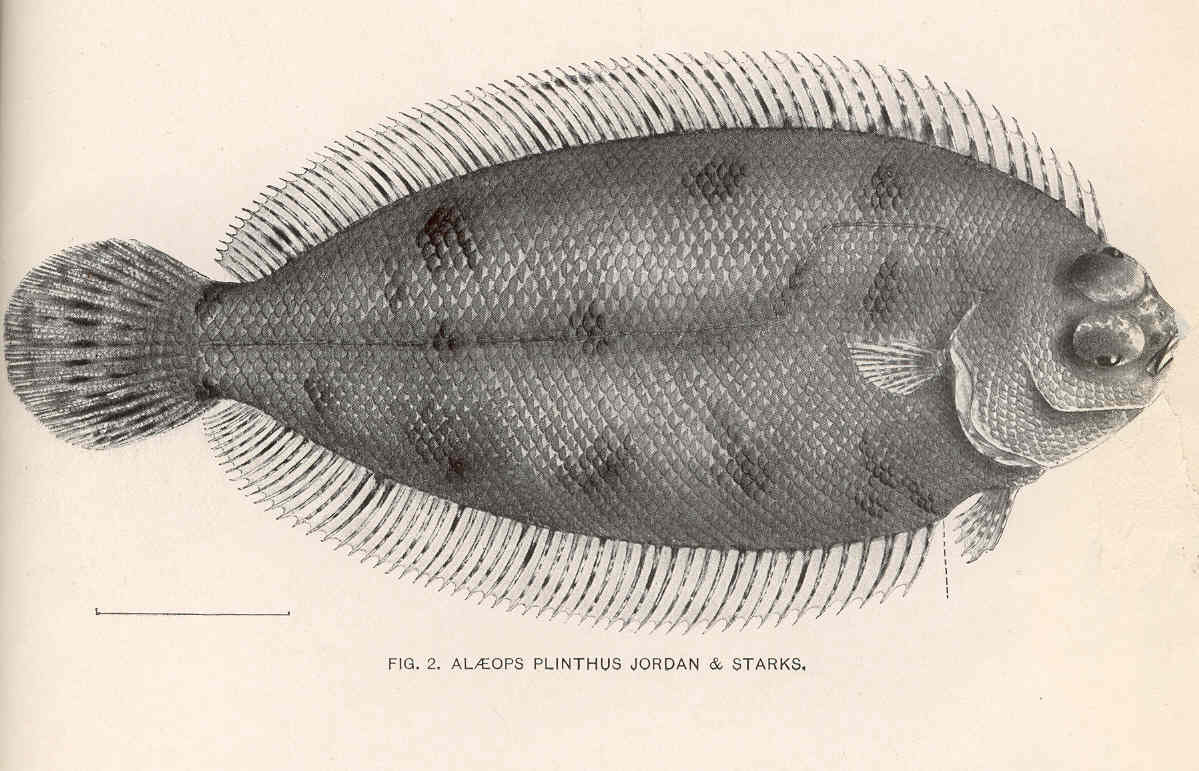
- Poecilopsetta plinthus

Scientific classification
- Domain: Eukaryota
- Kingdom: Animalia
- Phylum: Chordata
- Class: Actinopterygii
- Order: Carangiformes
- Suborder: Pleuronectoidei
- Family: Poecilopsettidae
- Genus: Poecilopsetta; Günther, 1880

Type species
- Poecilopsetta colorata Günther, 1880

= Poecilopsetta =

Genus of fishes

Poecilopsetta is a genus of small righteye flounders mainly found in deep water in the Indo-Pacific. Two species, P. beanii and P. inermis, are from the West Atlantic.

== Species ==
The currently recognized species in this genus are:

- Poecilopsetta albomaculata Norman, 1939
- Poecilopsetta beanii (Goode, 1881) (deepwater dab)
- Poecilopsetta colorata Günther, 1880 (colored righteye flounder)
- Poecilopsetta dorsialta Guibord & Chapleau, 2001
- Poecilopsetta hawaiiensis C. H. Gilbert, 1905
- Poecilopsetta inermis (Breder, 1927)
- Poecilopsetta macrocephala Hoshino, Amaoka & Last, 2001
- Poecilopsetta multiradiata Kawai, Amaoka & Séret, 2010
- Poecilopsetta natalensis Norman, 1931 (African righteye flounder)
- Poecilopsetta normani Foroshchuk & Fedorov, 1992
- Poecilopsetta pectoralis Kawai & Amaoka, 2006
- Poecilopsetta plinthus (D. S. Jordan & Starks, 1904) (tile-colored righteye flounder)
- Poecilopsetta praelonga Alcock, 1894 (Alcock's narrow-body righteye flounder)
- Poecilopsetta vaynei Quéro, Hensley & Maugé, 1988
- Poecilopsetta zanzibarensis Norman, 1939
