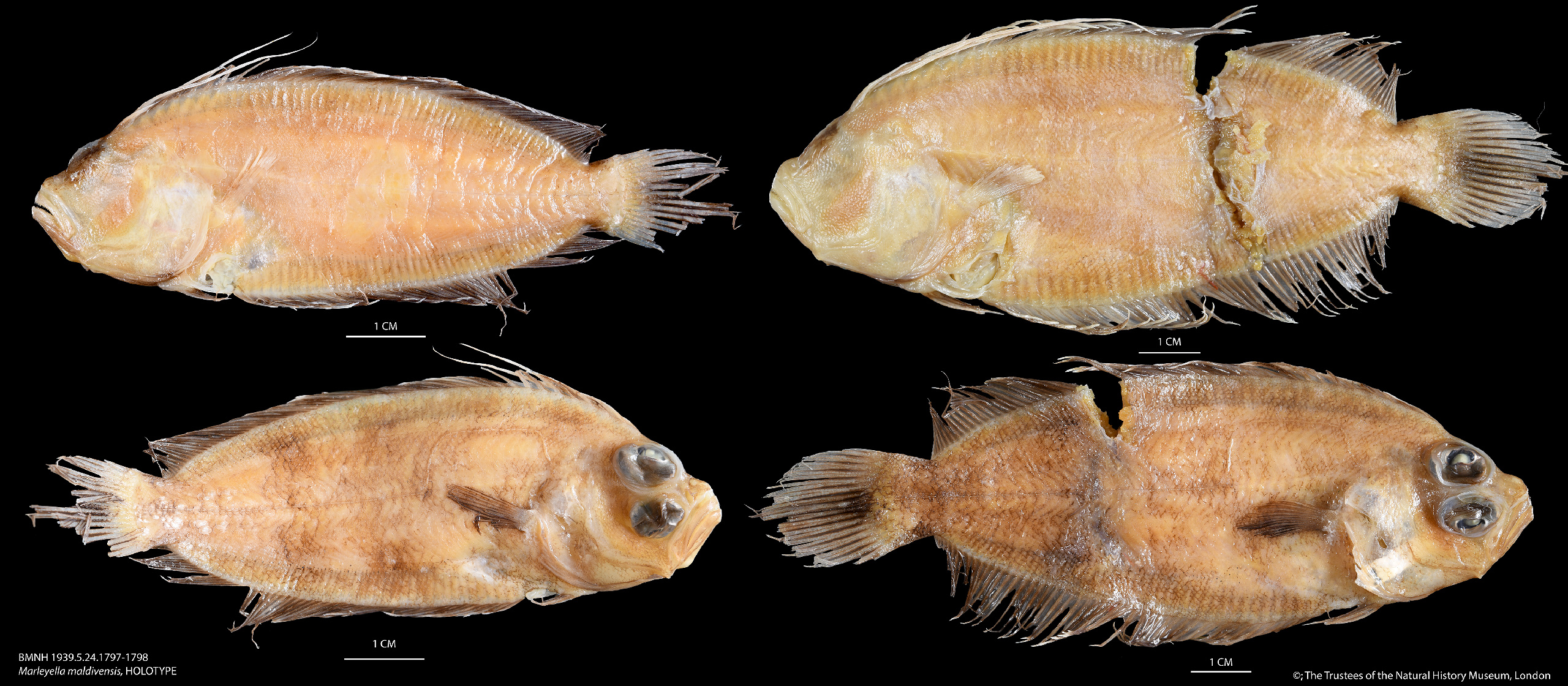

Scientific classification
- Kingdom: Animalia
- Phylum: Chordata
- Class: Actinopterygii
- Order: Carangiformes
- Suborder: Pleuronectoidei
- Family: Pleuronectidae
- Genus: Marleyella
- Species: M. maldivensis

Binomial name
- Marleyella maldivensis Norman, 1939
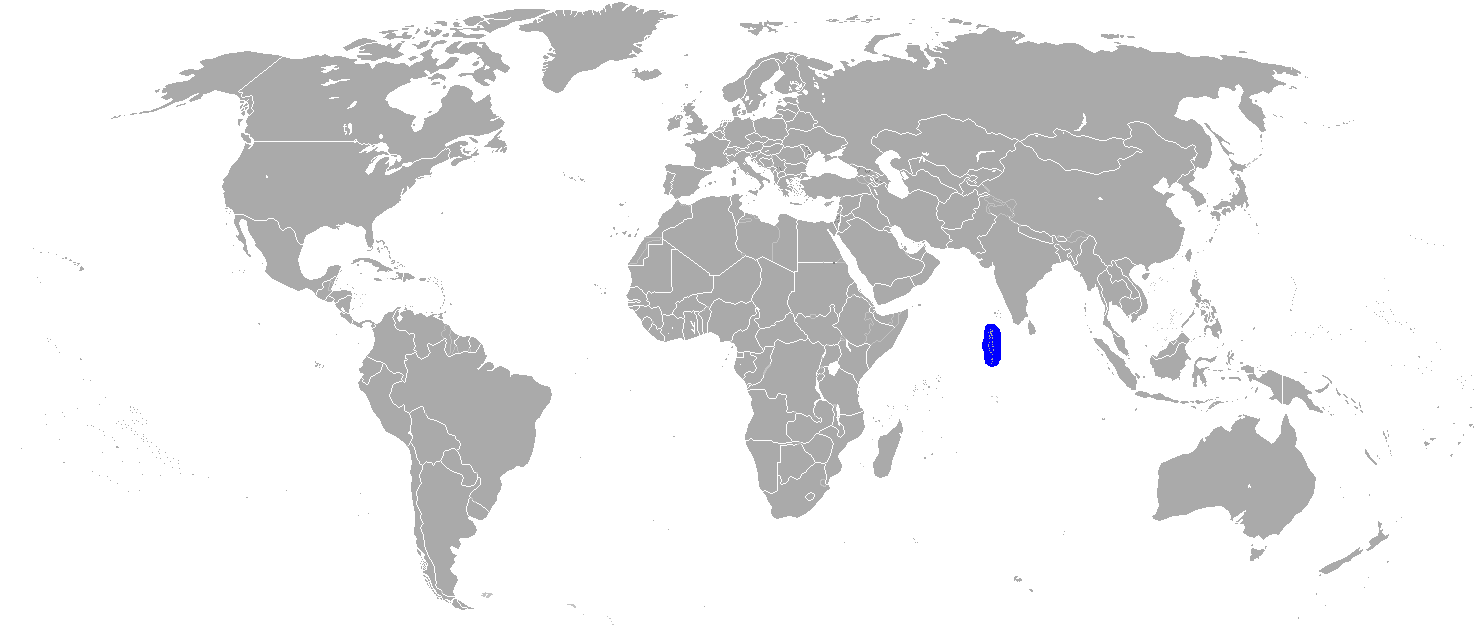
- Distribution of M. maldivensis

= Marleyella maldivensis =

Species of fish

Marleyella maldivensis is a flatfish of the family Pleuronectidae. It is a demersal fish that lives on saltwater bottoms at depths of up to 229 metres (751 ft) in the tropical waters around the Ari Atoll (Maldives) in the western Indian Ocean. It can grow up to 10.4 centimetres (4.1 in) in length.
