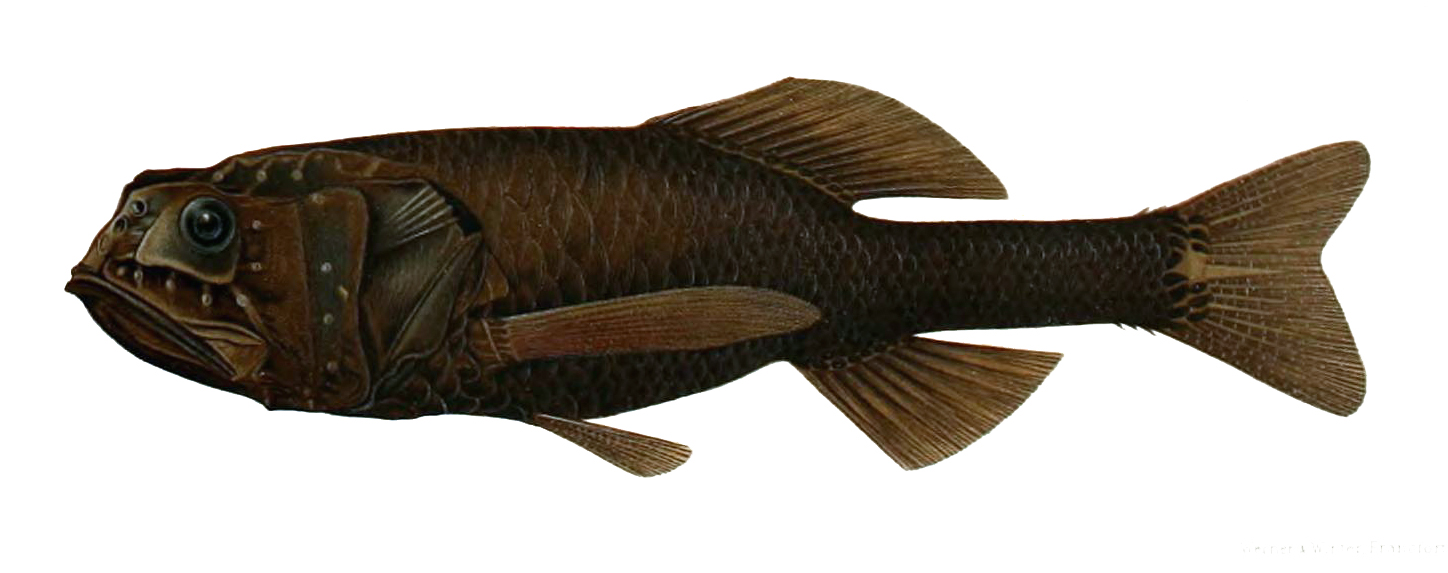
- Longjaw Bigscale (S. robustus)

Scientific classification
- Kingdom: Animalia
- Phylum: Chordata
- Class: Actinopterygii
- Order: Beryciformes
- Family: Melamphaidae
- Genus: Scopeloberyx; Zugmayer, 1911

= Scopeloberyx =

Genus of fishes

Scopeloberyx is a genus of ridgeheads.

== Species ==
There are currently nine recognized species in this genus:

- Scopeloberyx bannikovi Kotlyar, 2004
- Scopeloberyx malayanus (M. C. W. Weber, 1913)
- Scopeloberyx maxillaris (Garman, 1899)
- Scopeloberyx microlepis (Norman, 1937) (Southern bigscale)
- Scopeloberyx opisthopterus (A. E. Parr, 1933)
- Scopeloberyx pequenoi Kotlyar, 2004
- Scopeloberyx robustus (Günther, 1887) (Longjaw bigscale)
- Scopeloberyx rossicus Kotlyar, 2004
- Scopeloberyx rubriventer (Koefoed, 1953)
- Scopeloberyx shakhovskoyi
