= Large-scale righteye flounder =

Scientific classification
- Kingdom: Animalia
- Phylum: Chordata
- Class: Actinopterygii
- Order: Carangiformes
- Suborder: Pleuronectoidei
- Family: Pleuronectidae
- Genus: Nematops
- Species: N. grandisquama

Binomial name
- Nematops grandisquama Weber & de Beaufort, 1929

Species of fish

The large-scale righteye flounder (Nematops grandisquama) is a flatfish of the family Pleuronectidae. It is a demersal fish that lives on saltwater bottoms at depths of between 108 and 180 metres (354 and 591 ft). Its natural habitat is the tropical waters of the Indo-West Pacific, from Bali to Indonesia and the southwest coast of India. It can grow up to 9 centimetres (3.5 in) in length.

== Description ==
The large-scale right-eye flounder is, as its name suggests, a right-eyed flatfish. It has a slender body, 2.2 to 2.4 times long as it is wide, with a short pectoral fin. It has a tentacle on each eye.

== Diet ==
The diet of the large-scale right-eye flounder consists of small zoobenthos organisms.
