= Tarletonbeania taylori =

Conservation status
- Least Concern (IUCN 3.1)

Scientific classification
- Kingdom: Animalia
- Phylum: Chordata
- Class: Actinopterygii
- Order: Myctophiformes
- Family: Myctophidae
- Genus: Tarletonbeania
- Species: T. taylori

Binomial name
- Tarletonbeania taylori Mead, 1953

Species of fish

Tarletonbeania taylori, also known as the North Pacific lanternfish, is a species of lanternfish. It is found in the North Pacific. It grows to 7 cm (2.8 in) standard length.

== Etymology ==
The fish is named in honor of oceanographer Frederick Henry Carlyle Taylor (b. 1919), of the Pacific Biological Station in Namaimo, British Columbia, Canada.
