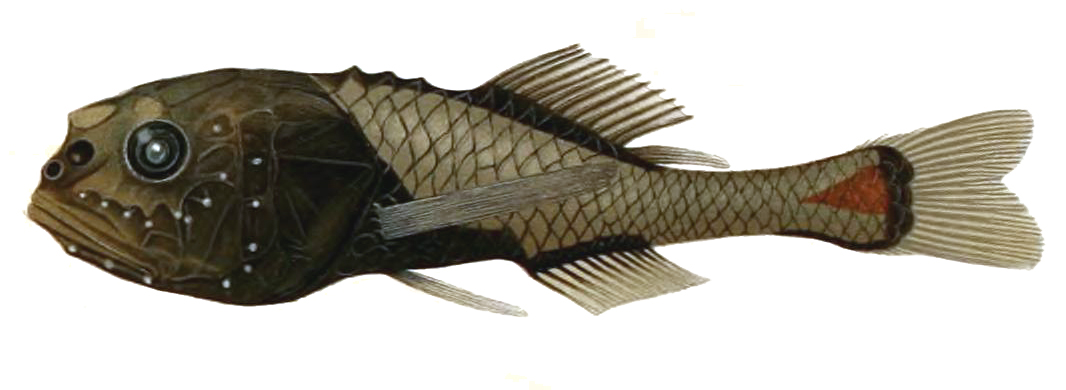

Conservation status
- Least Concern (IUCN 3.1)

Scientific classification
- Kingdom: Animalia
- Phylum: Chordata
- Class: Actinopterygii
- Order: Beryciformes
- Family: Melamphaidae
- Genus: Poromitra
- Species: P. crassiceps

Binomial name
- Poromitra crassiceps Günther, 1878

= Poromitra crassiceps =

Species of fish

Poromitra crassiceps, commonly called the crested bigscale (also called large-headed midnight fish, crested melamphid, or one-horned melamphaid) is a species of deep sea fish in the ridgehead family.

While the fish with the common name crested bigscale in Alaskan waters had formerly been identified as P. crassiceps, it is now believed that Alaskan crested bigscales are actually Poromitra curilensis, and that P. crassiceps is restricted to the Atlantic Ocean. As a result of this mis-identification, P. crassiceps is occasionally identified as the largest ridgehead - while specimens of P. curilensis as large as 18 cm SL have been found, the maximum length of P. crassiceps is 14.8 cm SL.

Although almost no light penetrates to the deep sea from the surface, the crested bigscale has evolved features that make it practically invisible. Like other deep sea fish, it needs to avoid being seen by predators, some of which hunt for prey by creating their own light by means of bioluminescence. The crested bigscale achieves invisibility by having a skin that absorbs light with great efficiency. The pigment melanin is crammed into granules which are grouped into melanophores which cover virtually the whole of the dermis. This absorbs almost all of the incoming light, and any remaining light that scatters sideways is absorbed by neighbouring granules. The melanophores also cover the big scales, but these detach easily, and any predator that gets close enough, may end up with a mouthful of scales. Altogether, the absorption of light is 99.5% efficient, a fact that makes photographing this fish in its natural habitat very difficult.
