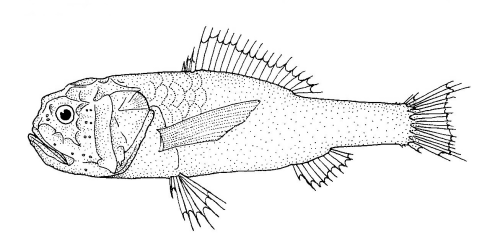
- Melamphaes microps
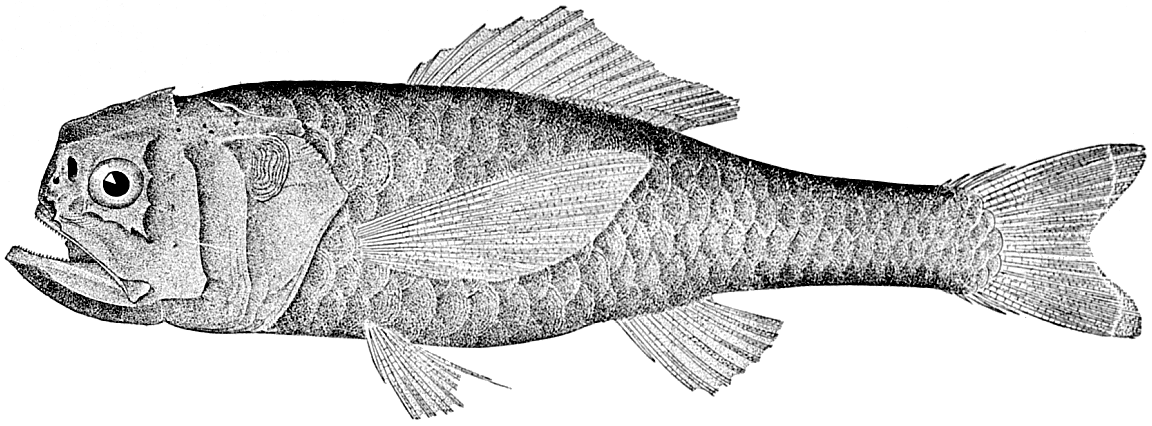
- Melamphaes suborbitalis

Scientific classification
- Kingdom: Animalia
- Phylum: Chordata
- Class: Actinopterygii
- Order: Beryciformes
- Family: Melamphaidae
- Genus: Melamphaes; Günther, 1864

= Melamphaes =

Genus of fishes

Melamphaes is a genus of fish in the family Melamphaidae found in Atlantic, Indian and Pacific Ocean.

== Species ==
There are currently 37 recognized species in this genus:

- Melamphaes acanthomus Ebeling, 1962 (Slender bigscale)
- Melamphaes contradictorius Kotlyar, 2015
- Melamphaes danae Ebeling, 1962 (Big-scale fish)
- Melamphaes ebelingi Keene, 1973
- Melamphaes eulepis Ebeling, 1962
- Melamphaes eurous Kotlyar, 2016
- Melamphaes falsidicus Kotlyar, 2011
- Melamphaes hubbsi Ebeling, 1962
- Melamphaes inconspicuus Kotlyar, 2015
- Melamphaes indicus Ebeling, 1962
- Melamphaes janae Ebeling, 1962
- Melamphaes kobylyanskyi Kotlyar, 2015
- Melamphaes laeviceps Ebeling, 1962
- Melamphaes lentiginosus Kotlyar, 2015
- Melamphaes leprus Ebeling, 1962
- Melamphaes longivelis A. E. Parr, 1933 (Eye-brow bigscale)
- Melamphaes lugubris C. H. Gilbert, 1890 (High-snout bigscale)
- Melamphaes macrocephalus A. E. Parr, 1931
- Melamphaes manifestus Kotlyar, 2011
- Melamphaes microps (Günther, 1878)
- Melamphaes nikolayi Kotlyar, 2012
- Melamphaes occlusus Kotlyar, 2012
- Melamphaes pachystomus Kotlyar, 2011
- Melamphaes papavereus Kotlyar, 2016
- Melamphaes parini Kotlyar, 1999
- Melamphaes parvus Ebeling, 1962 (Little bigscale)
- Melamphaes polylepis Ebeling, 1962
- Melamphaes proximus Kotlyar, 2015
- Melamphaes pumilus Ebeling, 1962
- Melamphaes shcherbachevi Kotlyar, 2015
- Melamphaes simus Ebeling, 1962 (Ridge-head bigscale)
- Melamphaes spinifer Ebeling, 1962
- Melamphaes suborbitalis (T. N. Gill, 1883) (Shoulder-spine bigscale)
- Melamphaes succedaneus Kotlyar, 2015
- Melamphaes typhlops (R. T. Lowe, 1843)
- Melamphaes uniformis Kotlyar, 2013
- Melamphaes xestoachidus Kotlyar, 2011
