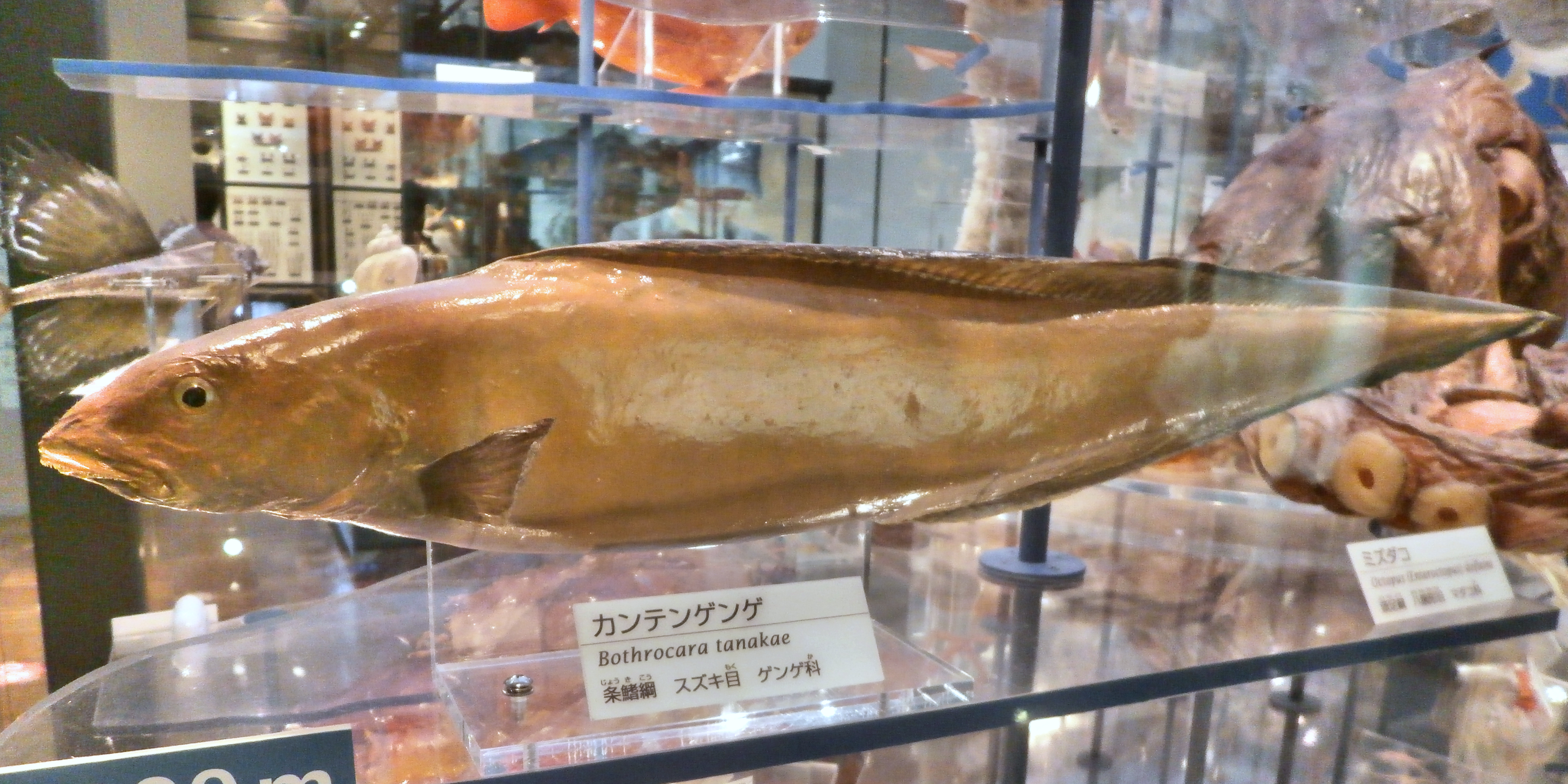
- Zestichthys tanakae specimen

Scientific classification
- Domain: Eukaryota
- Kingdom: Animalia
- Phylum: Chordata
- Class: Actinopterygii
- Order: Perciformes
- Family: Zoarcidae
- Genus: Bothrocara
- Species: B. tanakae

Binomial name
- Bothrocara tanakae (Jordan & Hubbs, 1925)

Synonyms
- Bothrocara tanakai (Jordan & Hubbs, 1925); Zestichthys tanakae Jordan & Hubbs, 1925; Zestichthys tanakai Jordan & Hubbs, 1925

= Bothrocara tanakae =

Species of fish

Bothrocara tanakae, is a species of fish in the family Zoarcidae. Fully-grown males can reach a total length of 64.5 centimetres (25.4 in).
