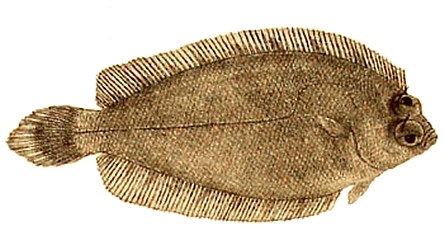
- Nematops microstoma

Scientific classification
- Kingdom: Animalia
- Phylum: Chordata
- Class: Actinopterygii
- Order: Carangiformes
- Suborder: Pleuronectoidei
- Family: Pleuronectidae
- Subfamily: Poecilopsettinae
- Genus: Nematops; Günther, 1880

Type species
- Nematops microstoma Günther 1880

= Nematops =

Genus of fishes

Nematops is a genus of righteye flounders native to the Indo-West Pacific. Due to their small size (up to 10 centimetres or 3.9 inches) and depth of habitation (up to 650 metres or 2,130 feet) few examples of this genus are caught, and as a result little is known of their morphology and distribution.

== Species ==
There are currently four recognized species in this genus:

- Nematops grandisquama Weber & de Beaufort, 1929 (Large-scale righteye flounder)
- Nematops macrochirus Norman, 1931 (Narrow-body righteye flounder)
- Nematops microstoma Günther, 1880 (Small-mouth righteye flounder)
- Nematops nanosquama Amaoka, Kawai & Séret, 2006
