= Narrow-body righteye flounder =

Scientific classification
- Kingdom: Animalia
- Phylum: Chordata
- Class: Actinopterygii
- Order: Carangiformes
- Suborder: Pleuronectoidei
- Family: Pleuronectidae
- Genus: Nematops
- Species: N. macrochirus

Binomial name
- Nematops macrochirus Norman, 1931

Species of fish

The narrow-body righteye flounder (Nematops macrochirus) is a flatfish of the family Pleuronectidae. It is a demersal fish that lives on saltwater bottoms at depths of between 218 and 438 metres (715 and 1,437 ft). Its natural habitat is the waters of the Indo-West Pacific, from the Bali Strait to Northern Territory, Queensland and New South Wales in Australia. It can grow up to 15 centimetres (5.9 in) in length.

== Etymology & taxonomy ==
The species name "macrochirus" is derived from the Greek: "macro" meaning "long", and "chirus" from "kheiros", meaning "hand".

Although Fowler described the long-fin righteye flounder, Nematops chui, in 1934, it has been shown that the morphology of N. chui overlaps completely with that of N. macrochirus, and that the long-fin righteye flounder is in fact a junior description of N. macrochirus as described by Norman in 1931.

== Description ==
The narrow-fin right-eye flounder is, as its name suggests, a right-eyed flatfish. It has a slender body, almost three times long as it is wide, with large eyes and a small symmetrical mouth. The eyes have dark tentacles. The lateral line curves strongly above the pectoral fin, and the caudal fin is pointed. The upper (eyed) side is brown, with indistinct blotches on the fins and darker blotches on the caudal and pectoral fins. The underside is yellowish-white.
