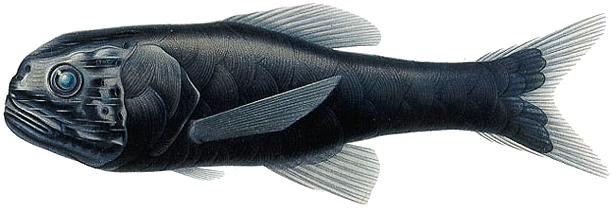
- Ragged Bigscale (S. mizolepis mizolepis)

Scientific classification
- Kingdom: Animalia
- Phylum: Chordata
- Class: Actinopterygii
- Order: Beryciformes
- Family: Melamphaidae
- Genus: Scopelogadus; Vaillant, 1888

= Scopelogadus =

Genus of fishes

Scopelogadus is a genus of ridgeheads. The generic name derives from the Greek σκόπελος (skopelos, "lanternfish") and γάδος (gados, "(cod) fish").

== Species ==
There are currently three recognized species in this genus:

- Scopelogadus beanii (Günther, 1887) (Bean's bigscale)
- Scopelogadus mizolepis (Günther, 1878)
  - Scopelogadus mizolepis bispinosus (C. H. Gilbert, 1915) (Twospine bigscale)
  - Scopelogadus mizolepis mizolepis (Günther, 1878) (Ragged bigscale)
- Scopelogadus perplexus Kotyar, 2021
- Scopelogadus unispinis Ebeling & W. H. Weed, 1963
