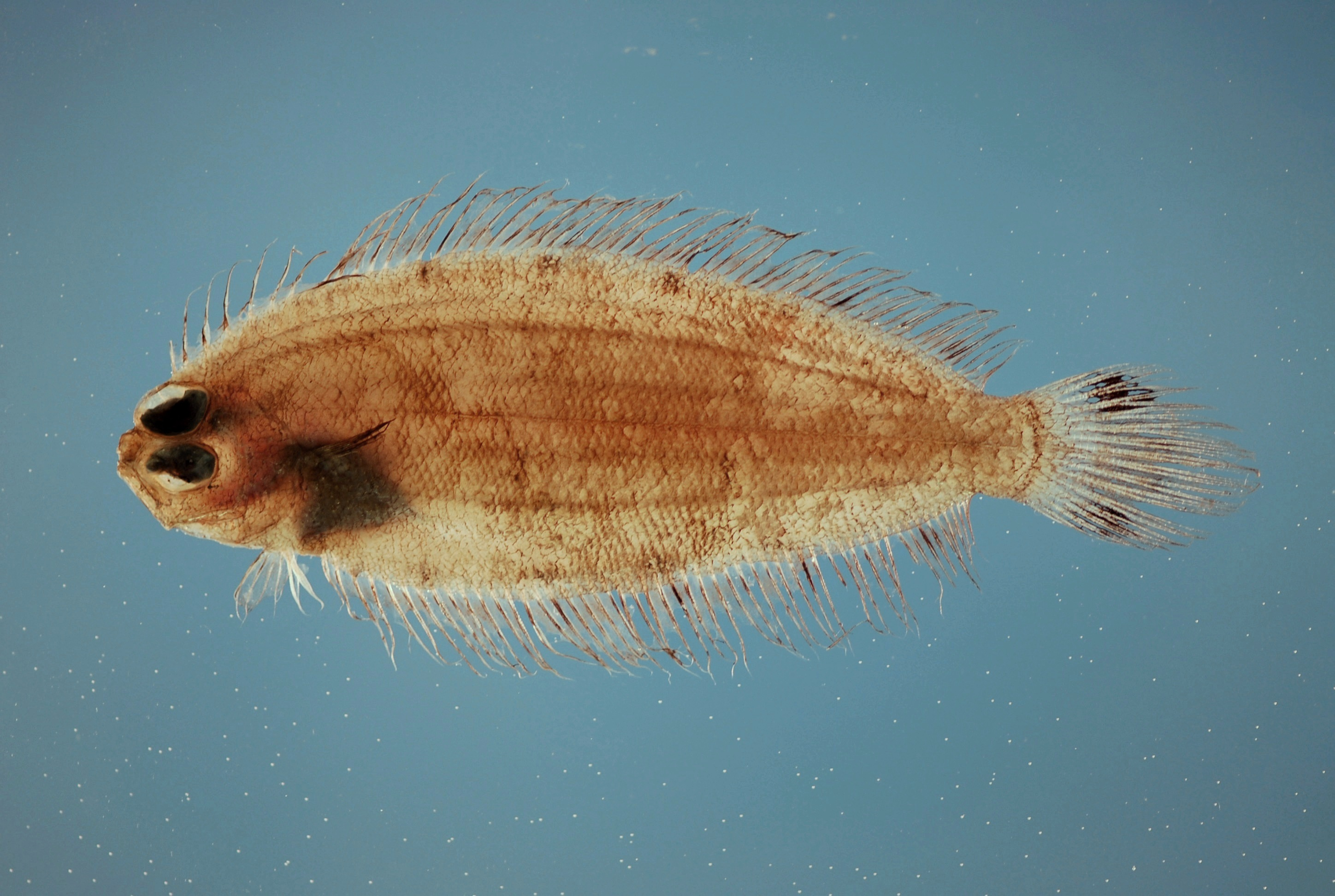

Scientific classification
- Kingdom: Animalia
- Phylum: Chordata
- Class: Actinopterygii
- Order: Carangiformes
- Suborder: Pleuronectoidei
- Family: Poecilopsettidae
- Genus: Poecilopsetta
- Species: P. beanii

Binomial name
- Poecilopsetta beanii (Goode, 1881)

Synonyms
- Limanda beanii Goode, 1881

= Deepwater dab =

Species of fish

The deepwater dab (Poecilopsetta beanii) is a species of flatfish in the family Poecilopsettidae. It is a bathydemersal fish that lives on bottoms at depths of 155 to 1,636 m (509 to 5,367 ft). It can reach 10.7 cm (4.2 in) in length. Its native habitat is the western Atlantic and Caribbean, from New England, USA, south through the Gulf of Mexico to Campeche, Mexico, and from the coast of Brazil to northern Colombia, the Leeward Islands, Windward Islands, and Cuba.
