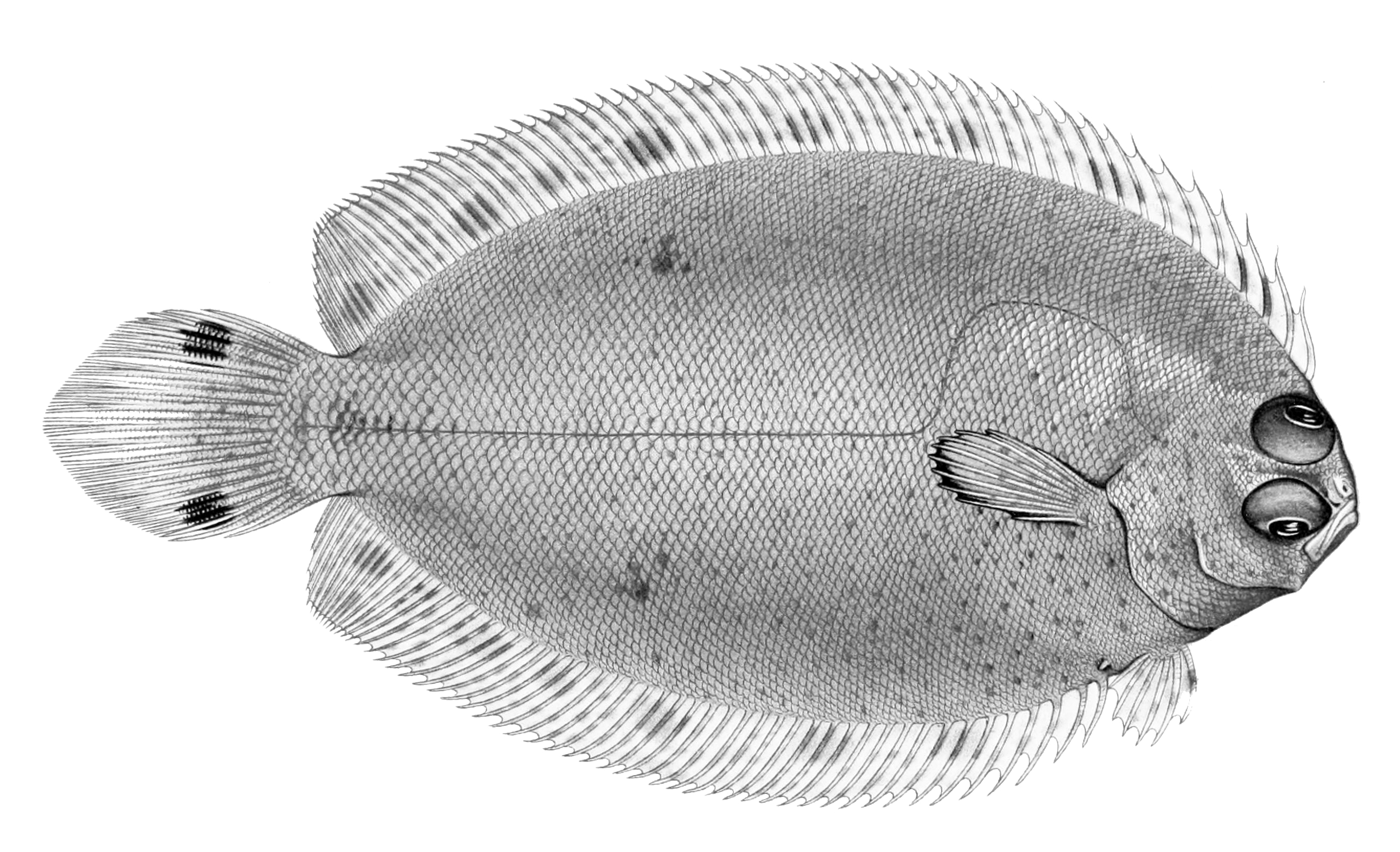
- Poecilopsetta hawaiiensis

Scientific classification
- Kingdom: Animalia
- Phylum: Chordata
- Class: Actinopterygii
- Order: Carangiformes
- Suborder: Pleuronectoidei
- Family: Poecilopsettidae; Norman, 1934

Type genus
- Poecilopsetta Günther, 1880

= Poecilopsettidae =

Family of flatfishes

The Poecilopsettidae are a family of flatfish, comprising three genera and 21 species. Species are typically demersal, living on marine bottoms at depths between 60 and 500 m (200 and 1,640 ft) in the Indo-Pacific and northwestern Atlantic; the deepest recorded occurrence is 1,636 m (5,367 ft) in the deepwater dab, Poecilopsetta beanii. Sizes range from 9 to 19 cm (3.5 to 7.5 in) in length, though most species are usually under 15 cm (5.9 in) long. Diets consist of zoobenthos.

In some traditional classifications, the group was recognisied as subfamily Poecilopsettinae in the family Pleuronectidae.

== Genera ==
- Marleyella
- Nematops
- Poecilopsetta
