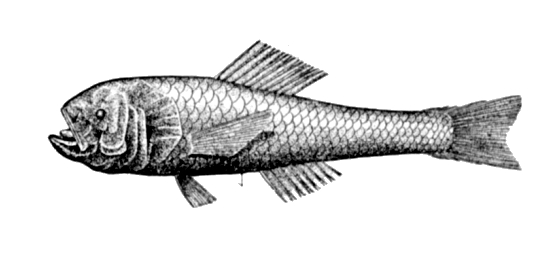
- Scopelogadus mizolepis mizolepis

Scientific classification
- Kingdom: Animalia
- Phylum: Chordata
- Class: Actinopterygii
- Order: Beryciformes
- Suborder: Berycoidei
- Family: Melamphaidae; T. N. Gill, 1893

Genera
- Melamphaes; Poromitra; Scopeloberyx; Scopelogadus; Sio

= Ridgehead =

Family of fishes

Ridgeheads, also known as bigscales, are a family (Melamphaidae, from the Greek melanos [black] and amphi [by both sides]) of small, deep-sea beryciform fish. The family contains approximately 37 species in five genera; their distribution is worldwide, but ridgeheads are absent from the Arctic Ocean and Mediterranean Sea. Although the family is one of the most widespread and plentiful of deep-sea families, none of its members are of interest to commercial fishery.

These fish are named for their large scales and pronounced cranial ridges, as well as for their typically dark brown to black coloration. Ridgeheads are the largest and most diverse family of their order.

== Description ==
The melamphid body is robust, oblong, subcylindrical, and slightly compressed laterally. The head is large and scaleless, with its profile either bluntly rounded or with a sharp frontal angle; it is conspicuous for its prominent ridges, which are covered by thin skin. The head is also cavernous, being riddled by muciferous canals—similar structures are found in the beryciform slimehead (Trachichthyidae) and fangtooth (Anoplogastridae) families. Sharp spines and serrations may further adorn the head in some species. The mouth is large and oblique; the long jaws extend to or exceed the posterior margin of the eye, and are lined with villiform (brushlike) teeth. The vomer, palatines, endopterygiod, and ectopterygiods all lack teeth. The eyes are usually fairly small, but in Poromitra megalops they may exceed 20 per cent of the head's length in diameter.

The large scales are cycloid and imbricate; they are arranged in a longitudinal series of 12–40. Usually deciduous, these scales are largest in Scopelogadus species; in these and some other species, the scales' circuli (concentric lines) are clearly visible to the unaided eye. The lateral line (excluding the network of cranial canals) is largely absent; when present, it is reduced to 1–2 pored scales following the operculum's upper edge. The caudal peduncle is relatively long; the caudal fin is forked to emarginate and possesses 3–4 procurrent spines. The single dorsal fin originates behind the pectoral and pelvic fins and contains 1–3 weak spines and 9–18 soft rays; the pectoral fins are elongate and tapered (the superior rays being longer than the inferior rays) and contain 12–16 soft rays. The pelvic fins are thoracic to subthoracic with one spine and 6–8 soft rays; the anal fin is small and set far back, with one spine and 7–11 soft rays.

The branchiostegal rays number 7–8 and the vertebrae 24–31. The largest species recorded is Poromitra curilensis, a Pacific ridgehead related to the crested bigscale, at up to 18 centimetres standard length (SL; a measurement excluding the caudal fin). Most ridgeheads are well under 10 centimetres SL.

== Life history ==
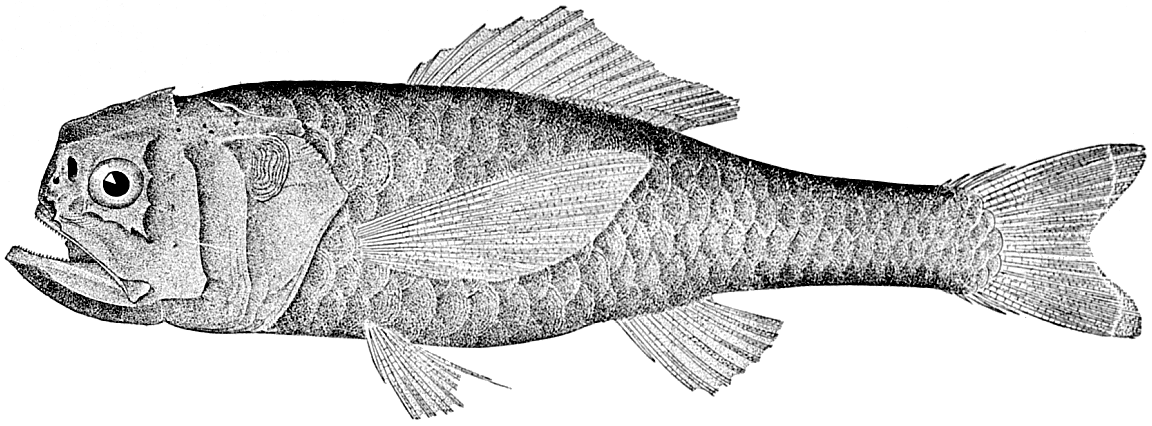
In addition to cranial ridges, the head of Melamphaes suborbitalis also features strong post-temporal spines directed antero-dorsally. The fine teeth lining the fish's jaws, its procurrent caudal spines, and scale circuli are also visible.

Ridgeheads are meso- to bathypelagic; they have been trawled at depths as shallow as 150 metres (490 ft) to as deep as 3,400 metres (11,200 ft). Some species undergo diel vertical migrations of several hundred metres; that is, they remain at aphotic depths (below ca. 400 metres) during the day but rise to surface waters (10–100 metres) at night to feed and (presumably) to avoid predators. Ridgeheads feed primarily on zooplankton, such as copepods, euphausiids, and other small pelagic crustaceans. There is also a marked segregation of life stages: larval and juvenile ridgeheads are present within the upper 200 metres of the water column, whereas adults are typically found much farther down.

The family is sometimes termed pseudoceanic because, rather than having an even distribution in open water, ridgeheads occur in significantly higher abundances around structural oases, notably seamounts and over continental slopes. This is also true of other deep-sea pelagic groups, such as the lanternfish (Myctophidae), marine hatchetfish (Sternoptychidae), and lightfish (Phosichthyidae or Photichthyidae) families. The phenomenon is explained by the likewise abundance of prey species which are also attracted to the structures.

As oviparous pelagic spawners, ridgeheads produce many tiny eggs which are fertilized externally; the eggs and larvae (and early juveniles) are buoyant and planktonic, drifting with the currents near the surface until the juveniles have reached the point where they are strong enough to determine their own direction. Study of the spawning habits of twospine bigscales (Scopelogadus mizolepis bispinosus) indicates spawning occurs year-round, with no definite peaks.

Although their deep-living nature protects them from predation to some degree, ridgeheads are prey to large seabirds such as albatrosses; large squid such as the Jumbo Squid (Dosidicus gigas) and Sevenstar Flying Squid (Martialia hyadesii); oceanic dolphins (family Delphinidae); and large pelagic fish, such as tuna and other scombrids.
