= Tarleton Hoffman Bean =

American ichthyologist (1846–1916)

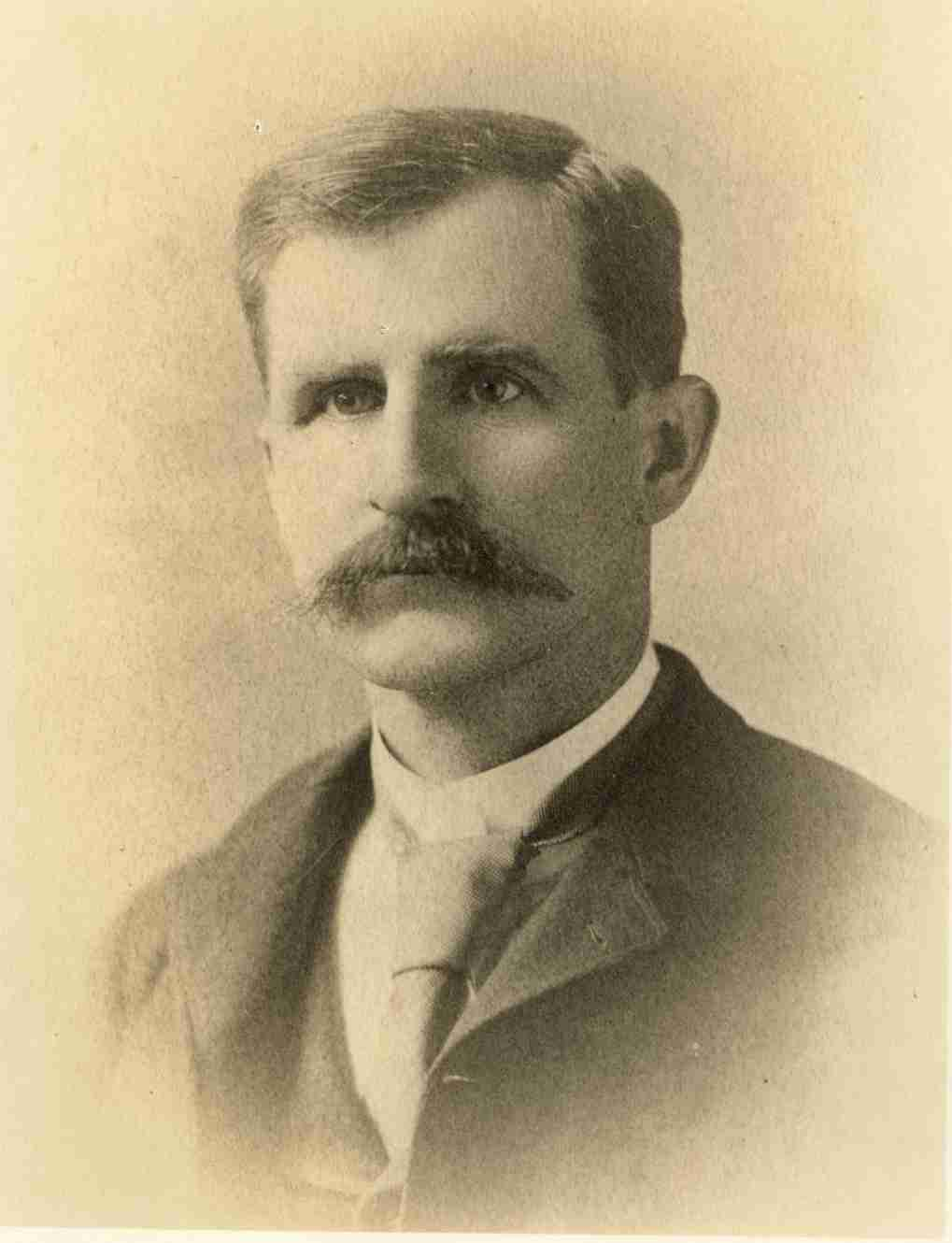
- Born: October 8, 1846; Bainbridge, Pennsylvania
- Died: December 28, 1916 (aged 70); Albany, New York
- Education: George Washington University
- Known for: Systematic Ichthyology
- Scientific career
- Fields: Ichthyology
- Workplaces: Smithsonian Institution, U.S. Fish Commission, New York Aquarium, American Museum of Natural History
- Author abbrev. (zoology): Bean

Tarleton Hoffman Bean (October 8, 1846 – December 28, 1916) was an American ichthyologist.

== Biography and education ==
Tarleton Hoffman Bean was born to George Bean and Mary Smith Bean in Bainbridge, Pennsylvania, on October 8, 1846. He attended State Normal School at nearby Millersport, Pennsylvania, graduating in 1866. He received an M.D. degree from Columbian University, now George Washington University, Washington, DC, 1876.

In 1883, he was awarded an M.S. degree from the Indiana University on the basis of his professional accomplishments, although he did not attend classes there. He married Laurette H. van Hook, daughter of John Welsh VanHook, a local Washington businessman, in 1878 in Washington, DC. They had one daughter, Caroline van Hook Bean (born in Washington on November 16, 1879), a noted artist who later married Bernardus Blommers, Jr.

His brother, Barton Appler Bean, also became an ichthyologist and worked under him at the National Museum.

Bean died in Albany, New York, on December 28, 1916.

== Career and contributions ==
In addition to his work in ichthyology, Bean was a forester, a fish culturist, a conservationist, an editor, an administrator, and an exhibitor. Growing up along the Susquehanna River in southern Pennsylvania, he presumably had an early introduction to fishes. His initial interest, however, was botany, perhaps stimulated by his acquaintance with Joseph Trimble Rothrock, a physician-scientist who had a medical practice in Wilkes-Barre, but also had taught botany at Pennsylvania State College.

His focus on ichthyology probably began in the summer of 1874, when he worked as a volunteer at the Fish Commission laboratory in Noank, Connecticut. There, he first met Spencer F. Baird and a number of the young scientists who had gathered around him. First among these was George Brown Goode, who with Bean would form one of the most famous collaborative teams in ichthyology. Bean spent the next two decades in Washington working for Baird's two institutions, the National Museum and the Fish Commission, in a number of capacities. He left Washington in 1895 to become the Director of the New York Aquarium, but political problems led to his resignation in 1898. He spent most of the next eight years working on the fisheries and forestry exhibits at the world's fairs in Paris (1900) and St. Louis (1904). In 1906, he became New York's state fish culturist, a position he held until his death in 1916 following an automobile accident.

Bean is probably best known for the work in systematic ichthyology that he did while in Washington, particularly in collaboration with Goode. The pair wrote 39 papers together, culminating in Oceanic Ichthyology (1896). They were the beneficiaries of the extensive survey and collecting activities being done by Fish Commission vessels in the poorly explored deep waters off the coast of North America. Bean was also an authority on the fishes of Pennsylvania, New York, Bermuda, and Alaska. Most of his later papers dealt with fish culture, and at the time of his death he was considered the nation's premier authority on that subject. He was also a dedicated educator, from his early teaching days in Pennsylvania to his work on the great international exhibitions and his articles and lectures on fishes, forestry, and conservation. Bean was a pioneer in the growth of American ichthyology in the post-Civil War years and by the end of his life was one of its most respected and honored members.

== Professional positions ==
- Principal, Smyrna Seminary in Delaware, 1869–1870
- Principal, Wilkes-Barre High School in Pennsylvania, 1870–1874
- Assistant in Ichthyology, Smithsonian Institution, 1878
- Curator of Fishes, U.S. National Museum, 1879–1888
- Ichthyologist, U.S. Fish Commission, 1888–1892
- Honorary Curator of Fishes, U.S. National Museum, 1889–1905
- Assistant in Charge of Fish Culture, U.S. Fish Commission, 1892-1895
- Director, New York Aquarium in Battery Park, 1895–1898
- Acting Curator of Fishes, American Museum of Natural History, 1897
- Director of Fishery and Forestry exhibits, Universal Exposition, Paris, France, 1900
- Chief, Departments of Fish and Game and Forestry, Louisiana Purchase Exposition, St. Louis, Missouri, 1904
- Fish Culturist, New York State, 1906–1916.

== Eponymy ==
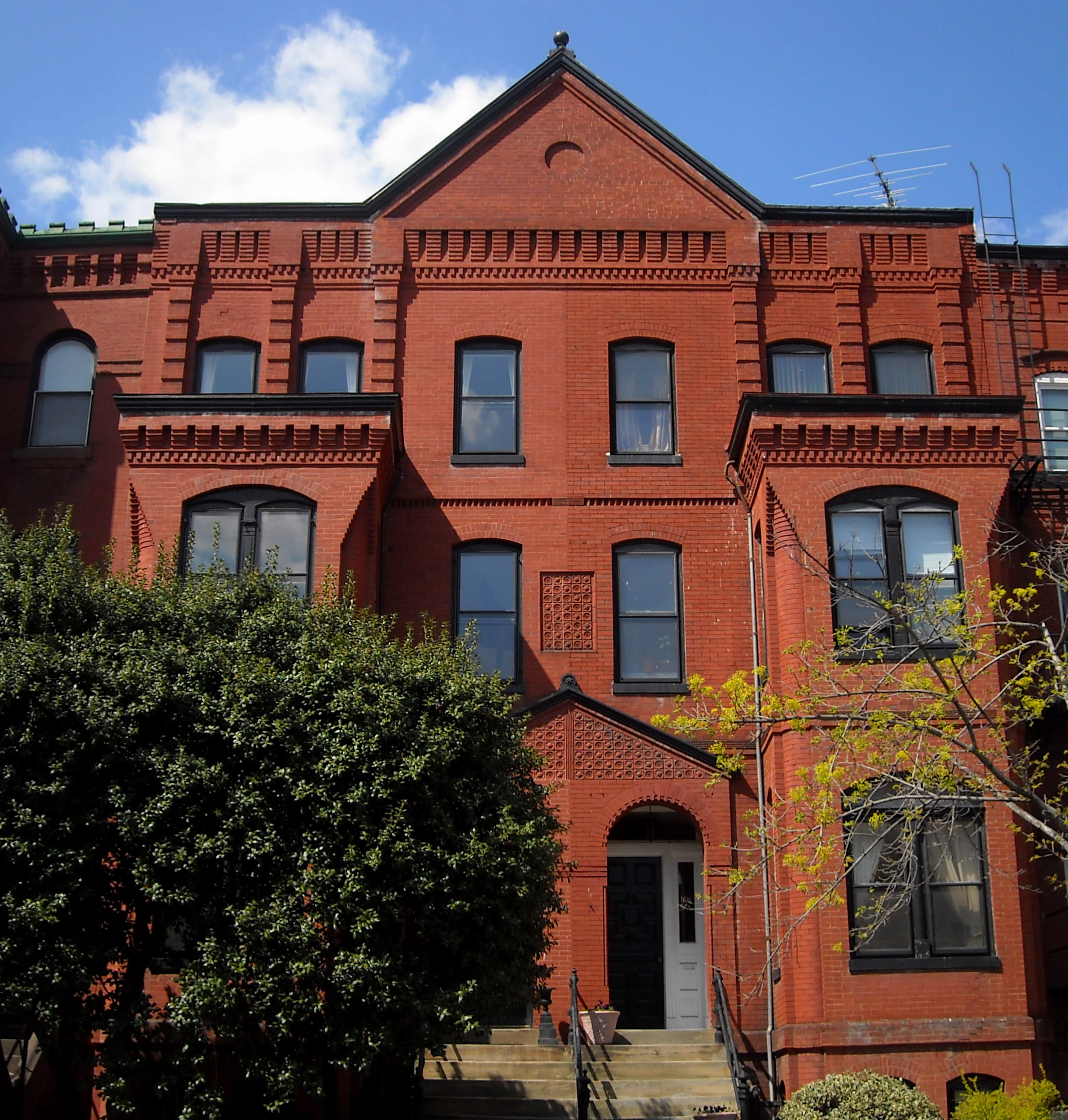
Tarleton Hoffman Bean's former residence in Washington, D.C.

The genus Tarletonbeania of lanternfishes was named after him by Rosa Smith Eigenmann and Carl H. Eigenmann in 1890.

Species named after him include:

- Naked sand darter, Ammocrypta beanii (Jordan, 1877).
- Atherinella beani (Meek & Hildebrand 1923).
- The Green Guapote, Mayaheros beani (Jordan, 1889).
- Ctenolucius beani (Fowler, 1907).
- Ophidion beani (Jordan & Gilbert, 1883).
- Deepwater dab, Poecilopsetta beanii (Goode, 1881).
- Bean's searobin, Prionotus beanii (Goode, 1896).
- Bean's bigscale, Scopelogadus beanii (Günther, 1887) (synonym: Plectromus beanii).
- Bean's sawtoothed eel, Serrivomer beanii (Gill & Ryder, 1883).

== See also ==
- Category:Taxa named by Tarleton Hoffman Bean

== Sources ==
Online Sources

- "Tarleton Hoffman Bean (1846–1916)". National Museum of Natural History.
- "Oceanic Ichthyology, A Treatise on the Deep-Sea and Pelagic Fishes of the World (1896)". National Oceanic and Atmospheric Administration.

Printed Sources

- Kelly, Howard A.; Burrage, Walter L. (eds.). "Bean, Tarleton Hoffman" . American Medical Biographies . Baltimore: The Norman, Remington Company.
- Blackford, C.M. 1917. Dr. Tarleton Hoffman Bean. Transactions of American Fisheries Society, 46 (3): 189–193.
- Kelly and Burrage. 1928. Dictionary of American Medical Biography: 79–80.
- National Cyclopedia of American Biography. 1935. 24: 88–89.
- Smith-Vaniz, W. F., B. B. Collette and B.E. Luckhurst. 1999. Fishes of Bermuda: History, Zoogeography, Annotated Checklist and Identification Keys, pp. 25–26. American Society of Ichthyologists and Herpetologists, Special Publication No. 4. Lawrence, Kansas: Allen Press.
