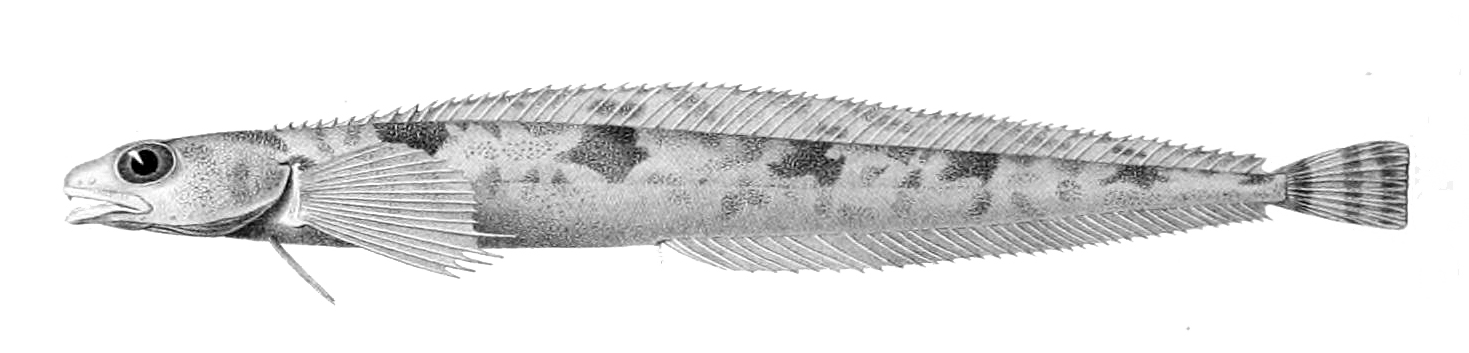

Scientific classification
- Kingdom: Animalia
- Phylum: Chordata
- Class: Actinopterygii
- Order: Perciformes
- Suborder: Zoarcoidei
- Family: Lumpenidae
- Genus: Leptoclinus; Gill, 1861
- Species: L. maculatus

Binomial name
- Leptoclinus maculatus (Fries, 1838)

Synonyms
- Clinus maculatus Fries, 1838; Ctenodon maculatus (Fries, 1838); Lumpenus maculatus (Fries, 1838); Stichaeus maculatus (Fries, 1838); Lumpenus aculeatus (Reinhardt, 1837); Clinus aculeatus Reinhardt, 1837; Plectobranchus diaphanocarus Schmidt, 1904

= Daubed shanny =

Species of fish

The daubed shanny (Leptoclinus maculatus), also known as the spotted snakeblenny, is a species of marine ray-finned fish belonging to the family Lumpenidae, the eel pricklebacks.

It is native to the coasts of Northern Atlantic Ocean and Northern Pacific Ocean.
