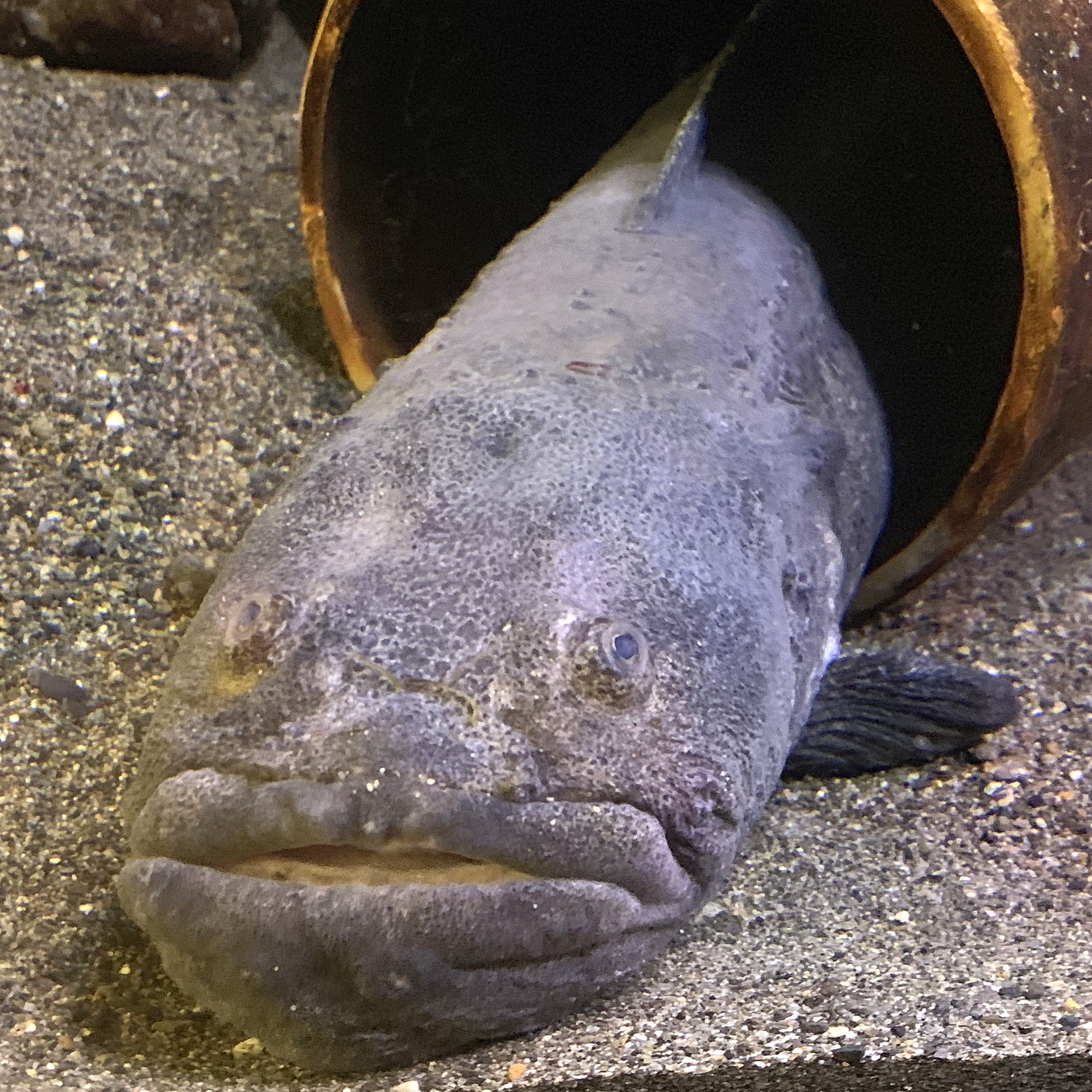

Scientific classification
- Kingdom: Animalia
- Phylum: Chordata
- Class: Actinopterygii
- Order: Perciformes
- Family: Cryptacanthodidae
- Genus: Cryptacanthodes
- Species: C. giganteus

Binomial name
- Cryptacanthodes giganteus (Kittlitz, 1858)

Synonyms
- Ophidium giganteum Kittlitz, 1858; Delolepis gigantea (Kittlitz, 1858); Delolepis giganteus (Kittlitz, 1858); Delolepis virgatus T. H. Bean, 1882

= Giant wrymouth =

Species of fish

== Description ==
Cryptacanthodes giganteus, or the Giant Wrymouth, is one of four species from the family Cryptacanthodidae. This bottom dwelling, burrowing fish is long and anguilliform which makes it commonly get mistaken for an eel. The family is characterized by their “small, dorsally positioned eyes, a compressed head, and strongly upturned mouths with a heavy jaw” and long eel-like body. The Giant Wrymouth, as the name specifies, is the largest of these four species and is about 123–127 cm in length at maturity. Little is known about the Cryptacanthodes, especially the Giant Wrymouth, as they live a demersal lifestyle in borrows. However, by looking at the family, Cryptacanthodidae is considered a very distinct monophyletic group due to three features that distinguish it from other members of the suborder. The features include, "1) extension of the braincase into the anterior myodome; 2) greatly enlarged bone foramina passing the cephalic lateralis canals; and 3) greatly elongated pectoral fin actinosts (radials)’ (Anderson, 1984:14)".

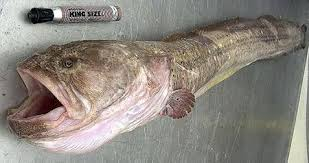
Giant Wrymouth (WDFW)

The Giant Wrymouth coexists with another Cryptacanthode, the Dwarf Wrymouth, in the North Pacific. At maturity the Giant Wrymouth is easily distinguished from C. aleutensis as it is the Dwarf Wrymouth and reaches a length of about 30 cm. While they are easily distinguished in adulthood, the larval stage is difficult to distinguish as they both have “neustonic larvae with elongate bodies and heavy pigmentation". Neustonic refers to the surface of the water, specifically the first 10–20 cm. Findings in a study by Lisa G De Forest distinguish the two larvae to get a better understanding of these complicated fish. De Forest found that the Giant Wrymouth have slender larvae with a higher total vertebral and dorsal-fin spine counts and less overall pigmentation than C. aleutensis. More specifically, throughout the larval life stage the body depth at the pectoral fin base decreases while body depth at the anus increases. Preanal length and eye diameter decrease with development while head length and snout length increase. The yolk-sac also remains present until about 17.5mm. All vertebrates are ossified(turned into bones) by 26.0mm. Overall, Cryptacanthodes giganteus can be distinguished from other neustonic larvae by their high vertebrate count, long dorsal fin composed solely of spines, and an absence of pelvic fins.

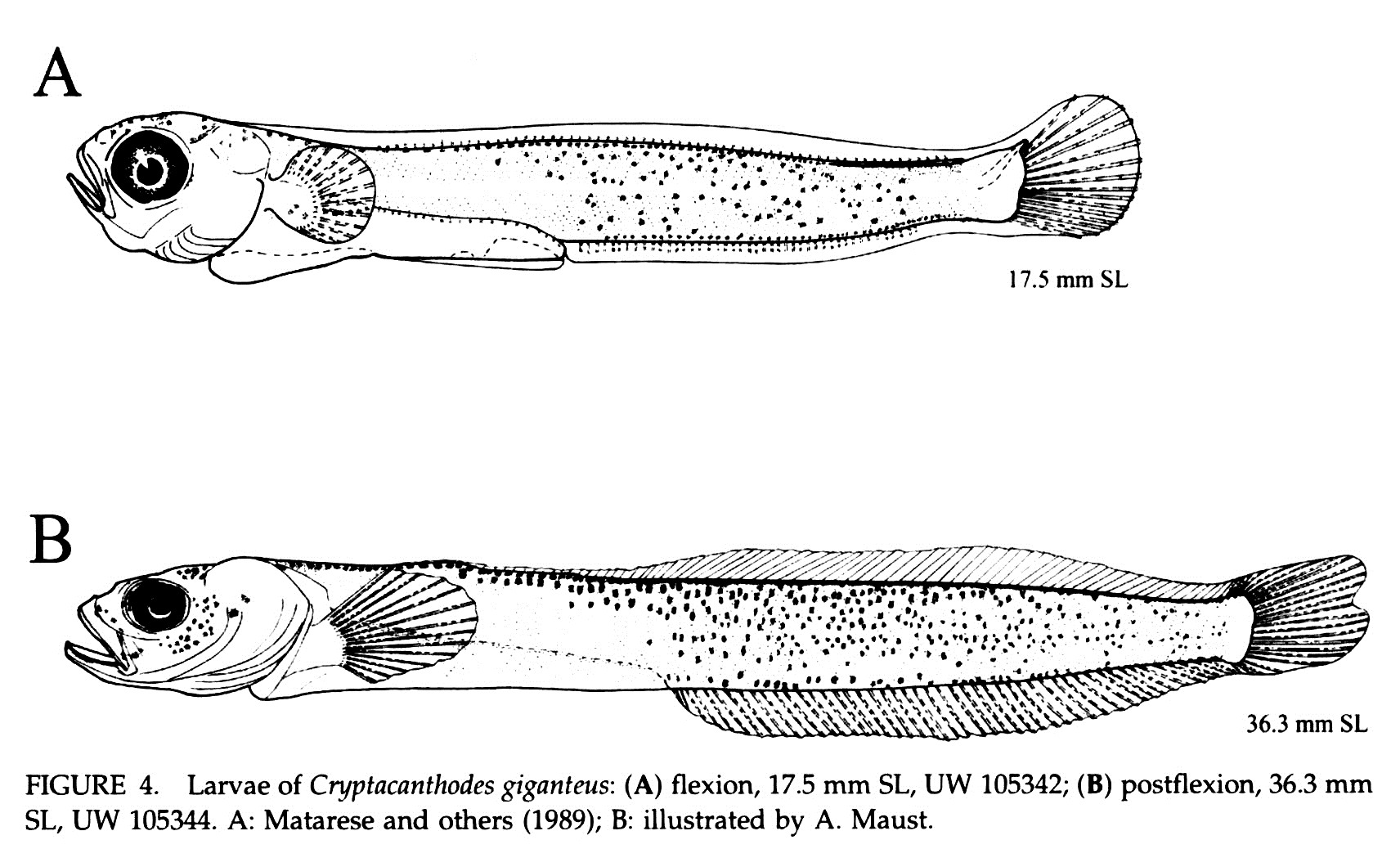

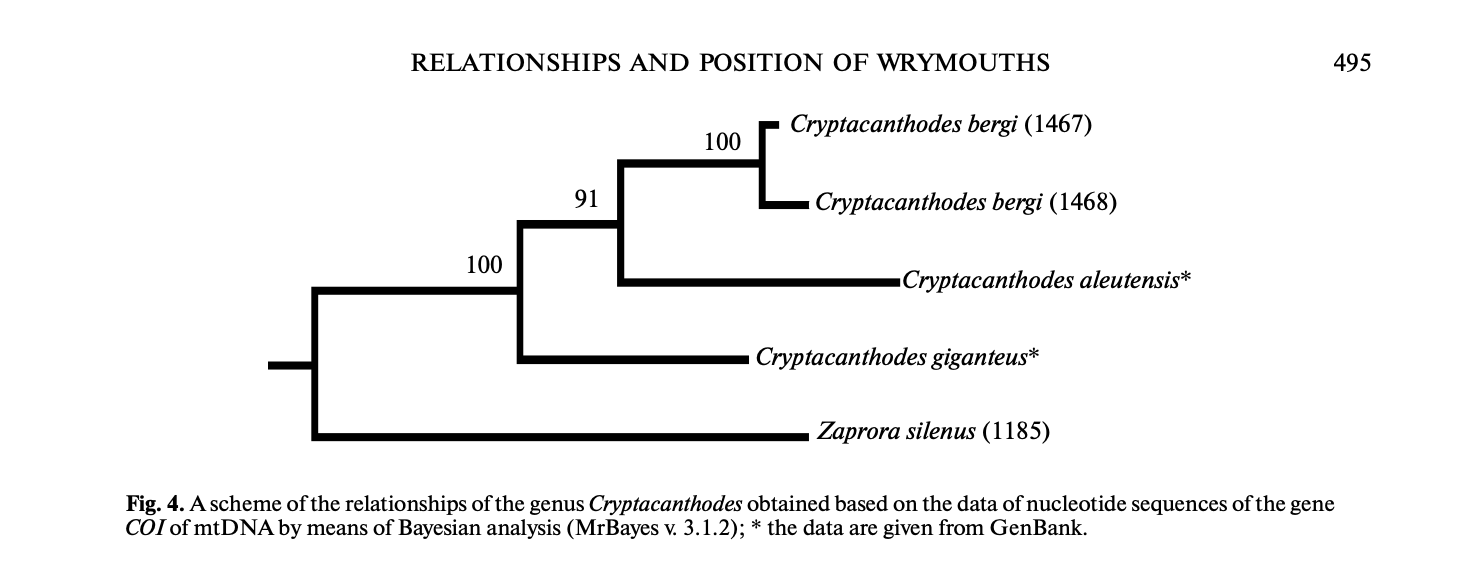

== Systematics ==
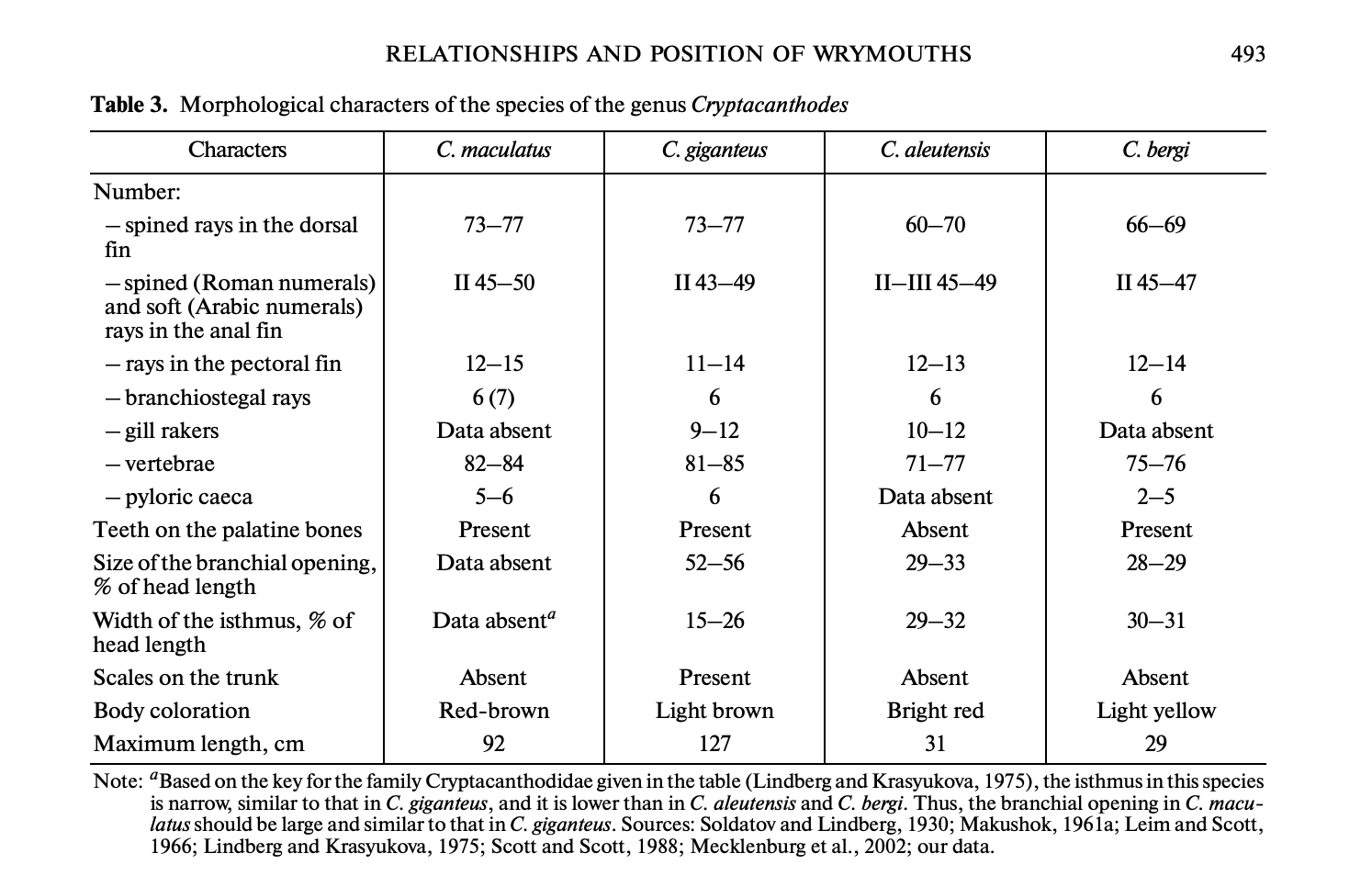

The family Cryptacanthodidae has four species recognized within: Cryptacanthodes maculatus, Cryptacanthodes aleutensis, Cryptacanthodes bergi, and of course Cryptacanthodes giganteus. There was systematic confusion until Dr. David Humphreys Storer (1804-1891) organized them into the Cryptacanthodes family by anatomic similarity which was soon after confirmed with a cladistic analysis that they were a monophyletic group. The Giant Wrymouth was previously described in the genera Ophidium and Delolipis before Storer’s classification. A study was done by O. A. Radchenko in order to analyze the position of Cryptacanthodes in the suborder of Zoarcoidei. Zoarcidei has nine units within, with the position of Cryptacanthodidae was then determined. The analysis showed a strong divergence from Zoarcoidei and highly suggested that the Wrymouth’s diverged from one common ancestor. This was concluded by the morphological similarities between C. giganteus and C. maculatus. They analyzed four specific morphological features that are classified as adaptive to the Wrymouths and are connected with their unique life underground. The first feature that differs is the large skull cavity that protrudes anteriorly, the lateral walls of the skull cavity in the orbital part are formed by lower protrusions of the frontals and upper protrusions of the parashenoid; the olfactory nerves are located inside the skull cavity. The second distinguishing feature are the large and wide semisensory canals in the head, completely covered by skin. The third trait are the substantially elongated radials on the pectoral girdle. And finally, the last feature are short lateral wings on the lateral ethmoids which are almost totally covered by the frontals. While several members of the suborder Zoarcoidei have a similar ground dwelling life, none are so unique as the Wrymouths. The changes in the semisensory system in the head are seen in other groups of demersal fishes. The increased spaces of the canals play a role of resonators used for strengthening of water oscillations, it plays a protective and transmitting role. Analyzing these traits has helped to distinguish the secret life of the Wrymouths or at least get a better understanding of them.

The image below highlights these morphological adaptations unique to the Wrymouths.

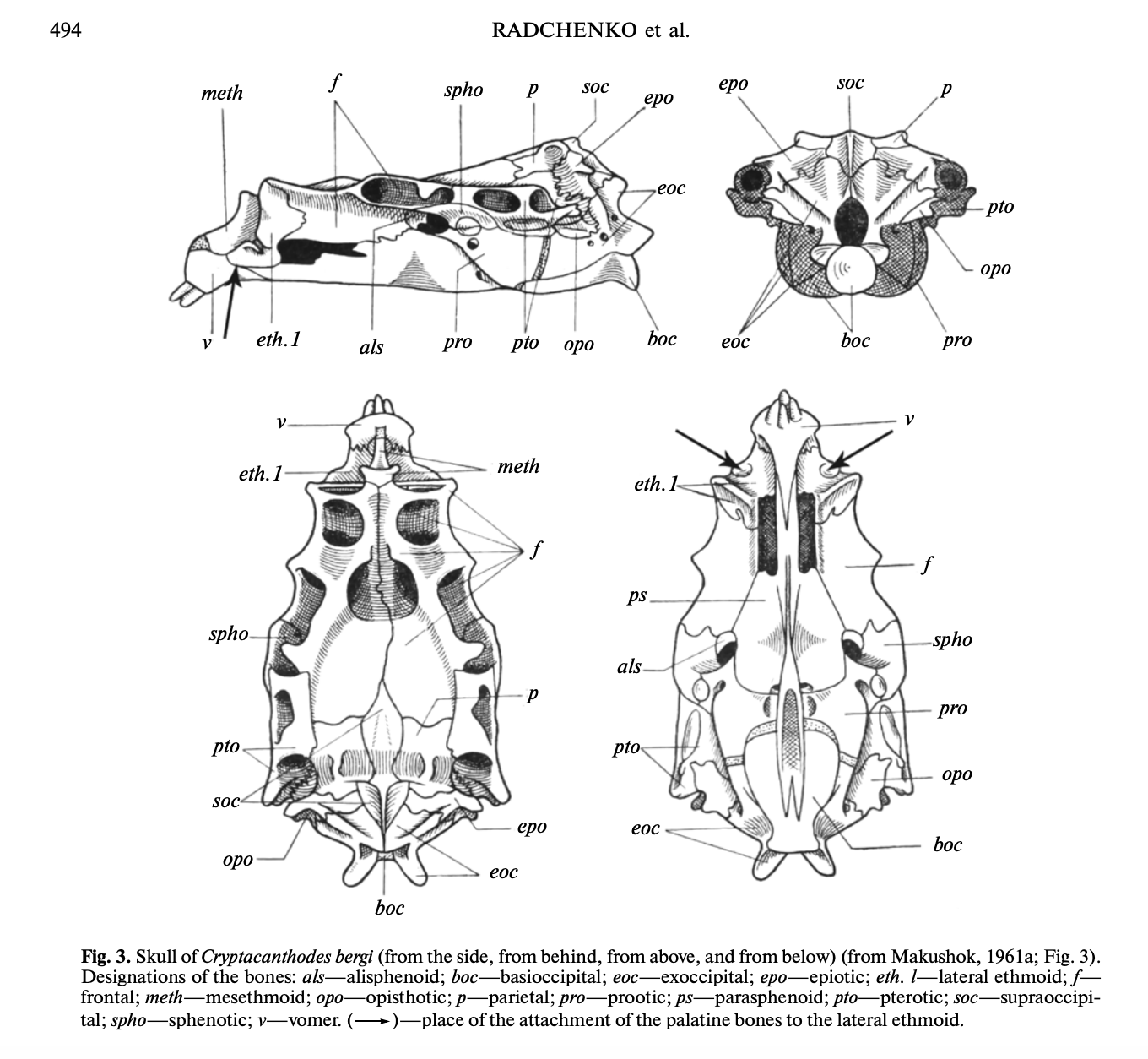

== Distribution ==
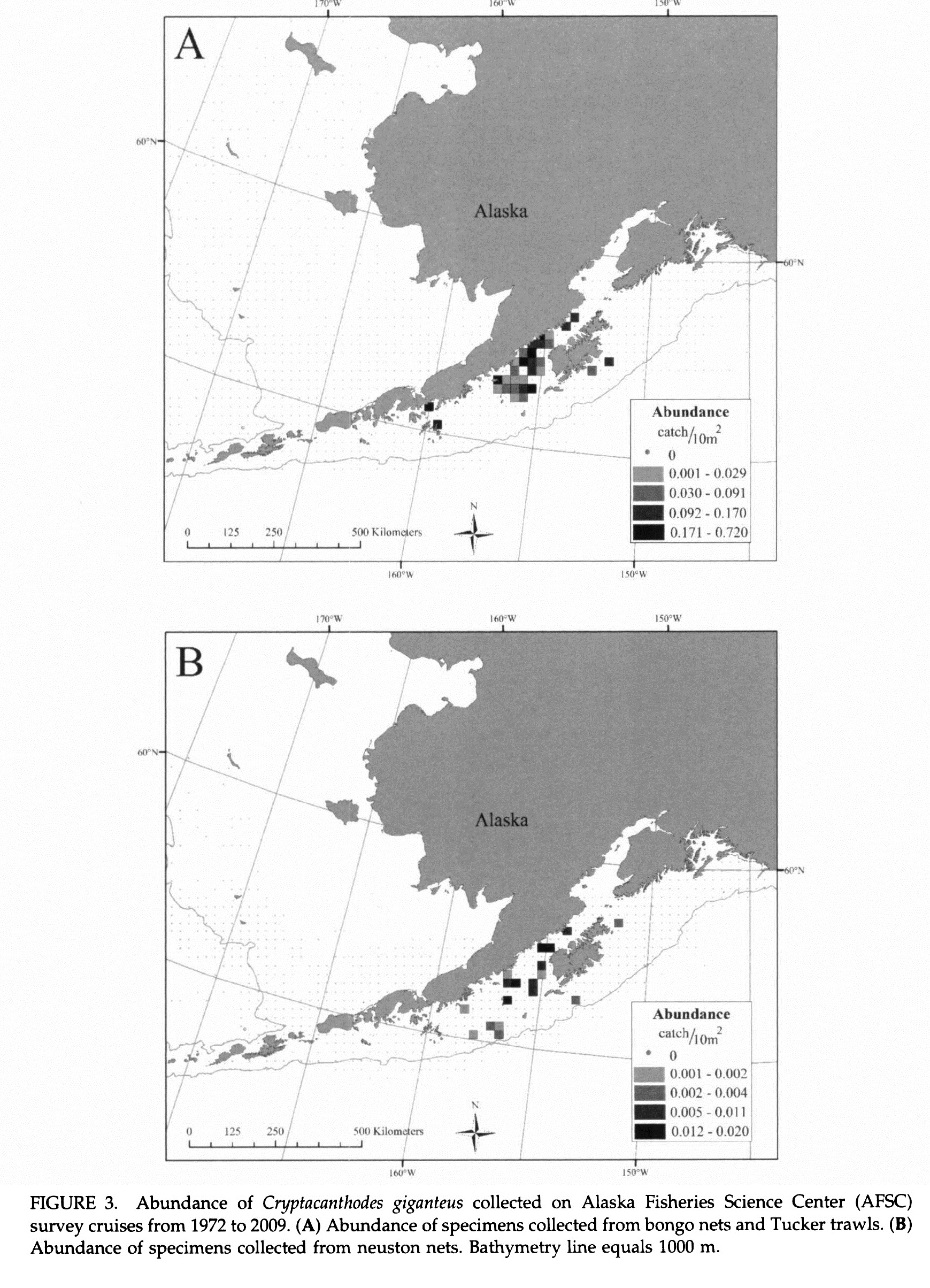

The Giant Wrymouth is found in the eastern North Pacific ranging from the Bering Sea to the coast of northern California. Specifically along the Alaska Peninsula, in the Alaska Bay, and to the south along the coast of North America (Humboldt Bay). As mentioned above, in the larval stage they live on the tumultuous surface of the water. As they mature they, like all Cryptacanthodidae, are demersal and live on the deep, soft bottom of the tidal zone shelf and upper part of the continental slope and sometimes up to 350 m deep. The fish can be found at depths of 6 to and up to 128 m, however they are usually found in a depth less than 20 m. On the deep ocean sandy floors they burrow to create intricate structures and tunnels throughout the silty bottom. Their burrows are typically 3–8 cm from the surface of the bottom and have numerous exits.

== Life History ==
Due to their unique burrowing system, when the Giant Wrymouth is mature, they feed on small amphipods and shrimps. A study on humpback shrimp in British Columbia, a benthic species, shows that a main predator on their juvenile and adult life stage is the Giant Wryfish. The study also shows that other species that may prey on the shrimp include eelpouts, english sole, sand sole, pricklebacks, staghorn sculpins, great sculpin, red rock crabs, and graceful crabs. It is unknown how the Giant Wryfish interacts but it is possible that at the least they are competition for food sources. Little is known on the specifics on the Giant Wryfish, however a study was conducted on the diet of Cryptacanthodes maculatus which is commonly known as the Wrymouth. Due to their similar life history as benthic soft bottom fish some of the conclusions drawn may be the same. Annelids and arthropods were among the most highly consumed by the Wrymouth. The study showed that nine species of amphipods, two species of mysid shrimp, one isopod, and one decapod were among arthropods found in the Wrymouth’s stomach. A couple of demersal fish which were intact were also found in the stomach contents. This shows that the Wrymouth is an important benthic predatory fish in the community that preys on soft-bottom residents. The findings indicate that the Wrymouth is a generalist feeder that may play a role in organizing the benthic inter/subtidal community.

The Giant Wrymouth spawn in the early spring where their neustonic young are thought to feed on plankton at the top of water. The neuston makes for a harsh environment for young but with some unexpected benefits such as high growth rate and more prey compared to the deeper water.

== Conservation status ==
There is relatively little known about the conservation status of the Giant Wrymouth except for Canada. NatureServe Explorer indicates that Canada's conservation status is listed as N4 which stands for apparently secure. This means it has no apparent threats and is commonly found throughout the area. To back this up, other sources claim that as a family, there is no commercial interest in the cryptacanthodids and the burrowing adults are rarely caught.
