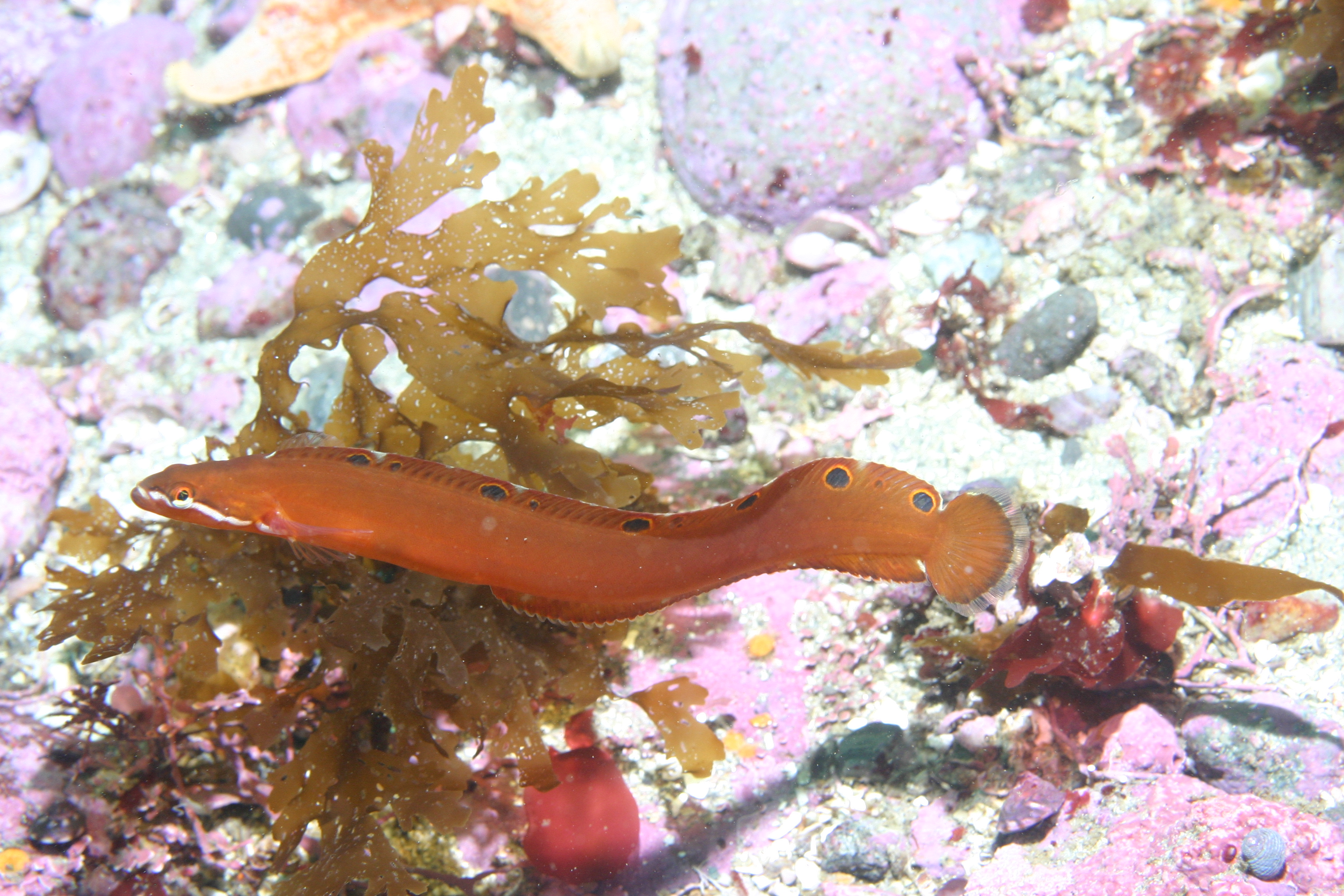

Scientific classification
- Kingdom: Animalia
- Phylum: Chordata
- Class: Actinopterygii
- Order: Perciformes
- Family: Opisthocentridae
- Genus: Kasatkia
- Species: K. seigeli

Binomial name
- Kasatkia seigeli Posner & Lavenberg, 1999

= Six-spot prickleback =

Species of fish

The six-spot prickelback (Kasatkia seigeli) is a species of marine ray-finned fish of belonging to the family Stichaeidae, the pricklebacks and shannies. It is found in the eastern North Pacific Ocean.

== Taxonomy ==
The six-spot prickleback was first formalled described in 1999 by Mason Posner and Robert J. Lavenberg with the type locality given as Intake Cove, off the Diablo Canyon Power Plant in San Luis Obispo County, California. It is one of 2 known species in the genus Kasatkia, the other being the type species, K. memorabilis, from the western North Pacific. The existence of this fish was known prior to its formal description but ichthyologists were unsure whether it belonged to Kasatkia or the closely related Askoldia until it was formally described. The specific name honors Jeffrey A. Seigel, who was the manager of the fish collection at the Los Angeles County Museum of Natural History in recognition of his "many years of hard work on the fishes of California".

== Description ==
The six-spot prickleback is distinguished from its congener by there being scales present on the cheek and on the head, by having 6 eye-like spots on the dorsal fin rather than 12-14, the dorsal fin has 41-44 spines compared to 43-47 and the nal fin has 2 or 3 spines and 39-41 soft rays compared to 2 spines and 45-49 soft rays. If there are pelvic fins these have a single spine whereas this is absent in K. memorabilis. It has large pectoral fins which contain 18-20 fin rays and its lateral line has a dorsal branch. The overall color of the body is brownish tan marked with pale greenish cream blotches and the ventral surface is uniform cream in color. There is a white line running through the eye to the pectoral fin and this is below and bordering a reddish line in front of the eye. This species attains a maximum standard length of 8.2 cm (3.2 in).

== Distribution and habitat ==
The six-spot prickleback is found in the eastern Pacific Ocean where it is known only from northern and central California/ This species is demersal and occurs at depths between 6 and 26 m (20 and 85 ft).
