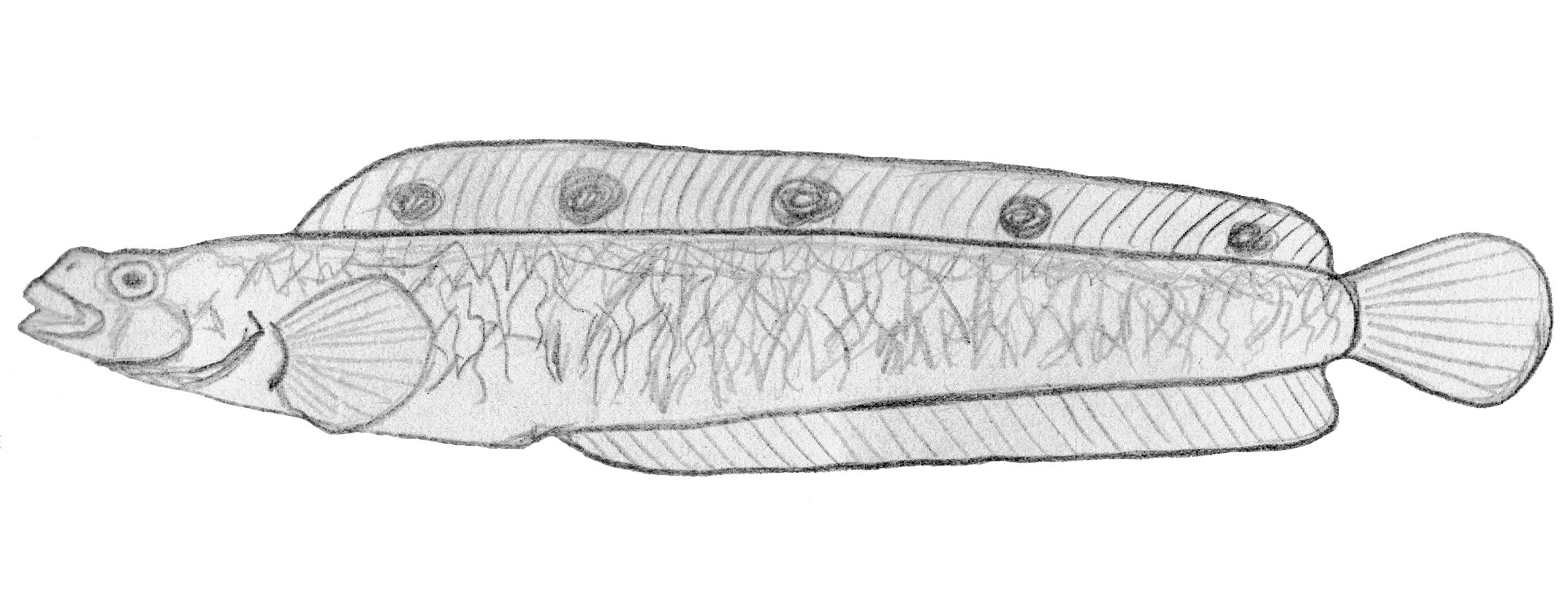
- Opisthocentrus ocellatus

Scientific classification
- Kingdom: Animalia
- Phylum: Chordata
- Class: Actinopterygii
- Order: Perciformes
- Family: Opisthocentridae
- Genus: Opisthocentrus; Kner, 1868

Type species
- Centronotus quinquemaculatus a synonym of Opisthocentrus ocellatus Kner, 1868

Synonyms
- Abryois Jordan & Snyder, 1902; Blenniophidium Boulenger, 1893

= Opisthocentrus =

Genus of fishes

Opisthocentrus is a genus of marine ray-finned fishes belonging to the family Stichaeidae, the pricklebacks or shannies. These fishes are found in the North Pacific Ocean.

== Taxonomy ==
Opisthocentrus was first proposed as a monospecific genus in 1868 by the Austrian ichthyologist Rudolf Kner when he described its type species Centronotus quinquemaculatus from "Pinang", although this was probably De Kastri Bay on the Tatar Strait in the northern Sea of Japan. C. quinqumaculatus has since been considered to be a junior synonym of Ophidium ocellatus which had been described by Tilesius in 1811. The genus is placed in the subfamily Opisthocentrinae within the family Stichaeidae by some authorities, while others treat the subfamily as a valid family, the Ophistocentridae.

== Species ==
Opisthocentrus contains the following species:

- Opisthocentrus ocellatus (Tilesius, 1811)
- Opisthocentrus tenuis T.H. Bean & B.A. Bean, 1897
- Opisthocentrus zonope Jordan & Snyder, 1902

== Characteristics ==
Opisthocentrus fishes are similar in shape to Askoldia and Pholidapus but the adults of this genus are notably smaller in size. They share having three sensory pores between the eyes and three on the joint of the occipital. They also have a uniformly spaces row of between four and eight round dark spots on the dorsal fin and two to four dark bars across the head. The origin of the anal fin is below the 21st to 24th spines in the dorsal fin. The largest species is O. ocellatus which has a maximum published total length of 20 cm (7.9 in).

== Distribution and habitat ==
Opisthocentrus fishes are found in the northwestern Pacific Ocean in the waters of Japan, Russia and Korea. They are demersal fishes living close to the shore in algal beds.
