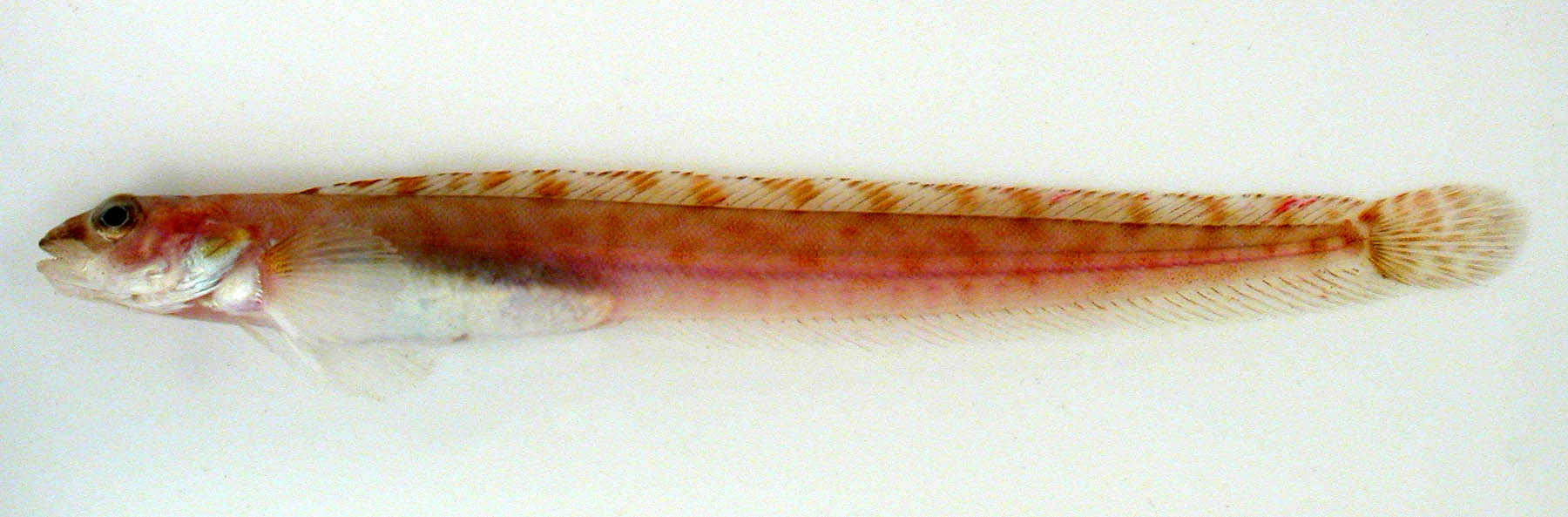
- Stout Eelblenny (Anisarchus medius)

Scientific classification
- Kingdom: Animalia
- Phylum: Chordata
- Class: Actinopterygii
- Order: Perciformes
- Family: Lumpenidae
- Genus: Anisarchus; Gill, 1864

Type species
- Clinus medius Reinhardt 1837

= Anisarchus =

Genus of fishes

Anisarchus is a genus of marine ray-finned fishes belonging to the family Lumpenidae, the eel pricklebacks. These fishes are found in the North Pacific Ocean.

== Species ==
Anisarchus contains the following species:

- Anisarchus macrops (Matsubara & Ochiai, 1952)
- Anisarchus medius (Reinhardt, 1837)
