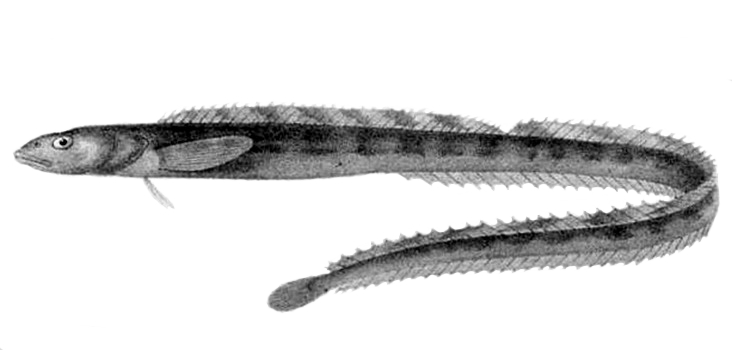

Scientific classification
- Kingdom: Animalia
- Phylum: Chordata
- Class: Actinopterygii
- Division: Teleostei
- Order: Perciformes
- Family: Lumpenidae
- Genus: Lumpenus
- Species: L. lampretaeformis

Binomial name
- Lumpenus lampretaeformis (Walbaum, 1792)

Synonyms
- Blennius lampretaeformis Walbaum, 1792; Centrnotus islandicus Bloch & Schneider, 1801; Clinus mohrii Krøyer, 1836; Lumpenus gracilis Reinhardt, 1837; Clinus nebulosus Fries, 1838; Blennius gracilis Stuwitz, 1838; Blennius serpentinus Storer, 1855

= Lumpenus lampretaeformis =

Species of fish

Lumpenus lampretaeformis, the snakeblenny, is a species of marine ray-finned fish belonging to the family Stichaeidae, the pricklebacks and shannies.

It is native to the coasts of Northern Atlantic Ocean.
