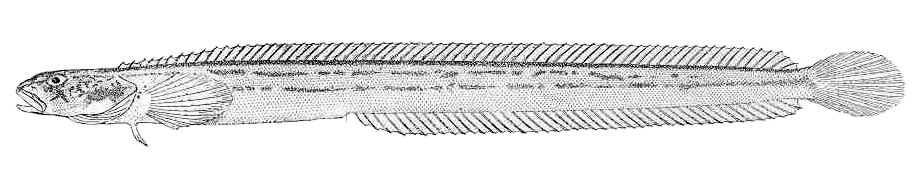

Scientific classification
- Kingdom: Animalia
- Phylum: Chordata
- Class: Actinopterygii
- Order: Perciformes
- Suborder: Zoarcoidei
- Family: Lumpenidae
- Genus: Acantholumpenus; Makushok, 1958
- Species: A. mackayi

Binomial name
- Acantholumpenus mackayi (Gilbert, 1896)

Synonyms
- Lumpenus mackayi Gilbert, 1896; Lumpenus fowleri Jordan & Snyder, 1902

= Pighead prickleback =

Species of fish

The pighead prickleback (Acantholumpenus mackayi), also known as the blackline prickleback, is a species of marine ray-finned fish belonging to the family Lumpenidae, the eel pricklebacks. It is the only species in the monotypic genus Acantholumpenus. This fish is found in the Arctic and North Pacific Oceans.
