= Lumpenopsis =

Scientific classification
- Kingdom: Animalia
- Phylum: Chordata
- Class: Actinopterygii
- Order: Perciformes
- Family: Opisthocentridae
- Genus: Lumpenopsis; Soldatov, 1916

Type species
- Lumpenopsis pavlenkoi Soldatov, 1916

Synonyms
- Allolumpenus Hubbs & Schultz, 1932

Genus of fishes

Lumpenopsis is a genus of marine ray-finned fishes belonging to the family Opisthocentridae, the rearspined fin pricklebacks. These fishes are found in the North Pacific Ocean.

== Taxonomy ==
Lumpenopsis was first proposed as a monospecific genus in 1916 by the Russian zoologist Vladimir Soldatov when he described Lumpenopsis pavlenkoi from Peter the Great Bay on the Sea of Japan, which was its only species and which Soldatov also designated as its type species. The genus is placed in the family Ophistocentridae.

== Etymology ==
Lumpenopsis means "similar in appearance to Lumpenus, although this genus has some differs by having teeth on the vomer, lower dorsal fin spines and in the gill membranes not being joined to the isthmus.

== Species ==
Lumpenopsis contains the following species:

- Lumpenopsis clitella Hastings & Walker, 2003
- Lumpenopsis hypochroma (Hubbs & Schultz, 1932)
- Lumpenopsis pavlenkoi Soldatov, 1916
- Lumpenopsis triocellata (Matsubara, 1943)

== Characteristics ==
Lumpenopsis fishes have very elongated, eel-like bodies which are laterally compressed with a long head which has an elongated snout. The large eyes are placed high on the head which has no tentacles or cirrhi. There are thin bands of teeth on the jaws and there are vomerine teeth. There are a large number of spines making up the dorsal fin. The pectoral fins are large, their length being greater than half the length of the head. These fishes have pelvic fins which have a single spine and 3 soft rays. The anal fin has 2 spines at its origin and forked soft rays. The dorsal and anal fins touch the base of the caudal fin. The gill membranes have a wide fusion but do not join with the isthmus. They are small fishes, the largest species being L. triocellata which s a maximum published standard length of 11 cm (4.3 in).

== Distribution ==
Lumpenopsis pricklebacks are found in the eastern and western parts of the North Pacific Ocean.
