= Longsnout prickleback =

Scientific classification
- Kingdom: Animalia
- Phylum: Chordata
- Class: Actinopterygii
- Order: Perciformes
- Suborder: Zoarcoidei
- Family: Lumpenidae
- Genus: Lumpenella; Makushok, 1958
- Species: L. longirostris

Binomial name
- Lumpenella longirostris (Evermann & Goldsborough, 1907)

Synonyms
- Lumpenus longirostris Evermann & Goldsborough, 1907; Lumpenella nigricans Matsubara & Ochiai, 1952

Species of fish

The longsnout prickleback (Lumpenella longirostris), also known as the longsnouted blenny, is a species of marine ray-finned fish belonging to the family Lumpenidae, the eel pricklebacks, the pricklebacks and shannies. It is the only species in the monotypic genus Lumpenella. This fish is found in the Arctic and North Pacific Oceans.
