= Whitebarred prickleback =

Scientific classification
- Kingdom: Animalia
- Phylum: Chordata
- Class: Actinopterygii
- Order: Perciformes
- Suborder: Zoarcoidei
- Family: Lumpenidae
- Genus: Poroclinus; T.H. Bean, 1890
- Species: P. rothrocki

Binomial name
- Poroclinus rothrocki T.H. Bean, 1890

Species of fish

The whitebarred prickleback (Poroclinus rothrocki), also known as the whitebarred blenny, is a species of marine ray-finned fish belonging to the family Lumpenidae, the eel pricklebacks, the pricklebacks and shannies. It is the only species in the monotypic genus Poroclinus. This fish is found in the eastern Pacific Ocean.
