= Snake blenny (disambiguation) =

- Lumpenus lampretaeformis - fish of the family Stichaeidae.
- Ophidion barbatum - fish of the family Ophidiidae.
- Xiphasia setifer - fish of the family Blenniidae.
