= Xenolumpenus =

Scientific classification
- Kingdom: Animalia
- Phylum: Chordata
- Class: Actinopterygii
- Order: Perciformes
- Suborder: Zoarcoidei
- Family: Lumpenidae
- Genus: Xenolumpenus; Shinohara & Yabe, 2009
- Species: X. longipterus

Binomial name
- Xenolumpenus longipterus Shinohara & Yabe, 2009

Genus of fishes

Xenolumpenus is a monotypic genus of marine ray-finned fishes belonging to the family Lumpenidae, the eel pricklebacks, the pricklebacks and shannies. Its only species is Xenolumpenus longipterus which is found in the northwestern Pacific Ocean.
