= Neolumpenus =

Scientific classification
- Kingdom: Animalia
- Phylum: Chordata
- Class: Actinopterygii
- Order: Perciformes
- Suborder: Zoarcoidei
- Family: Lumpenidae
- Genus: Neolumpenus; Miki, Kanamaru & Amaoka, 1987
- Species: N. unocellatus

Binomial name
- Neolumpenus unocellatus Miki, Kanamaru & Amaoka, 1987

Genus of fishes

Neolumpenus is a monotypic genus of marine ray-finned fishes belonging to the family Lumpenidae, the eel pricklebacks, the pricklebacks and shannies. Its only species is Neolumpenus unocellatus which is found in the northwestern Pacific Ocean.
