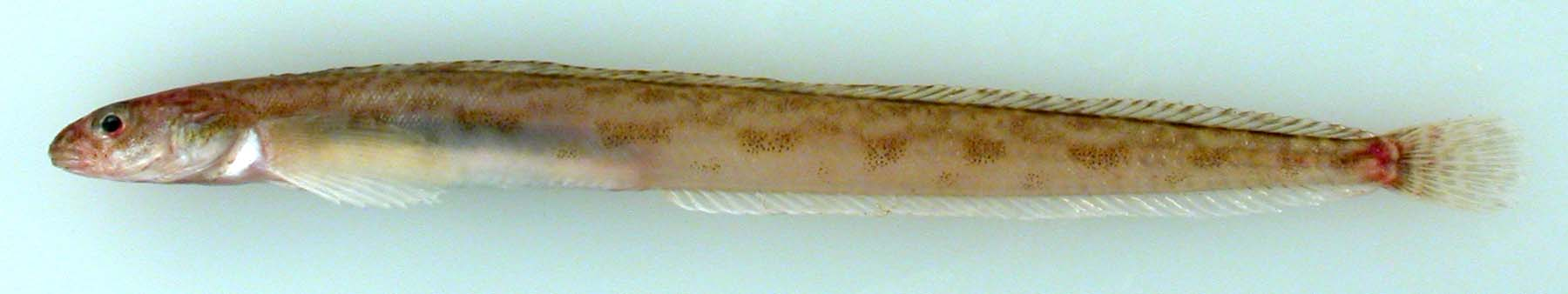
- Slender eelblenny (Lumpenus fabricii)

Scientific classification
- Kingdom: Animalia
- Phylum: Chordata
- Class: Actinopterygii
- Order: Perciformes
- Suborder: Zoarcoidei
- Family: Lumpenidae; Jordan & Evermann, 1898

Genera
- See text

= Lumpenidae =

Lumpenidae Temporal range: Early/Middle Miocene to present

Subfamily of fishes

Lumpenidae, the eel pricklebacks, is a family of marine ray-finned fishes, classified within the suborder Zoarcoidei. These fishes are found in the North Pacific, Arctic and North Atlantic Oceans. An indeterminate fossil lumpenid is known from the early-middle Miocene-aged Bessho Formation of Honshu, Japan.

== Genera ==
The subfamily contains the following genera:

- Acantholumpenus Makushok, 1958
- Anisarchus Gill, 1864
- Leptoclinus Gill, 1861
- Lumpenella Hubbs, 1927
- Lumpenus Reinhardt, 1836
- Neolumpenus Miki, Kanamaru & Amaoka, 1987
- Poroclinus T.H. Bean, 1890
- Xenolumpenus Shinohara & Yabe, 2009
