= Neck-banded blenny =

Scientific classification
- Kingdom: Animalia
- Phylum: Chordata
- Class: Actinopterygii
- Order: Perciformes
- Family: Eulophiidae
- Genus: Leptostichaeus; Miki, 1985
- Species: L. pumilus

Binomial name
- Leptostichaeus pumilus Miki, 1985

Species of fish

The neck-banded blenny (Leptostichaeus pumilus) is a species of marine ray-finned fish belonging to the family Eulophiidae, the spinous eelpouts. it is the only species in the monotypic genus Leptostichaeus. This fish is found in the northwestern Pacific Ocean.
