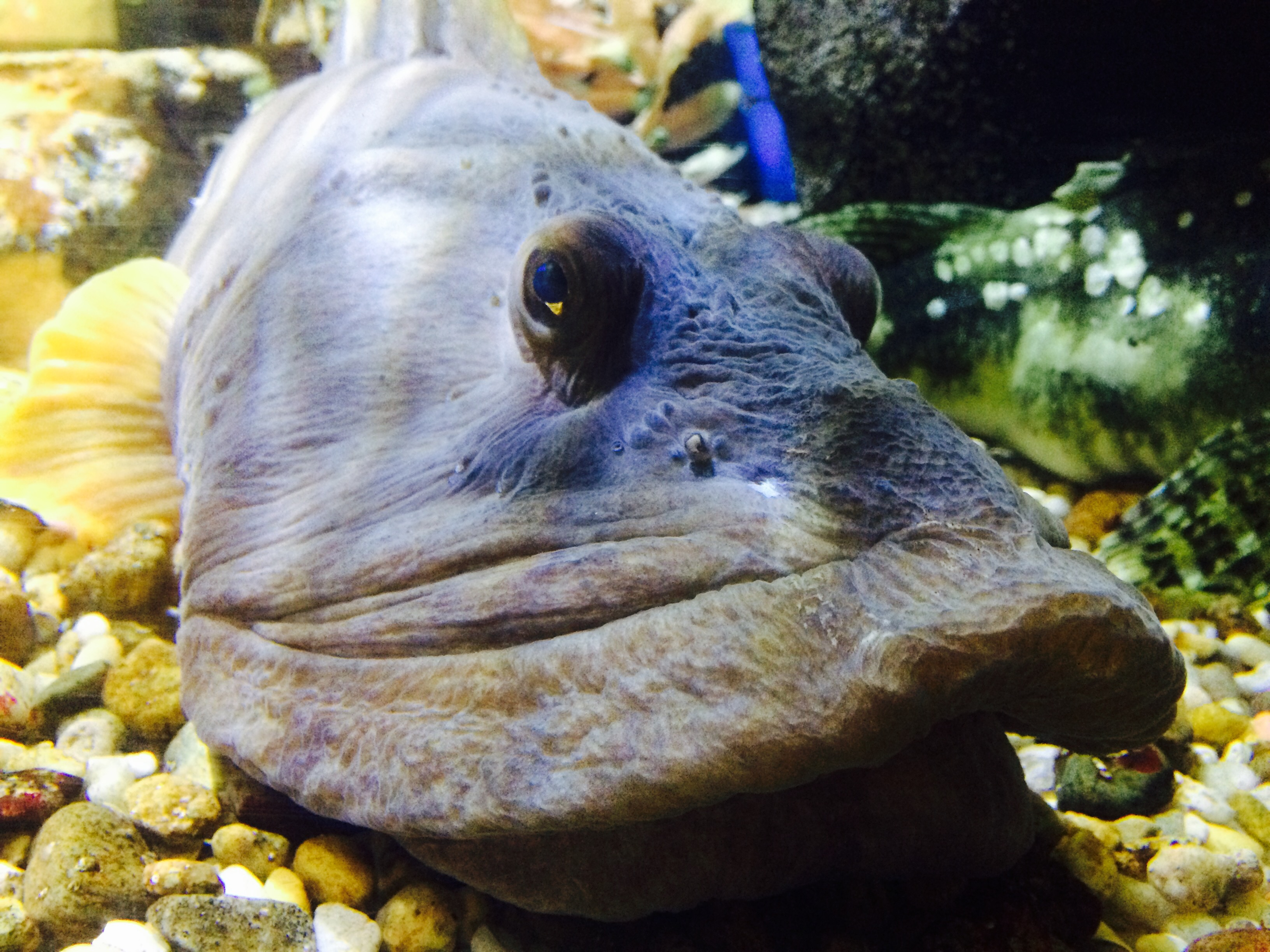
- Ocean pout at the Woods Hole Science Aquarium

Scientific classification
- Kingdom: Animalia
- Phylum: Chordata
- Class: Actinopterygii
- Order: Perciformes
- Family: Zoarcidae
- Genus: Zoarces
- Species: Z. americanus

Binomial name
- Zoarces americanus (Bloch & Schneider, 1801)

Synonyms
- Blennius americanus Bloch & Schneider, 1801; Macrozoarces americanus (Bloch & Schneider, 1801); Blennius viviparus unicolor Walbaum, 1792; Blennius anguillaris Peck, 1804; Zoarces anguillaris (Peck, 1804); Blennius ciliatus Mitchill, 1814; Blennius labrosus Mitchill, 1815; Zoarces gronovii Valenciennes, 1836; Blennius gronovii (Valenciennes, 1836)

= Ocean pout =

Species of fish

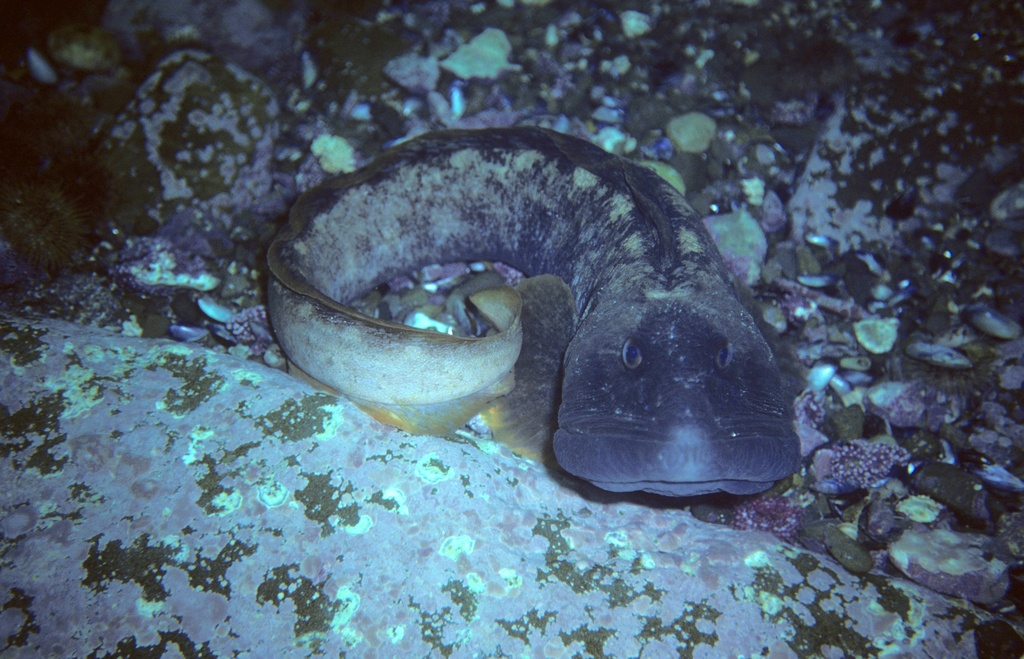
Ocean pout, Newfoundland, Canada

The ocean pout (Zoarces americanus) is an eelpout in the family Zoarcidae. It is found in the Northwest Atlantic Ocean, off the coast of New England and eastern Canada. The fish has antifreeze proteins in its blood, giving it the ability to survive in near-freezing waters.

== Taxonomy ==
The ocean pout was first formally described in 1801 by the German naturalists Marcus Elieser Bloch and Johann Gottlob Theaenus Schneider with its type locality given as "American seas". It is one of six species in the genus Zoarces, the only genus in the subfamily Zoarcinae which is one of four subfamilies in the eelpout family Zoarcidae.

== Description ==
The ocean pout is distinguished by its long, narrowing body and a broad mouth with thick, fleshy lips, with the upper lip extending beyond the lower. This species varies in color from yellow through to reddish brown and to grayish-green and is marked with a series of cross like markings running the length of the eel-like body. There is a dark brown line on each side of the head running from the upper rear margin of the eye to the edge of the operculum. The long, continuous dorsal fin does not connect with the caudal fin, however, the anal fin does. The teeth are robust, blunt and conical in shape. The ocean pout is the largest species of eelpout and has reached a maximum published total length of 110 cm (43 in).

== Distribution and habitat ==
The ocean pout is found in the western Atlantic Ocean where it occurs from Labrador in Canada south to Delaware. They are bottom living species typically found on soft substrates of sand and mud but which can be found in rocky areas too, they occur at depths between 0 and 388 m (0 and 1,273 ft).

== Biology ==
The ocean pout is a predatory species which feeds on invertebrates such as bivalves, sea urchins, sand dollars, brittle stars, and crabs, worms, and some fish. They are at least partially migratory with the fishes in the Gulf of Maine moving offshore during the summer and returning to shallower coastal waters in the Spring while the fish from Georges Bank and New Jersey they move to cooler rocky areas in summer and return to the softer substrates in the Fall. In September and October the adults gather in rocky areas to breed. The females lay a gelatinous mass of eggs which they guard until they hatch, typically 2–3 months.

== Use in genetic modification ==
Scientists have succeeded in taking genes from ocean pout and implanting those into the Atlantic salmon. The promoter for the antifreeze protein gene is used in conjunction with a growth hormone gene from Chinook salmon, which leads to a higher concentration of the growth hormone in the blood, causing the genetically modified salmon to grow much more rapidly. These transgenic salmon reach a harvest weight in two-thirds of the time that it takes their unmodified counterparts. Controversy has arisen, as some view genetically altered salmon as a potential threat to wild salmon stocks should it escape into the wild. AquaBounty Technologies has attempted to address these concerns by stating that all of the transgenic salmon to be intended for sale will be sterile females. As of late 2017, several tons have been sold in Canada, and final approvals and decisions on labeling are pending in the United States. Some restaurant and grocery store chains in the United States have announced they will not sell the new fish, citing concerns over its safety for human consumption, despite no scientific evidence showing a risk.

In June 2006, the Unilever company announced that it would research the potential use of genetically modified yeast to grow antifreeze proteins based on a gene from the ocean pout, and use proteins extracted from the yeast to improve the consistency and storage properties of ice cream. Incorporating these ice-structuring proteins means that a lower cream content, and thus a lower calorie content, ice cream can be manufactured without the risk of ice crystal formation.
