= Azygopterus =

Scientific classification
- Kingdom: Animalia
- Phylum: Chordata
- Class: Actinopterygii
- Order: Perciformes
- Family: Eulophiidae
- Genus: Azygopterus; Andriashev & Makushok, 1955
- Species: A. corallinus

Binomial name
- Azygopterus corallinus Andriashev & Makushok, 1955

Genus of fishes

Azygopterus is a monotypic genus of marine ray-finned fish belonging to the family Eulophiidae, the spinous eelpouts. Its only species is Azygopterus corallinus which is found in the northwestern Pacific Ocean.
