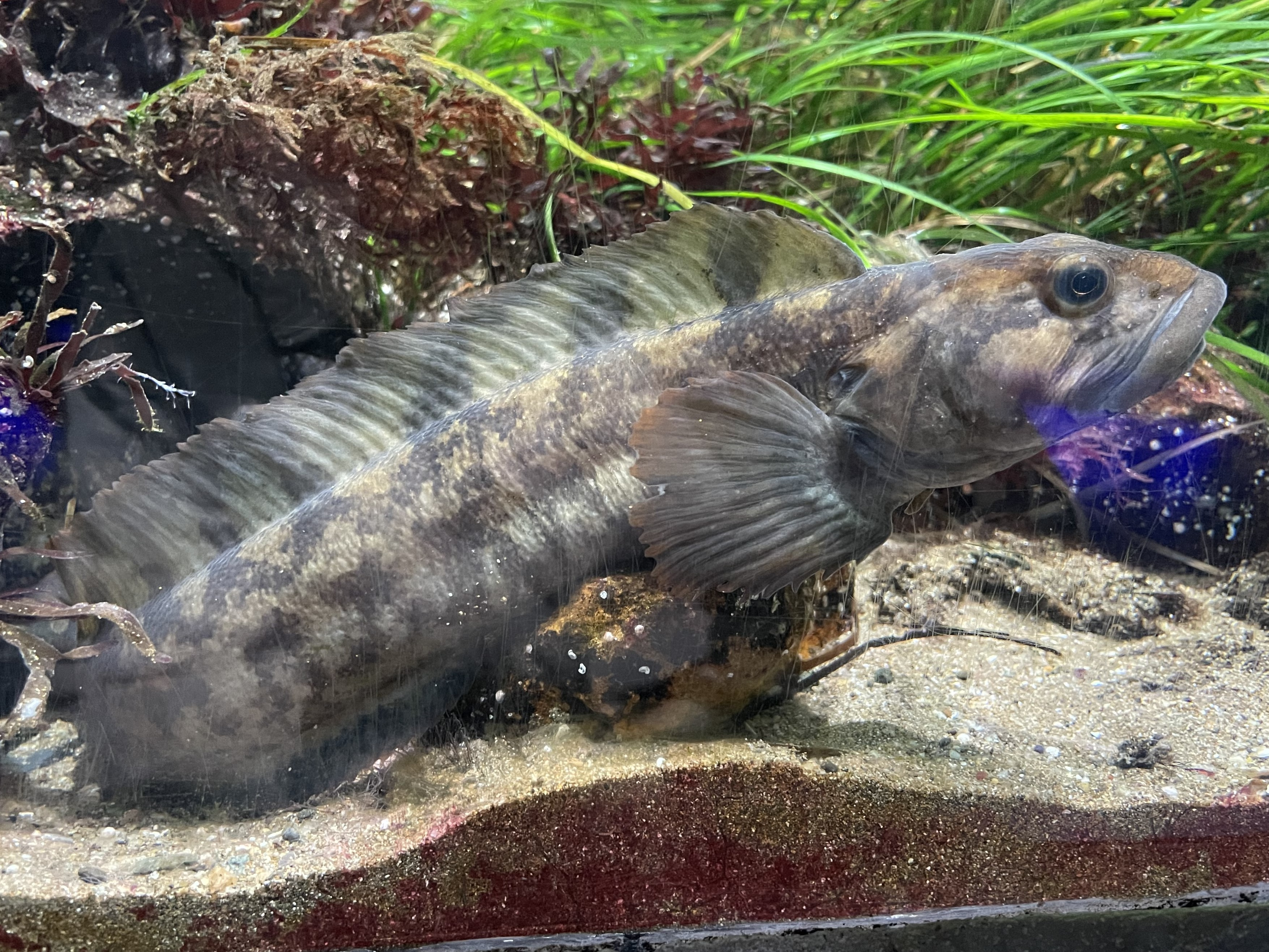

Scientific classification
- Kingdom: Animalia
- Phylum: Chordata
- Class: Actinopterygii
- Order: Perciformes
- Family: Zoarcidae
- Genus: Zoarces
- Species: Z. elongatus

Binomial name
- Zoarces elongatus Kner, 1868

Synonyms
- Enchelyopus elongatus (Kner, 1868)

= Zoarces elongatus =

Species of fish

Zoarces elongatus, the eastern viviparous blenny, is an eelpout in the family Zoarcidae. Z. elongatus was described by Rudolf Kner in 1868. The species is endemic to the Northwest Pacific, in such areas as the Sea of Japan and the Sea of Okhotsk and the coastal waters of China.
