= Zoarces gillii =

Scientific classification
- Kingdom: Animalia
- Phylum: Chordata
- Class: Actinopterygii
- Order: Perciformes
- Family: Zoarcidae
- Genus: Zoarces
- Species: Z. gillii

Binomial name
- Zoarces gillii Jordan & Starks, 1905

Synonyms
- Zoarces tangwangi Wu, 1930

Species of fish

Zoarces gillii is an eelpout in the family Zoarcidae, found between Japan and eastern Korea, mainly in the Yellow Sea. Z. gillii was first described by the american ichthyologists, David Starr Jordan and Edwin Chapin Starks in 1905.
