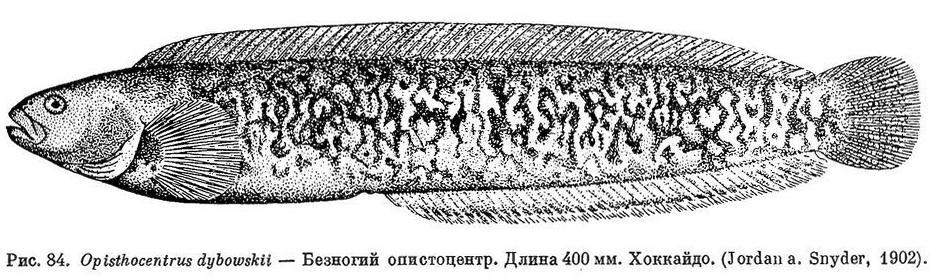

Scientific classification
- Kingdom: Animalia
- Phylum: Chordata
- Class: Actinopterygii
- Order: Perciformes
- Suborder: Zoarcoidei
- Family: Opisthocentridae
- Genus: Pholidapus; T.H. Bean & B.A. Bean, 1897
- Species: P. dybowskii

Binomial name
- Pholidapus dybowskii (Steindachner, 1880)

Synonyms
- Genus: Abryois Jordan & Snyder, 1902; Species: Centronotus dybowskii Steindachner, 1880; Opisthocentrus dybowskii (Steindachner, 1880); Pholidapus grebnitskii T.H. Bean & B.A. Bean, 1897; Abryois azumae Jordan & Snyder, 1902

= Pholidapus =

Genus of fishes

Pholidapus is a monotypic genus of marine ray-finned fishes belonging to the family Opisthocentridae, the rearspined fin pricklebacks. Its only species is Pholidapus dybowskii, which is found in the northwestern Pacific Ocean.

== Taxonomy ==
Pholidapus was first proposed as a monospecific genus in 1897 by the American ichthyologists, the brothers Tarleton Hoffman Bean and Barton Appler Bean, when they described a new species, Pholidapus grebnitskii, from Japan. P. grebnitskii was later shown to be a junior synonym of Centronotus dybowskii, which had been described in 1880 by Franz Steindachner from the Gulf of Strelok near Vladivostok in Russia. This taxon is placed in the family Ophistocentridae.

== Etymology ==
Pholidapus refers to the genus's similarity to the genus Pholis, and combines that name with apus, which means "no foot", a reference to the lack of pelvic fins. The specific name most likely honours the Polish biologist Benedykt Dybowski, who worked on the zoology of the Russian Far East.

== Description ==
Pholidapus has a similar eel-like shaped body to that of Pholis, with a small, compressed head that lacks scales. It has no pelvic fin. There are between 60 and 65 spines in the dorsal fin, and the anterior spines are flexible, but the posterior third of the spines are rigid. There are 2 spines and 38 to 41 soft rays in the anal fin. The pectoral fin is large and has 18 or 19 fin rays. There are 1 or 2 black spots on the dorsal fin. The last tooth at the back of the upper jaw is shaped like a canine. The body is greenish to yellowish brown in colour. It may have irregular horizontal and vertical streaking; this tends to become obscured towards the tail and belly. The pectoral fin, the lower side of the head, and the abdomen are greenish to orange yellow. The caudal fin is greyish on its basal third, the rest being greyish orange with a white edge. The dorsal fin is brownish grey with a number of greenish black or blue spots. The anal fin is olive with a white margin. There is a dark brown base to the pectoral fin. The maximum published total length for P. dybowski is 46 cm (18 in).

== Distribution and habitat ==
Pholidapus is found in the western North Pacific Ovcean, where it occurs near the southern Kuril Islands, and in the northwestern Sea of Okhotsk south to Hokkaido and the northern Sea of Japan. This taxon lives in bends of algae close to the shore as deep as 146 m (479 ft).
