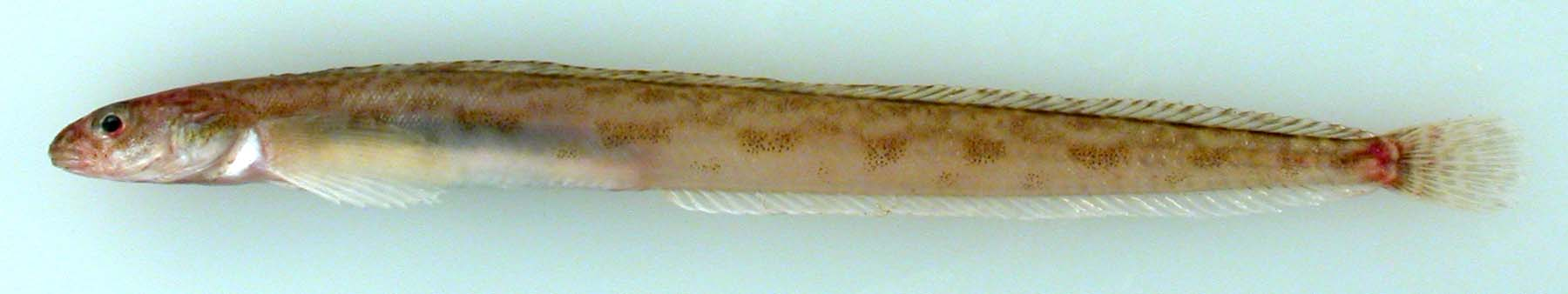

Scientific classification
- Kingdom: Animalia
- Phylum: Chordata
- Class: Actinopterygii
- Order: Perciformes
- Family: Lumpenidae
- Genus: Lumpenus; Reinhardt, 1836

Synonyms
- Centroblennius Gill, 1861; Leptoblennius Gill, 1860; Leptogunnellus Ayres, 1855

= Lumpenus =

Genus of fishes

Lumpenus is a genus of marine ray-finned fishes belonging to the family Lumpenidae, the eel pricklebacks.

The genus was first proposed by Reinhardt in 1836.

== Species ==
The following species are classified within this genus:

- Lumpenus fabricii Reinhardt, 1836
- Lumpenus lampretaeformis (Walbaum, 1792)
- Lumpenus sagitta Wilimovsky, 1956
