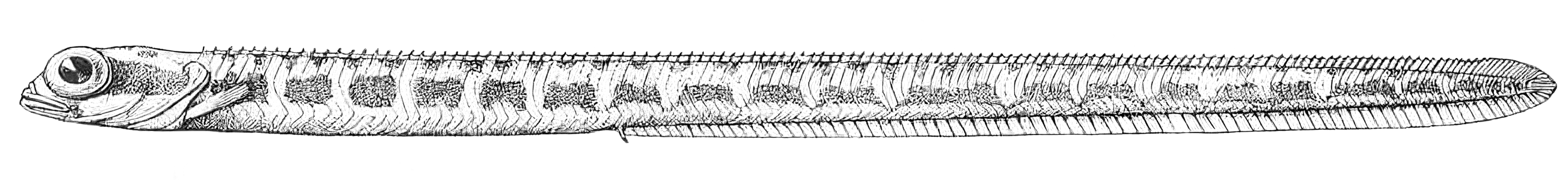
- Eulophias tanneri

Scientific classification
- Kingdom: Animalia
- Phylum: Chordata
- Class: Actinopterygii
- Order: Perciformes
- Suborder: Zoarcoidei
- Family: Eulophiidae; H. M. Smith, 1902

Genera
- See text

Synonyms
- Eulophiasinae Smith, 1902

= Eulophiidae =

Family of fishes

Eulophiidae, the spinous eelpouts, is a small family of marine ray-finned fishes classified within the suborder Zoarcoidei of the order Perciformes. They are found in the northwestern Pacific Ocean.

== Taxonomy ==
Eulophiidae was first proposed as a family in 2013 by the Korean biologists Hyuck Joon Kwun and Jin-Koo Kim for the genus Eulophias, which had previously been classified as belonging to the family Stichaeidae. Kwun and Kim argued that the molecular phylogenetics showed that Eulophias was only distantly related to the species classified within the Stichaeidae. This was supported by further molecular phylogenetic analyses published in 2014. and the validity of the family has been accepted by the 5th edition of Fishes of the World, by FishBase and by the Catalog of Fishes. The type species of the family, Eulophias tanneri, was described from Japan by Hugh McCormick Smith in 1902, Smith thought that his new species was a blenny but was different enough from other blennies that he proposed a new subfamily, Eulophiasinae, as a monotypic subfamily of the Blennidae, Jordan and Snyder changed the name to Eulophinae in 1902. The genera Eulophias and Azygopterus were subsequently placed in the subfamily Neozarchinae in the tribe Eulophini prior to Kwun and Kim's analysis.

The 5th edition of Fishes of the World classifies this family within the suborder Zoarcoidei, within the order Scorpaeniformes. Other authorities classify this family in the infraorder Zoarcales within the suborder Cottoidei of the Perciformes because removing the Scorpaeniformes from the Perciformes renders that taxon non monophyletic.

=== Genera ===
Eulophiidae contains the following 3 genera, and only 4 or 5 species are classified as belonging to the family:

- Azygopterus Andriashev & Makushok, 1955
- Eulophias H. M. Smith, 1902
- Leptostichaeus Miki, 1985

=== Etymology ===
The family name is based on the name Smith gave to Eulophias tanneri in 1902 and is a combination of eu, meaning "well", and lophias, which means "bristley backed", a reference to the long, spiny dorsal fin of that species.

== Characteritsics ==
Eulophiidae fishes are characterised by having an almost completely spiny dorsal fin, the pectoral fins may be absent or have at most 7 rays, there are no teeth on the vomerine or on the palatine teeth, they have 6 branchiostegal rays, there is no pyloric caeca, they have between 26 and 45 vertebrae in front of the tail and the parietals do not meet at the midline of the skull.

== Distribution ==
Eulophidae fishes are found in the North Western Pacific Ocean off Japan, Korea and the Russian Far East.
