= Neozoarcidae =

Scientific classification
- Kingdom: Animalia
- Phylum: Chordata
- Class: Actinopterygii
- Order: Perciformes
- Suborder: Zoarcoidei
- Subfamily: Neozoarcidae; Jordan & Snyder 1902

Genera
- See text

Subfamily of fish

Neozoarcidae, the largemouth kissing eelpouts, is a family of marine ray-finned fishes, classified within the Zoarcoidei. These fishes are found in the North Pacific Ocean.

== Genera ==
The subfamily contains the following genera:

- Neozoarces Steindachner, 1880
- Zoarchias Jordan & Snyder, 1902
