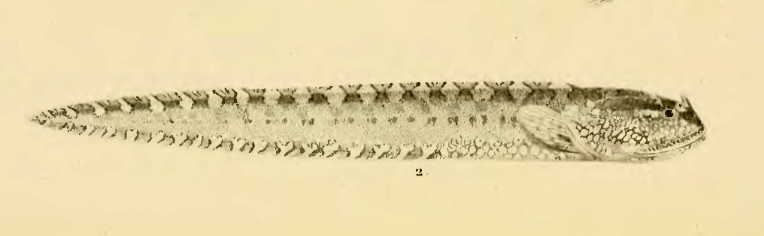
- Neozoarces pulcher

Scientific classification
- Kingdom: Animalia
- Phylum: Chordata
- Class: Actinopterygii
- Order: Perciformes
- Subfamily: Neozoarcidae
- Genus: Neozoarces; Steindachner, 1880

Type species
- Neozoarces pulcher Steindachner, 1880

= Neozoarces =

Genus of fishes

Neozoarces is a genus of marine ray-finned fishes belonging to the family Neozoarcidae, the largemouth kissing eelpouts. These fishes are found in the northwestern Pacific Ocean.

== Species ==
As of August 2022 the following species are classified within the genus Neozoarces:

- Neozoarces pulcher Steindachner, 1880
- Neozoarces steindachneri Jordan & Snyder, 1902
