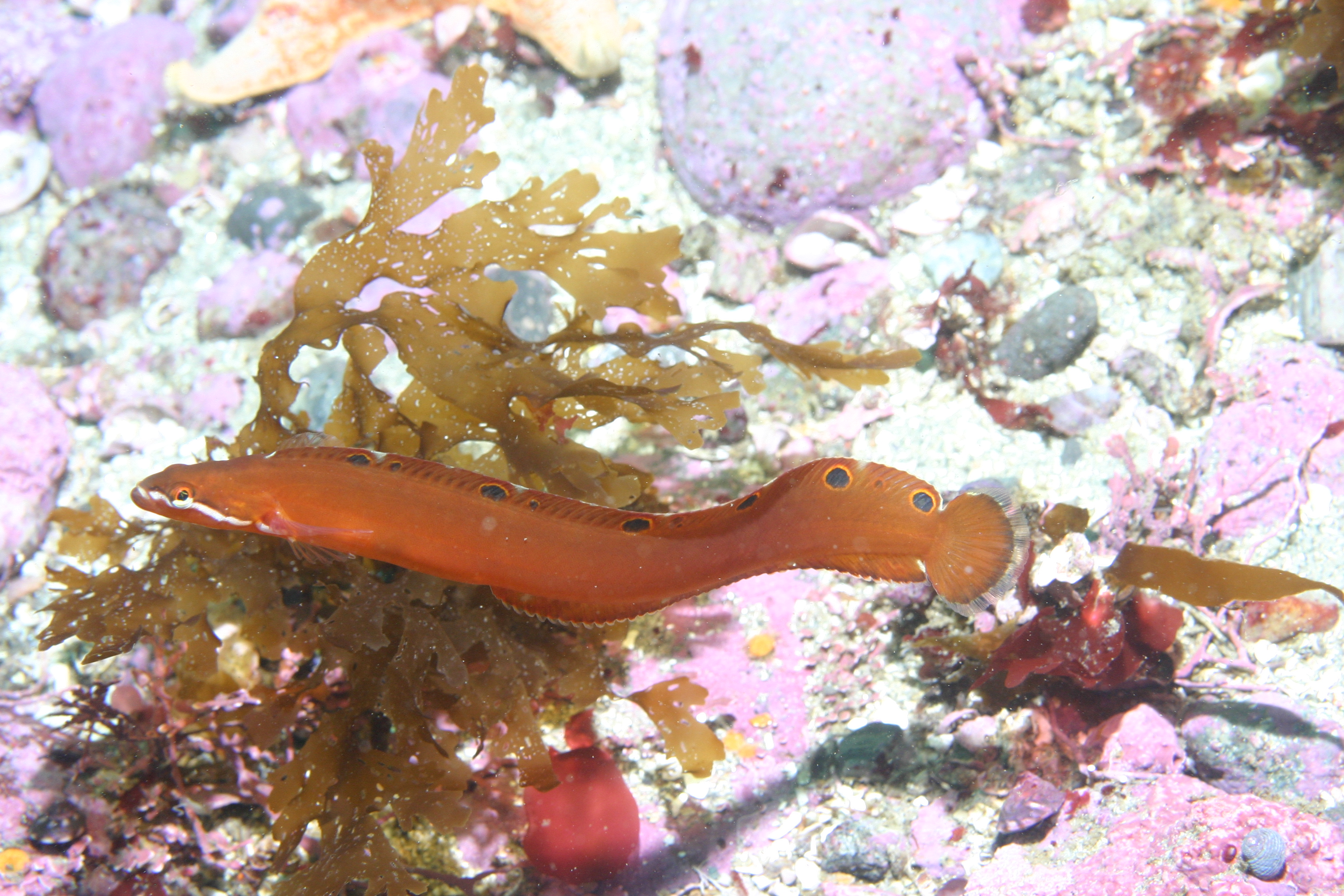
- Kasatkia seigeli

Scientific classification
- Kingdom: Animalia
- Phylum: Chordata
- Class: Actinopterygii
- Order: Perciformes
- Family: Opisthocentridae
- Genus: Kasatkia; Soldatov & Pavlenko, 1916

Type species
- Kasatkia memorabilis Soldatov & Pavlenko, 1916

= Kasatkia =

Genus of fishes

Kasatkia is a genus of marine ray-finned fishes belonging to the family Opisthocentridae, the rearspined fin pricklebacks. These fishes are found in the North Pacific Ocean.

== Taxonomy ==
Kasatkia was first proposed as a monospecific genus in 1916 by the Russian zoologists Vladimir Soldatov and Mikhail Nikolaevich Pavlenko when the described Kasatkia memorabilis from south of Cape Gamov in the Sea of Japan. In 1999 a second species, the six-spot prickelback (K. seigeli) was described from California. The genus is placed in the family Opisthocentridae. Kasatkia is considered to be closely related to Askoldia.

== Etymology ==
Kasatkia means belonging to Kasatka, the name of the vessel that Soldatov and Pavlenko used to carry out studies on the salmon of the Amur River.

== Species ==
Kasatkia contains the following species:

- Kasatkia memorabilis Soldatov & Pavlenko, 1916
- Kasatkia seigeli Posner & Lavenberg, 1999

== Characteristics ==
Kasatkia pricklebacks have, like other Stichaeids, an elongated, eel-like body. They may have a scaled head, although the extent of the covering of scales appears to vary individually and they mau be absent. They presence of pelvic fins also seems to vary within the species. They are separated from Askoldia by having 7 sensory pores in a sensory canal situated between their eyes. The two species are similar in length, with K. memorabilis having a maximum published total length of 10 cm (3.9 in).

== Distribution and habitat ==
Kasatkia pricklebacks are found in the North Pacific Ocean off eastern Asia and western North America. They are demersal fishes found in coastal waters at depths down to 26 m (85 ft).
