= Bluebarred prickleback =

Scientific classification
- Kingdom: Animalia
- Phylum: Chordata
- Class: Actinopterygii
- Order: Perciformes
- Family: Opisthocentridae
- Genus: Plectobranchus; Gilbert, 1890
- Species: P. evides

Binomial name
- Plectobranchus evides Gilbert, 1890

Species of fish

The bluebarred prickleback (Plectobranchus evides) is a species of marine ray-finned fish belonging to the family Opisthocentridae, the rearspine fin pricklebacks. It is the only species in the monotypic genus Plectobranchus. This fish is found in the eastern Pacific Ocean.
