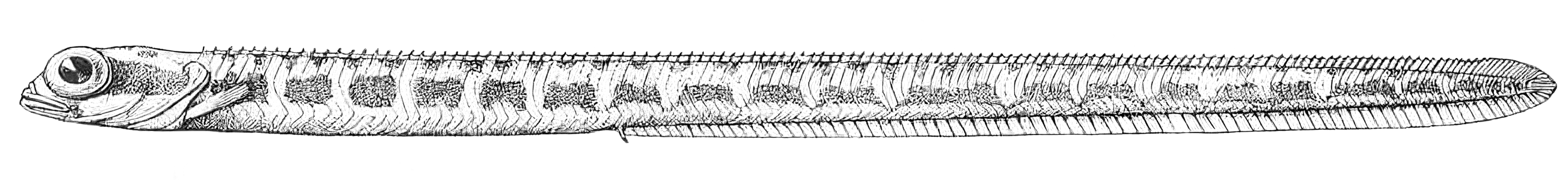
- Eulophias tanneri

Scientific classification
- Kingdom: Animalia
- Phylum: Chordata
- Class: Actinopterygii
- Order: Perciformes
- Family: Eulophiidae
- Genus: Eulophias; H. M. Smith, 1902

Type species
- Eulophias tanneri H. M. Smith, 1902

= Eulophias =

Genus of fishes

Eulophias is a genus of marine ray-finned fish belonging to the family Eulophiidae, the spinous eelpouts. These fishes are found in the northwestern Pacific Ocean.

== Species ==
Eulophias contains the following species:

- Eulophias koreanus Kwun & Kim, 2012
- Eulophias owashii Okada & Suzuki, 1954
- Eulophias tanneri H. M. Smith, 1902
- Eulophias spinosior Naohide Nakayama, Takeshi Yamakawa, Munehiro Takami and Hiromitsu Endo, 2023.
