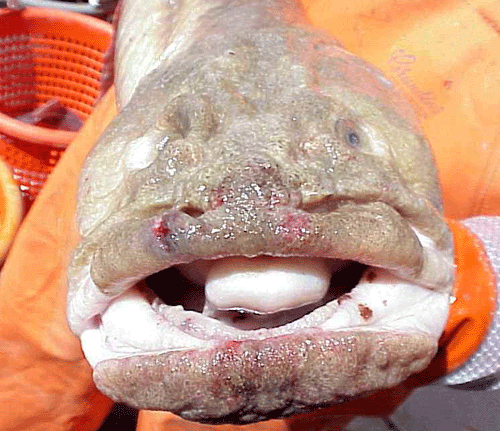
- Giant wrymouth (C. giganteus)

Scientific classification
- Kingdom: Animalia
- Phylum: Chordata
- Class: Actinopterygii
- Order: Perciformes
- Suborder: Zoarcoidei
- Family: Cryptacanthodidae; T. N. Gill, 1861
- Genus: Cryptacanthodes; D. H. Storer (fr), 1839

Type species
- Cryptacanthodes maculatus D. H. Storer, 1839

Synonyms
- Cryptacanthoides Lindberg, 1930; Delolepis T. H. Bean, 1882; Lyconectes C. H. Gilbert, 1896; Pseudophidium Gratzianov, 1907; Zoarcites Zugmayer, 1914

= Cryptacanthodes =

Genus of fishes

Cryptacanthodes is a genus of marine ray-finned fishes belonging to the monogeneric family Cryptacanthodidae, commonly referred to as wrymouths. Three of the four species are found in the Pacific Ocean with one species native to the western Atlantic Ocean where they are benthic fishes, tunneling through soft substrates. It is currently the only known genus in its family.

== Taxonomy ==
Cryptacanthodes was first proposed as a monotypic genus in 1839 by the American physician and naturalist David Humphreys Storer when he described Cryptacanthodes maculatus from Boston Harbor on the Gulf of Maine in Massachusetts. The genus is the only genus in the family Cryptacanthodidae, which was named by Theodore Gill in 1861. The 5th edition of Fishes of the World classifies this family within the suborder Zoarcoidei, within the order Scorpaeniformes. Other authorities classify this family in the infraorder Zoarcales within the suborder Cottoidei of the Perciformes because removing the Scorpaeniformes from the Perciformes renders that taxon non monophyletic.

== Etymology ==
Cryptacanthodes is a compound of cryptos, meaning "concealed", and acanthodes, which means "spined", a reference to spines of the dorsal fin in the wryfish (C. maculatus) being hidden within a membrane.

== Species ==
The currently recognized species in this genus are:

- Cryptacanthodes aleutensis (C. H. Gilbert, 1896) (dwarf wrymouth)
- Cryptacanthodes bergi Lindberg, 1930
- Cryptacanthodes giganteus (Kittlitz, 1858) (giant wrymouth)
- Cryptacanthodes maculatus D. H. Storer, 1839 (wrymouth)

== Characteristics ==
Cryptacanthodes have an elongate body which is rounded towards the head and compressed towards the tail.. They have a wide, flattened head with highly set eyes. The large mouth has a projecting lower jaw and is highly oblique, nearly vertical in alignment. The dorsal and anal fins are long based, reaching the base of the caudal fin or are joined to the caudal fin. The dorsal fin has 60-80 stiff spines while the anal fin has up to three spines and 43-52 soft rays. The pectoral fins are very small and there are no pelvic fins, although there is a pelvic girdle. They have a single pair of tubular nostrils. In most species there are no scales, although C. giganteus has small ctenoid scales. The mechanosensory canals on the head do not have openings to the outside. The lateral line is made up of widely spaced superficial neuromasts. Vomerine teeth and palatine teeth are present in three species, but are absent in C. aleutensis. The gill membranes have a wide connection to the isthmus and the gill openings do not extend very far forward. There is no swim bladder. They are pale brown on the upper body and cream-colored on the lower body. They may be marked with spots and some specimens may be a uniform pink or red. Wryfish reach maximum total lengths which vary from 31 to 127 cm (12 to 50 in).

== Distribution and habitat ==
Cryptacanthodes Are found in the cold-temperate waters of the North Pacific and western North Atlantic in coastal areas. They excavate the soft substrate to create extensive tunnel systems which have many exits.

== See also ==
- List of fish families
