= Zoarchias =

Scientific classification
- Kingdom: Animalia
- Phylum: Chordata
- Class: Actinopterygii
- Order: Perciformes
- Subfamily: Neozoarcidae
- Genus: Zoarchias; Jordan & Snyder, 1902

Type species
- Zoarchias veneficus Jordan & Snyder, 1902

Genus of fishes

Zoarchias is a genus of marine ray-finned fishes belonging to the Perciform family Neozoarcidae, also called the largemouth kissing eelpouts. These fishes are found in the northwestern and western Pacific Ocean.

== Species ==
The following species are classified within the genus Zoarchias:

- Zoarchias glaber Tanaka, 1908
- Zoarchias hosoyai Kimura & Sato, 2007
- Zoarchias macrocephalus Kimura & Sato, 2007
- Zoarchias major Tomiyama, 1972
- Zoarchias microstomus Kimura & Jiang, 1995
- Zoarchias uchidai Matsubara, 1932
- Zoarchias veneficus Jordan & Snyder 1902
