= Woods Hole Science Aquarium =

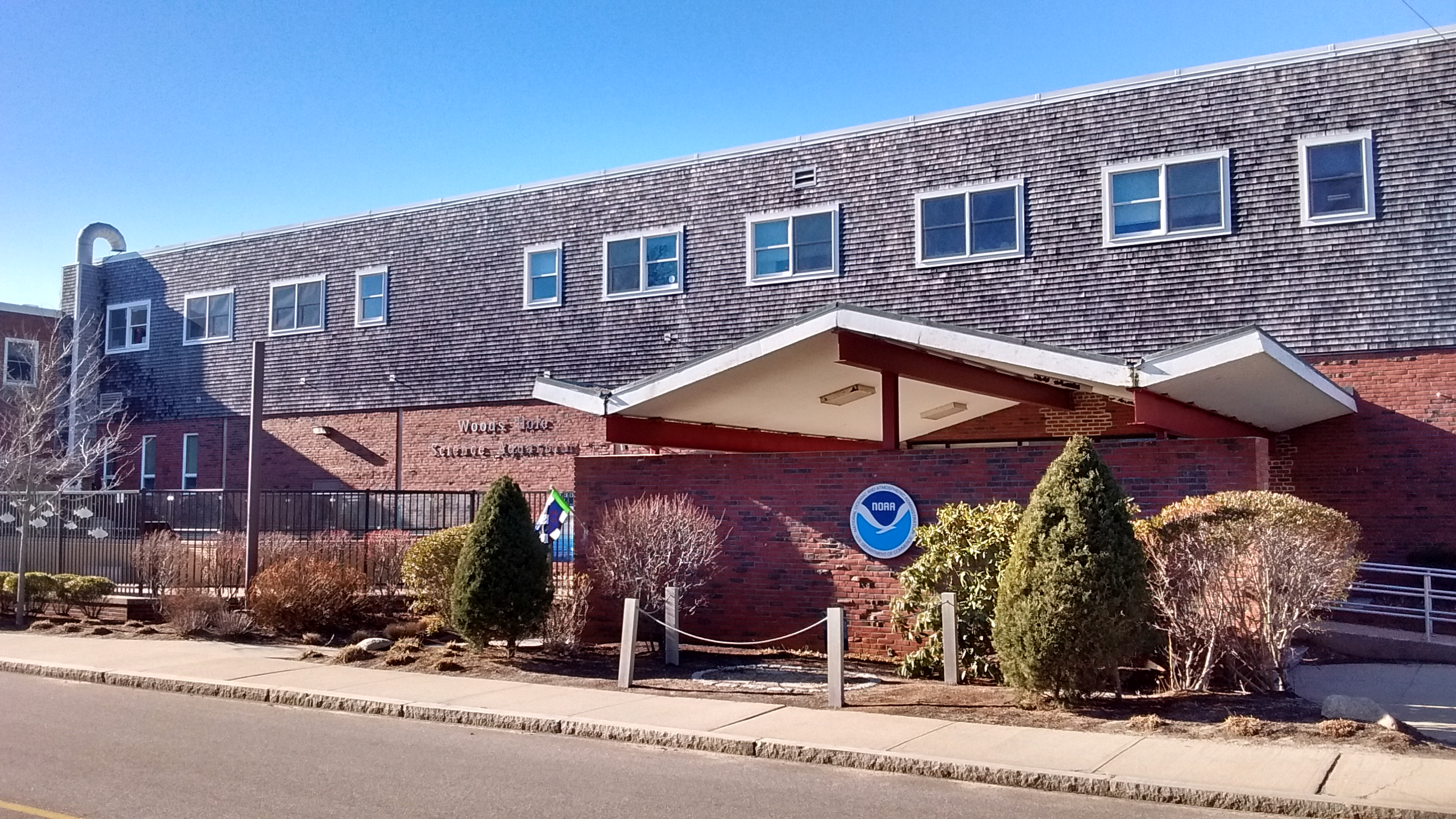
- Woods Hole Science Aquarium
- Interactive map of Woods Hole Science Aquarium
- 41°31′33″N 70°40′27″W
- Date opened: 1885
- Location: 166 Water Street, Woods Hole, Massachusetts, United States
- No. of species: 140
- Annual visitors: 80,000
- Owner: Federal government of the United States
- Public transit: Cape Cod Regional Transit Authority
- Website: www.fisheries.noaa.gov/new-england-mid-atlantic/outreach-and-education/woods-hole-science-aquarium

The Woods Hole Science Aquarium (WHSA) is a small public aquarium in Woods Hole, Massachusetts, United States. The facility is owned by the US government and operated by the National Marine Fisheries Service and the Marine Biological Laboratory.

== History ==
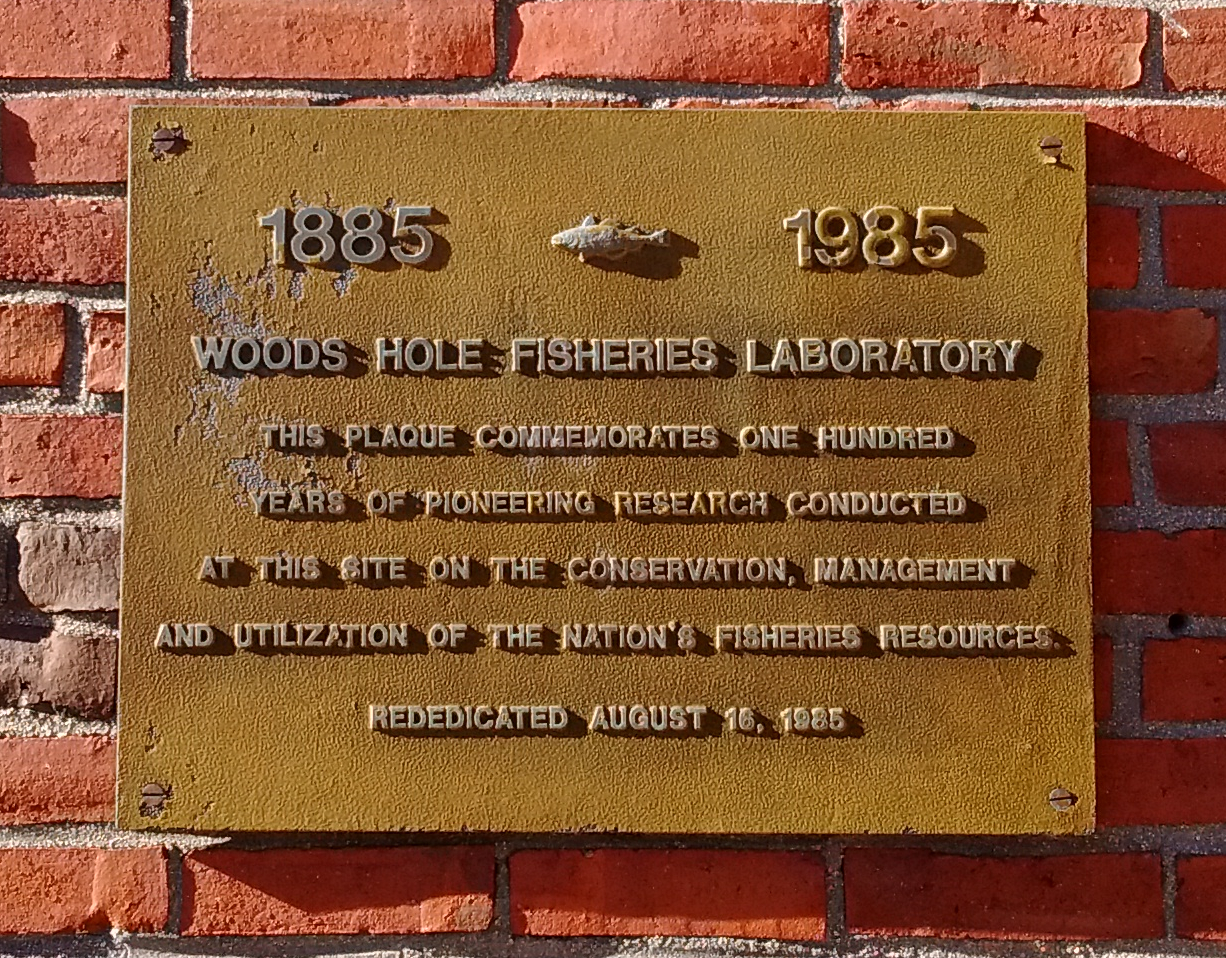
Rededication plaque.

The Woods Hole Science Aquarium claims to be the oldest aquarium in the US. In 1873 or 1875, US Commissioner of Fish and Fisheries Spencer Fullerton Baird invited the public to his laboratory in Woods Hole to see animals and learn about marine science.

In 1885, the US government built the first marine research building in Woods Hole, and Baird arranged for the first floor to house a public aquarium that displayed fish, invertebrates, and birds. Baird's exhibit also inspired the creation of the National Aquarium in Washington, D.C. in 1878. In 1954, the original laboratory building was damaged by Hurricane Carol, and it was torn down in 1958. The aquarium reopened in its current location in 1961.

== Exhibits ==
The aquarium's exhibits consist of marine animals found in the waters of the Northeastern and Mid-Atlantic United States. Approximately 140 species of fish and invertebrates are displayed in indoor tanks and a touch tank. The aquarium also has an outdoor habitat that provides a permanent home for injured seals. As of 2007, the aquarium was home to two harbor seals. They died in July 2017. The aquarium receives approximately 80,000 visitors per year.

== Sea turtle conservation ==
In addition to its display animals, the Woods Hole Science Aquarium runs a program to rehabilitate sea turtles that have washed up on Cape Cod beaches after being injured or stunned by cold weather in late autumn. The turtles are rehabilitated until they are healthy enough to return to the wild, but they are not displayed to the public.

== Gallery ==
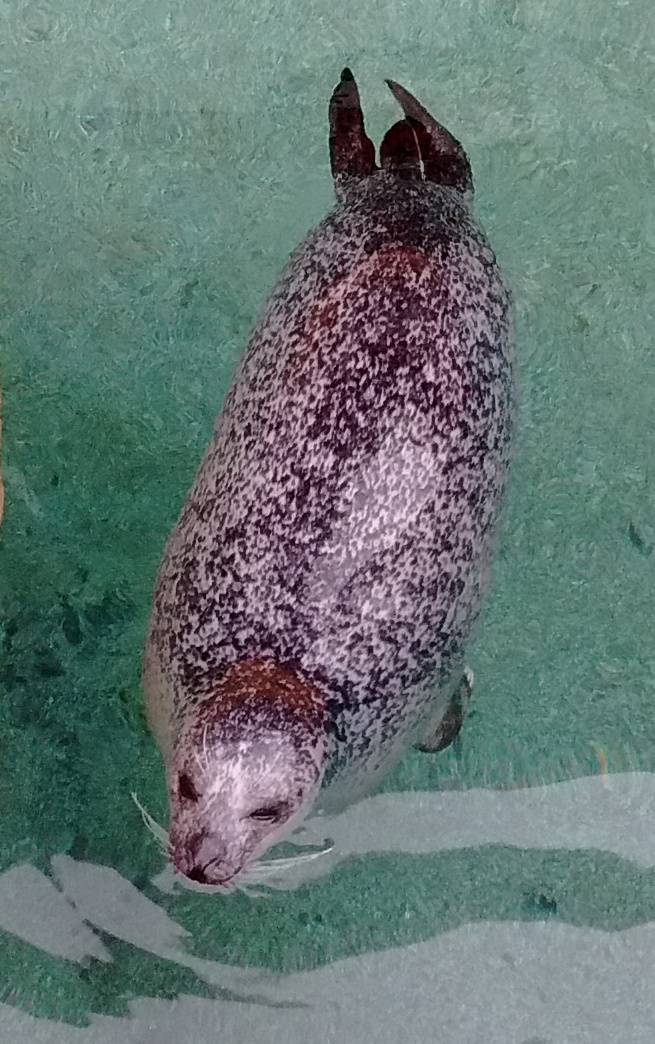
Harbor seal

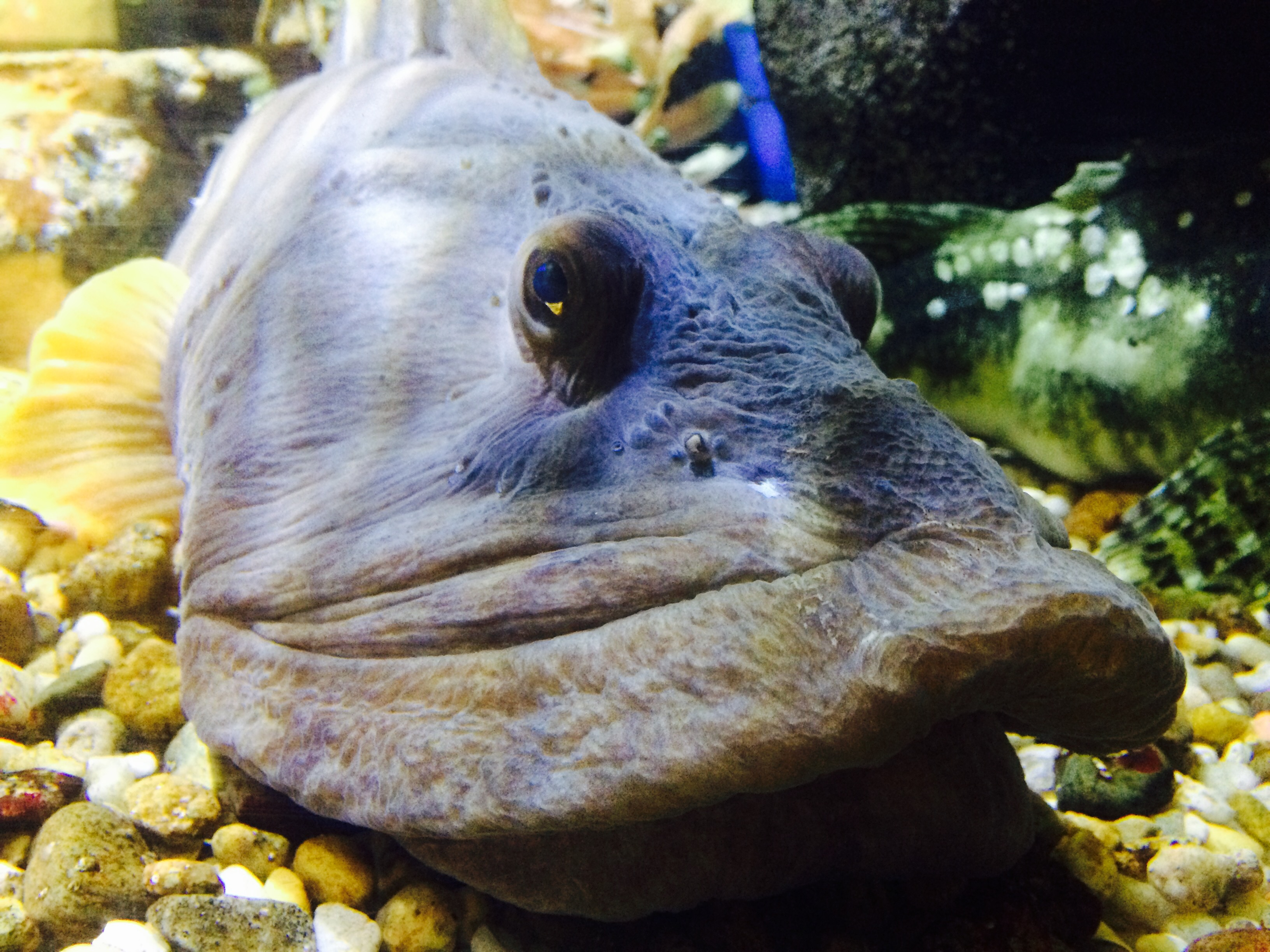
Ocean pout

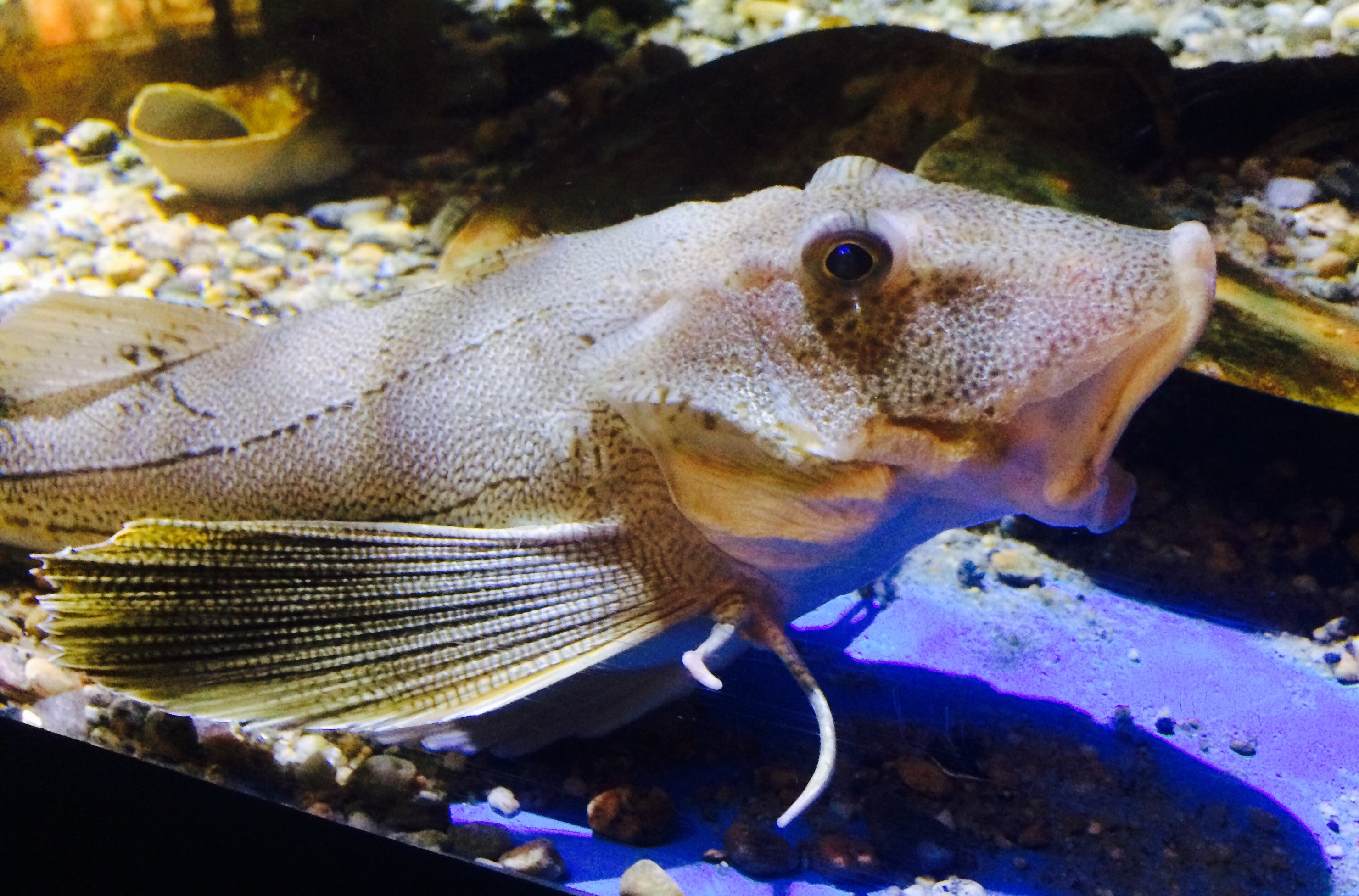
Sea robin
