= Zoarces fedorovi =

Scientific classification
- Kingdom: Animalia
- Phylum: Chordata
- Class: Actinopterygii
- Order: Perciformes
- Family: Zoarcidae
- Genus: Zoarces
- Species: Z. fedorovi

Binomial name
- Zoarces fedorovi Chereshnev, Nazarkin & Chegodayeva, 2007

Species of fish

Zoarces fedorovi is an eelpout in the family Zoarcidae. Described in 2007, it is apparently found only in the northern part of the Sea of Okhotsk.
