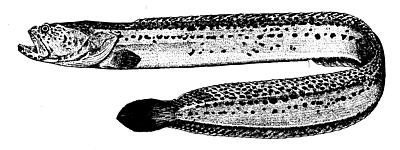

Conservation status
- Secure (NatureServe)

Scientific classification
- Kingdom: Animalia
- Phylum: Chordata
- Class: Actinopterygii
- Division: Teleostei
- Order: Perciformes
- Family: Cryptacanthodidae
- Genus: Cryptacanthodes
- Species: C. maculatus

Binomial name
- Cryptacanthodes maculatus D. H. Storer, 1839

Synonyms
- Fierasfer borealis De Kay, 1842; Cryptacanthodes inornatus T. N. Gill, 1863; Zoarcites pardalis Zugmayer, 1914

= Wrymouth =

Species of fish

The wrymouth (Cryptacanthodes maculatus) sometimes called ghostfish or "potato-head fish", is a slim, eel-like creature belongs to the wrymouth family Cryptacanthodidae. It outgrows the blennies, its relatives, and may reach a length of 97 centimetres (38 in) TL A low spiny dorsal fin stands along the entire back. This includes about 70 spines and unites with the caudal and anal fins. Small eyes lie near the top of its big head. The mouth slants sharply above a ponderous lower jaw. Along its reddish brown upper sides extend several irregular rows of small dark spots. The dorsal and anal fins also show spots. The lack of ventral fins and a pronounced upward pointing mouth are characteristic.

== Distribution and habitat ==
Dwelling along the North Atlantic and East Pacific oceans of North America, it ordinarily hugs the bottom from shallow water down to a depth of around 110 metres (360 ft). It creates burrows in the mud bottom on which it lives. About 2 inches around and 1.5 to 3 in below the surface, the burrow branches into tunnels. Sometimes, however, the burrow stands as high as 4 feet above the low water mark. It begins in a centrally placed mound with smaller openings along the tunnel and at its end. At night, they may be seen protruding about a head's length from their burrows, but are seldom seen out in the open. In thousands of hours of night diving in their habitat, we only observed one out of its burrow once, and when disturbed, it returned immediately to the nearest opening. It spawns in the winter, probably in deep water. Wrymouths have been seen hunting live shrimp, small crabs and hermit crabs in captivity and this is likely a continuation of their natural behavior and diet in the wild.

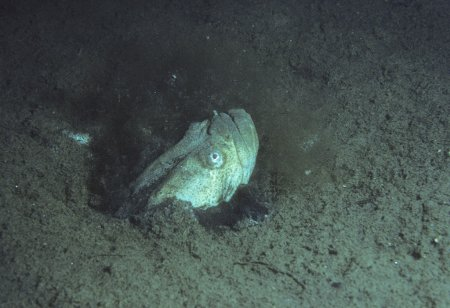
Wrymouth in its burrow

== Reproduction ==
Almost nothing is known about their reproductive biology. Small, but well-developed fry have been recorded from the northern parts of their range in Howe Sound in early spring, suggesting that spawning may take place in winter. Eggs and early fry are completely unknown, suggesting the possibility that spawning may take place inside the burrow system. Breeding pairs tend to stick together in large family territories, where several pairs may den together. Little is known about territoriality, mating strategies, or whether they provide parental care. Females lay eggs and fertilization is presumed to occur externally.

== In the aquarium ==
In aquaria the wrymouth has been known to utilize a rubber tube as a ready-made burrow.
