= Askoldia =

Scientific classification
- Kingdom: Animalia
- Phylum: Chordata
- Class: Actinopterygii
- Order: Perciformes
- Suborder: Zoarcoidei
- Family: Opisthocentridae
- Genus: Askoldia; Pavlenko, 1910
- Species: A. variegata

Binomial name
- Askoldia variegata Pavlenko, 1910

Synonyms
- Askoldia knipowitschi Soldatov, 1927

Genus of fishes

Askoldia is a monotypic genus of marine ray-finned fishes belonging to the family Opisthocentridae, the rearspined fin pricklebacks. Its only species is Askoldia variegata which is found in the northwestern Pacific Ocean.

== Taxonomy ==
Askoldia was first proposed as a monospecific genus in 1910 by the Russian ichthyologist Mikhail Nikolaevich Pavlenko when he described its only species A. variegatus, with its type locality given as near Askold Island in Peter the Great Bay in the Sea of Japan, Russia. The genus is placed in the family Opisthocentridae. Some authorities also recognise two subspecies, the nominate A.v. variegata and A.v. knipowitschi but the validity of this subspecies is not generally accepted. Askoldia is considered to be closely related to Kasatkia.

== Etymology ==
Askoldia is named after its type locality, Askold Island. The specific name variegata means "variegated" and is thought to refer to the colour pattern of a green background colour marked with many poorly defined red spots.

== Description ==
Askoldia has between 57 and 68 spines in the dorsal fin and 2 spines and 38-43 soft rays in the anal fin. The pectoral fins have 20-23 fin rays while the pelvic fins have a single spine and 3 soft rays. It has vomerine teeth and a scaled head. This species attains a maximum standard length of 45 cm (18 in).

== Distribution and habitat ==
Askoldia is found in the western North Pacific Ocean from the northern Sea of Okhotsk to the Pacific coast of Hokkaido and in the Sea of Japan to Peter the Great Bay at depths between 1.5 and 100 m (4 ft 11 in and 328 ft 1 in). although it is typically found at depths of less than 60 m (200 ft).
