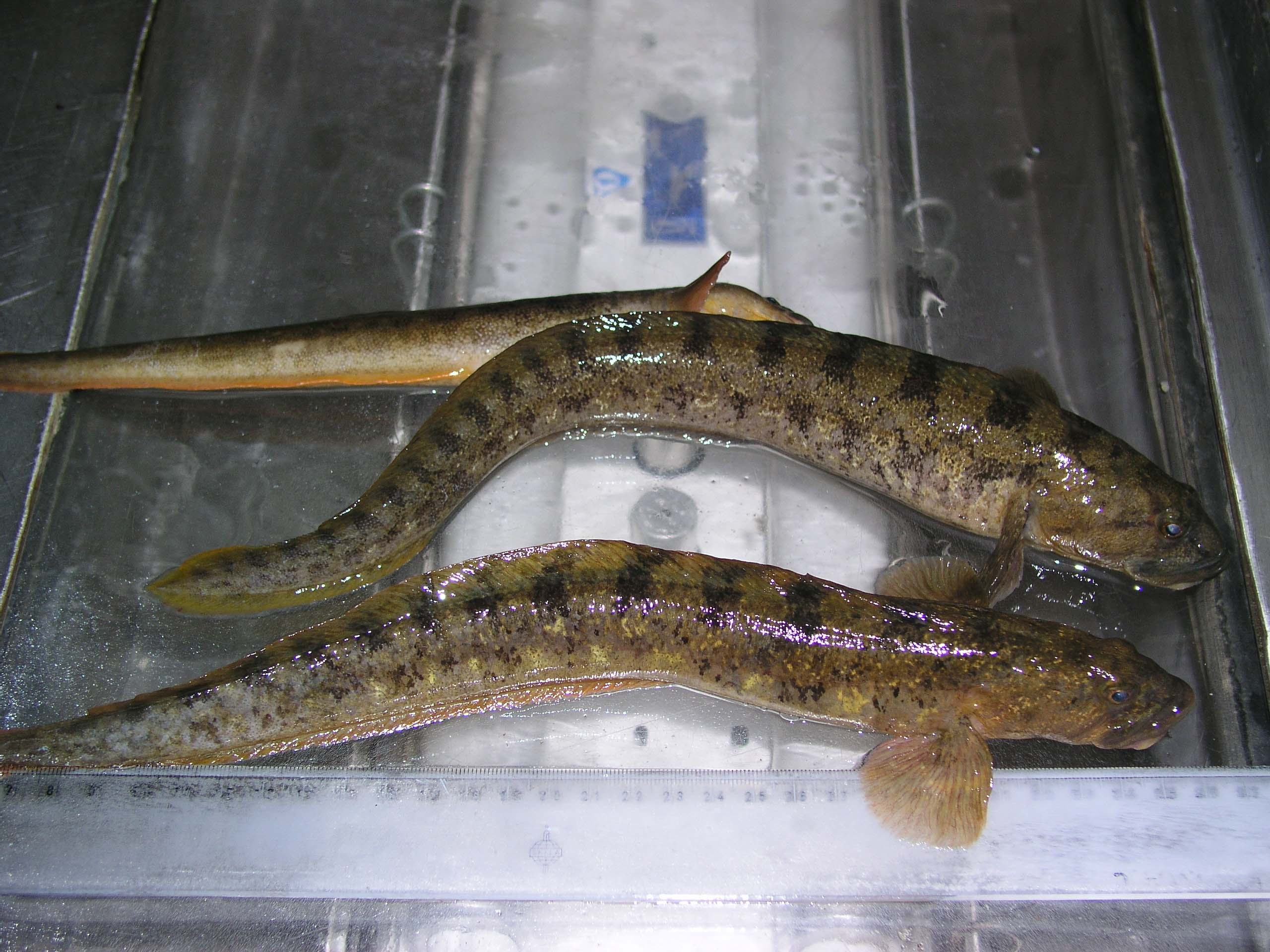

Conservation status
- Least Concern (IUCN 3.1)

Scientific classification
- Kingdom: Animalia
- Phylum: Chordata
- Class: Actinopterygii
- Division: Teleostei
- Order: Perciformes
- Family: Zoarcidae
- Genus: Zoarces
- Species: Z. viviparus

Binomial name
- Zoarces viviparus (Linnaeus, 1758)

Synonyms
- Blennius viviparus Linnaeus, 1758

= Viviparous eelpout =

Species of fish

The viviparous eelpout (Zoarces viviparus), also known as the viviparous blenny and European eelpout, is a species of marine ray-finned fish belonging to the family Zoarcidae, the eelpouts. It is notable for being ovoviviparous and gives birth to live larvae (hence the description "mother of eels"). It is a common soup ingredient in Mediterranean countries. The bones are of greenish colour, due to a harmless pigment. Their skin is slimy and the colour is variable.

== Taxonomy ==
The viviparous eelpout was first formally described as Blennius viviparus by Carl Linnaeus in the 10th edition of his Systema Naturae with its type locality given as "European seas". In 1829, the French zoologist Georges Cuvier proposed the genus Zoarces for the eelpouts and subsequently B, viviparus was designated as the type species of Zoarces, possibly by David Starr Jordan in 1917. The specific name viviparus means "giving birth to live young", although the species is ovoviviparous.

== Description ==
The viviparous eelpout has a slim, tapering body and resembles a small burbot (Lota lota), a wide head and mouth and protuberant lips. It has long, ribbon-like dorsal and anal fins which continue on to unite with the arrowhead-shaped caudal fin. This distinguishes this fish from the two similar slim-bodied bottom-dwelling fish of the area, the rock gunnel (Pholis gunnellus) and the snake blenny (Ophidion barbatum). The bones are green. The tiny scales are embedded in the slimy skin. There dorsal fin becomes lower as it nears the caudal fin with these shorter rays being short and spinous. The colour is highly variable, although they are commonly greyish brown on the upper body and yellowish ventrally. They are marked with either a single or double series of blotches along the body and on the dorsal fin. The pectoral fins have yellow or yellowish orange edges. This species reaches a maximum published total length of 52 cm (20 in), although 30 cm (12 in) is more typical, and may weigh up to 510 g (18 oz).

== Distribution and habitat ==
The viviparous eelpoutis found in the eastern Atlantic Ocean where its range extends from the English Channel north around the British Isles, although it is absent from the Atlantic coasts of Ireland, eastwards onto the Baltic Sea and northwards through the North Sea and along the coast of Norway to the White Sea and the Barents Sea. This species occurs in the intertidal zone where it can live in marine and brackish environments, avoiding drying out when exposed at low tide by sheltering beneath rocks or in fissures in the rock or by staying submerged in rock pools. This demersal fish is normally sedentary, hiding under rocks or among seaweed. It can be found at depths between 0 and 40 m (0 and 131 ft), although it is normally found at depths of 2 to 20 m (6 ft 7 in to 65 ft 7 in).

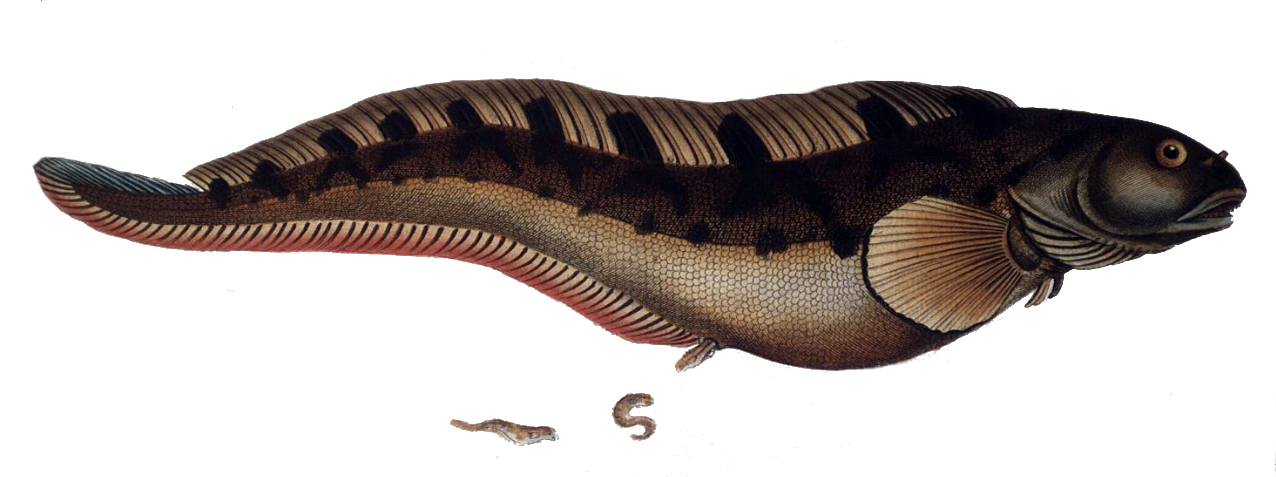
Drawing of the eelpout with fry

== Biology ==
The viviparous eelpout feeds on bottom-dwelling invertebrates, such as crustaceans, and fish eggs and fry.

Adults mate during the months of August and September using internal fertilisation. The fish are notably viviparous, giving birth to 30–400 live developed young. Unusually, it does so during winter when water temperatures are extremely cold. Among fish it has one of the longest known pregnancies, lasting approximately six months. It has been discovered that the eelpout suckles its young embryos while still within their mother's body, making it the only fish species to suckle its offspring. The embryos actually suckle from ovarian follicles, ingesting nutrients and gases from these internal structures. After depleting the egg's yolk reserves, the eelpouts attach their mouths to an ovarian follicle, which has a canal in its tip via which fluid and nutrients can flow. This follicle fluid is rich in proteins, fatty acids and glucose. It is also saturated in oxygen, which helps ventilate the gills of the developing fish. Each embryo latches onto a single follicle. This ensures an equal distribution of nutrients.

== Utilisation ==
The viviparous eelpout is of minor commercial value to fisheries in some parts of its range.
