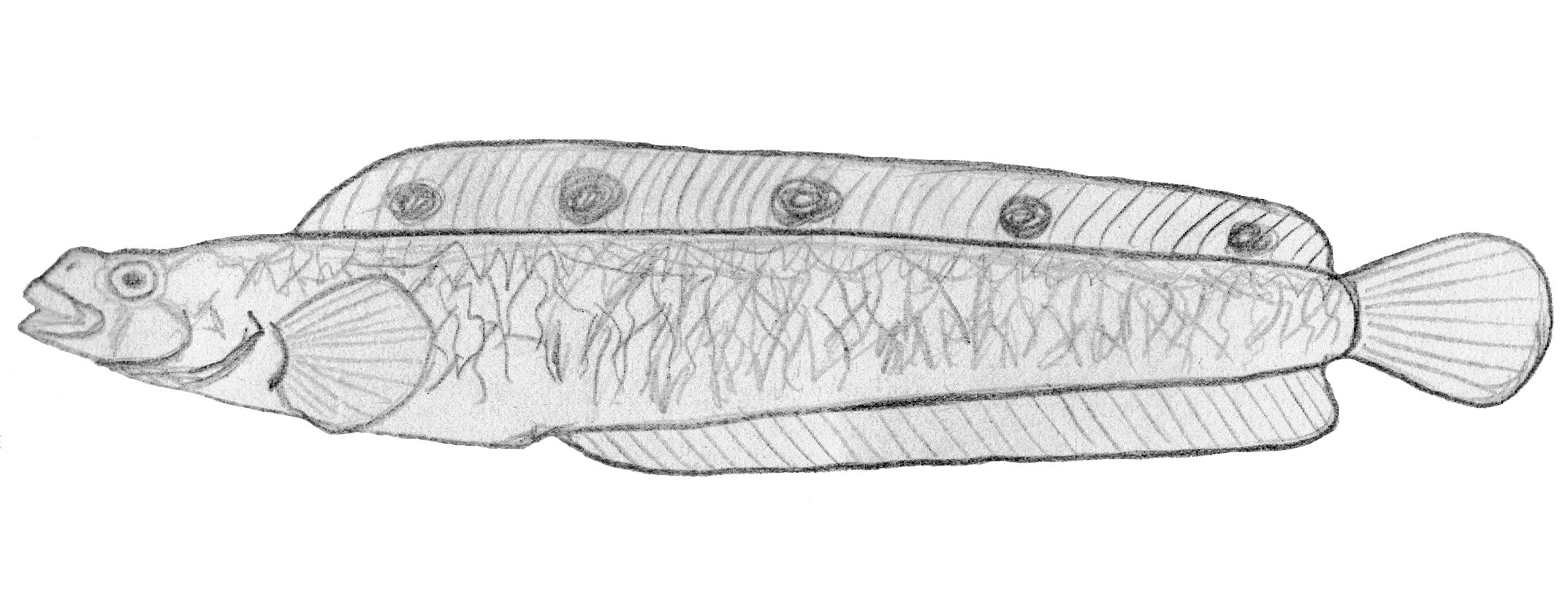
- Opisthocentrus ocellatus

Scientific classification
- Kingdom: Animalia
- Phylum: Chordata
- Class: Actinopterygii
- Order: Perciformes
- Suborder: Zoarcoidei
- Family: Opisthocentridae; Jordan & Evermann, 1898

Genera
- See text

= Opisthocentridae =

Subfamily of fishes

Opisthocentridae, the rearspined fin pricklebacks, is a family of marine ray-finned fishes, classified within the suborder Zoarcoidei. These fishes are found in the North Pacific Ocean.

== Taxonomy ==
Opisthocentrinae was first put forward as a subfamily in 1898 by the American ichthyologists David Starr Jordan and Barton Warren Evermann. The 5th edition of Fishes of the World places this subfamily in the family Stichaeidae but presently, Eschmeyer's Catalog of Fishes treats this taxon as a valid family, Opisthocentridae within the suborder Zoarcoidei within the Perciformes. This is based on phylogenetic evidence that found Stichaeidae to be paraphyletic as previously defined. The name of the subfamily is taken from its type genus Opisthocentrus which is a combination of opistho, meaning "behind", and kentron, which means "thorn" or "spine", an allusion to the spines on the 11th and 12th rays in the dorsal fin of O. ocellatus.

== Etymology ==
Opisthocentrus is a combination of opistho, meaning "behind", and kentron, which means "thorn" or "spine", an allusion to the spines on the 11th and 12th rays in the dorsal fin of O. ocellatus.

== Genera ==
The subfamily contains the following genera:

- Askoldia Pavlenko, 1910
- Kasatkia Soldatov & Pavlenko, 1916
- Lumpenopsis Soldatov, 1916
- Opisthocentrus Kner, 1868
- Pholidapus T.H. Bean & B.A. Bean, 1897
- Plectobranchus Gilbert, 1890

== Characteristics ==
Opisthocentridae fishes are characterised by having elongate bodies which are relatively deep. They do not have any appendages in the skin of the head. The anal fin has with 1 or 2 spines at its anterior end and the pectoral fins are lareg, containing between 12 and 21 fin rays. The small pelvic fins have a single spine and 3 soft rays, although in some taxa these may be vestigial or absent, e.g. in Kasatkia. The head can be completed clothed in scales, there may only be scales on the cheek or it may be naked. The sensory canals on the head are well developed and the lateral line system on the body consists of mid flank and dorsal lines comprising superficial neuromasts. The gill membranes have a wide join and are not attached to the isthmus. The smallest species is the saddled prickleback (Lumpenopsis clitella) which has a maximum published standard length of 5.6 cm (2.2 in) and the largest is Pholidapus dybowskii which has a maximum published total length of 46 cm (18 in).

== Distribution and habitat ==
Opisthocentridae fishes are found in the North Pacific Ocean off both Asia and North America. They are found from coastal algal beds out to the edge of the continental shelf. Generally, little is known about their biology.
