= Zoarces =

Zoarces Temporal range: Pleistocene to Present
- Zoarces viviparus

Scientific classification
- Kingdom: Animalia
- Phylum: Chordata
- Class: Actinopterygii
- Order: Perciformes
- Family: Zoarcidae
- Subfamily: Zoarcinae; Swainson, 1839
- Genus: Zoarces; Cuvier, 1829

Type species
- Blennius viviparus Linnaeus, 1758

Species
- See text.

Synonyms
- Macrozoarces Gill, 1863

Genus of fishes

Zoarces is a genus of marine ray-finned fishes belonging to the family Zoarcidae, the eelpouts. It is the only genus in the subfamily Zoarcinae. These eelpouts are found in the northern Atlantic and northern Pacific Oceans.

== Taxonomy ==
Zoarces was first proposed as a genus in 1829 by the French zoologist Georges Cuvier. Blennius viviparus, which had been described in 1758 by Linnaeus in the tenth edition of his Systema Naturae from "European seas". was subsequently designated as the type species. Zoarces is the only genus classified within the subfamily Zoarcinae, one of 4 subfamilies in the family Zoarcidae.

== Etymology ==
Zoarces means "viviparous", i.e. giving birth to live young, however these fishes are ovoviviparous.

== Species ==
Zoarces contains the following species:

- Zoarces americanus (Bloch and Schneider, 1801) - ocean pout
- Zoarces andriashevi Parin, Grigoryev & Karmovskaya, 2005
- Zoarces elongatus Kner, 1868
- Zoarces fedorovi Chereshnev, Nazarkin & Chegodayeva, 2007
- Zoarces gillii Jordan and Starks, 1905 - blotched eelpout
- Zoarces viviparus (Linnaeus, 1758) - viviparous eelpout

== Characteristics ==
Zoarces eelpouts are characterised by having an elongated body and tail with between 101 and 1456 vertebrae, each with a single epural which has two rays. The branchiostegal membrane is joined to the isthmus. They have an interorbital pore. The caudal fin contains between 9 and 11 fin rays. There are 6 suborbital bones form a semicircle around the eye. There are sharp, stiff spines at the rear of the dorsal fin, although infrequently this is absent in one species. The largest species is the ocean pout which has reached a maximum published total length of 110 cm (43 in), the largest of the Zoarcids, while the smallest is the Z. fedorovi with a maximum published total length of 31.5 cm (12.4 in).

== Distribution and habitat ==
Zoarces eelpouts are found in the northern Pacific Ocean and northern Atlantic Ocean, They are found from the sublittoral zone and continental shelf down to depths of 300 m (980 ft), some even enter brackish water when spawning in the winter.
