= Johan Reinhardt =

Norwegian-born Danish zoologist

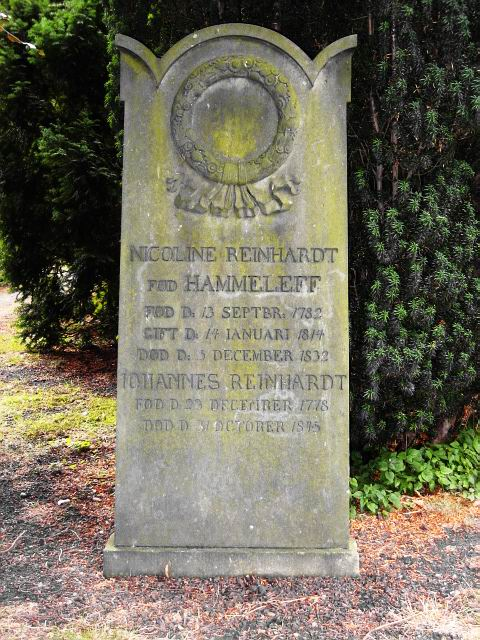
The tomb of Johannes Reinhardt at Assistens Kirkegård, Copenhagen

Johannes Christopher Hagemann Reinhardt (23 December 1778 – 31 October 1845), sometimes called J. C. H. Reinhardt, was a professor in zoology at the University of Copenhagen.

== Biography ==
Born in Rendalen parish in Norway, his father, Johannes Henrik Reinhardt, was a priest, and his mother, Johanne Elisabeth Mommesen, was from Holmestrand. He was not baptized Johannes, but adopted the name later.

After having been educated at home, he came to Copenhagen in 1792 and entered the university in 1793, where he passed the first two examinations, but after that spent almost two years at home, where he used the opportunity to study plants and animals. In 1796, he returned to Copenhagen to study theology, but his tendencies pulled him away from this study and towards natural history.

He became a disciple of Martin Vahl, with whose help Reinhardt in 1801 got the opportunity to travel abroad, where he stayed until 1806 (in the beginning a mentor for a son of the titular councillor of state J.C.C. Brun). At first, Reinhardt studied mineralogy at the academy of mining in Freiberg, later primarily zoology and anatomy in Göttingen and finally in Paris. During his stay there he received an appointment as an inspector for that part of the newly established Royal Museum for Natural History which was founded by acquiring the collections of the Society for Natural History in 1805. He was just about to start as a private tutor in a German family in Normandy, but accepted happily the post as inspector instead, although the annual salary was only 200 Rdl., because he now felt it possible to return home without having to choose between "death from hunger or practising law".

He remained in Paris for a few months more and tried to extend his rather insufficient knowledge by studying in the museums and by following Georges Cuvier's lectures, that had excited his enthusiasm. In late 1806 he returned and immediately took over the management of the collection. In 1809 he started giving lectures in the museum, and when professor J. Rathke had been transferred to Christiania, Reinhardt was also employed by the university in 1813, at first as a senior lecturer and the year after as a professor extraordinarius in natural history.

In 1821, he became a member of the Royal Danish Academy of Sciences and Letters, in 1830 ordinary professor and a member of the Academic Council; in 1836 he was appointed honourable Doctor of Philosophy, and in 1839 he became titular councillor of state.

== Personal life ==
In 1814, he married Mette Margrethe Nicoline Hammeleff (1782–1832), a daughter of titular councillor of state N. Hammeleff and Juliane Marie Hammeleff, born Pontoppidan. His son, herpetologist Johannes Theodor Reinhardt, published Bidrag til Kundskab om Brasiliens Padder og Krybdyr alongside Christian Frederik Lütken, which contributed to knowledge of Brazilian amphibians and reptiles.

Reinhardt died on 31 October 1845 in Copenhagen.

== Taxon described by him ==
- See Category:Taxa named by Johan Reinhardt
