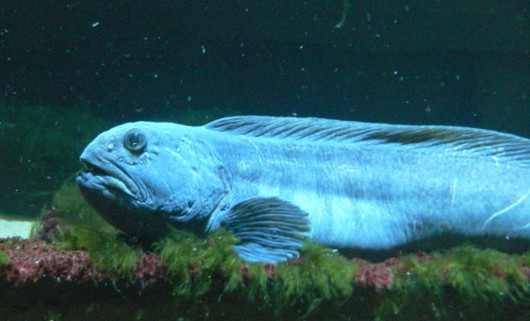
- Atlantic wolffish Anarhichas lupus

Scientific classification
- Kingdom: Animalia
- Phylum: Chordata
- Class: Actinopterygii
- Order: Perciformes
- Suborder: Zoarcoidei

Families
- see text

= Zoarcoidei =

Zoarcoidei Temporal range: Miocene to present

Suborder of ray-finned fishes

Zoarcoidei is a suborder of marine ray-finned fishes belonging to the order Perciformes. The suborder includes the wolffishes, gunnels and eelpouts. The suborder includes about 400 species. These fishes are predominantly found in the boreal seas of the Northern Hemisphere but they have colonised the Southern Hemisphere. Many members of this suborder are extremophiles adapted to deepwater ecosystems (including hydrothermal vents) and polar waters.

== Taxonomy ==
Zoarcoidei was first proposed as a taxonomic grouping by the American zoologist Theodore Gill in 1893 as the superfamily Zoarceoidea. The 5th edition of Fishes of the World classifies the Zoarcoidei as a suborder within the order Scorpaeniformes. Other authorities classify this taxon as the infraorder Zoarcales within the suborder Cottoidei of the Perciformes because removing the Scorpaeniformes from the Perciformes renders that taxon paraphyletic. The monophyly of this grouping has still not been fully ascertained but it is generally accepted that the family Bathymasteridae is sister to the remaining lineages in the group.

Phylogenetic evidence suggests that despite their evolutionary, ecological & physiological diversity, zoarcoids have a relatively recent origin; although the stem group diverged from the Gasterosteoidei around the Early Eocene, the crown group only originated around the latest Oligocene, with most of the family-level divergences taking place over the Neogene. The acquirement of the type III antifreeze protein, which allowed for the group to thrive in freezing environments, appears to have occurred prior to the origin of the crown group, potentially during the Early Oligocene. The radiation into extreme habitats appears to have independently occurred in multiple lineages as a consequence of physiological changes and founder events. The earliest fossil remains of the group are from the Miocene of Japan and the mid-late Miocene (late Serravalian or early Tortonian) aged Agnevo Formation of Sakhalin, Russia.

=== Families and subfamilies ===
Zoarcoidei has the following families and subfamilies classified under it:

- Family Bathymasteridae Jordan & Gilbert, 1883 (ronquils)
- Family Cebidichthyidae Gill, 1862 (monkeyface pricklebacks)
- Family Stichaeidae Gill, 1864 (pricklebacks)
  - Subfamily Stichaeinae Gill, 1864
  - Subfamily Chirolophinae Jordan & Evermann, 1898
  - Subfamily Alectriinae Makushok, 1958 (cockscombs)
  - Subfamily Xiphisterinae Jordan, 1880
- Family Scytalinidae Jordan & Starks, 1895 (graveldivers)
- Family Opisthocentridae Jordan & Evermann, 1898 (rearspined fin pricklebacks)
- Family Ptilichthyidae Jordan & Gilbert, 1883 (quillfishes)
- Family Pholidae Gill, 1893 (gunnels)
  - Subfamily Pholinae Gill, 1893 (pigmented gunnels)
  - Subfamily Apodichthyinae Hubbs, 1927 (penpoint gunnels)
- Family Zaproridae Jordan, 1896 (prowfishes)
- Family Cryptacanthodidae Gill, 1861 (wrymouths)
- Family Lumpenidae Jordan & Evermann, 1898 (eel pricklebacks)
- Family Eulophiidae Smith, 1902 (spinous eelpouts)
- Family Neozoarcidae Jordan & Snyder, 1902 (largemouth kissing eelpouts)
- Family Anarhichadidae Bonaparte, 1835 (wolffishes)
- Family Zoarcidae Swainson, 1839 (eelpouts)
  - Subfamily Lycodinae Gill, 1861
  - Subfamily Lycozoarcinae Andriashev, 1939
  - Subfamily Zoarcinae Swainson, 1839 (eelpouts)
  - Subfamily Gymnelinae Gill, 1863 (pouts)

== Etymology ==
Zoarcoidei is based on the genus name Zoarces which was coined by Georges Cuvier in 1829 and which means "live bearing", as in the type species Zoarces viviparus, the viviparous blenny.

== Characteristics ==
The Zoarcoidei families all share a single feature, the possession of a single nostril, and there is no other features or group of features which mark out the Zoarcoids as a taxonomic grouping. Some fish, like the ones in Stichaeidae and Anarhichadidae, resemble eels by using an Anguilliform body.

== Distribution ==
The Zoarcoidei is thought to have originated in the northern hemisphere, particularly the northwestern Pacific Ocean and one of the families, the Zoarcidae, has colonised the southern hemisphere on a number of occasions.
