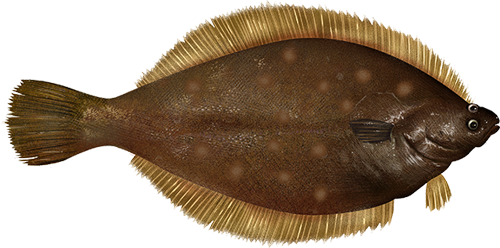

Conservation status
- Vulnerable (IUCN 3.1)

Scientific classification
- Domain: Eukaryota
- Kingdom: Animalia
- Phylum: Chordata
- Class: Actinopterygii
- Order: Carangiformes
- Suborder: Pleuronectoidei
- Family: Pleuronectidae
- Genus: Limanda
- Species: L. ferruginea

Binomial name
- Limanda ferruginea (Storer, 1839)
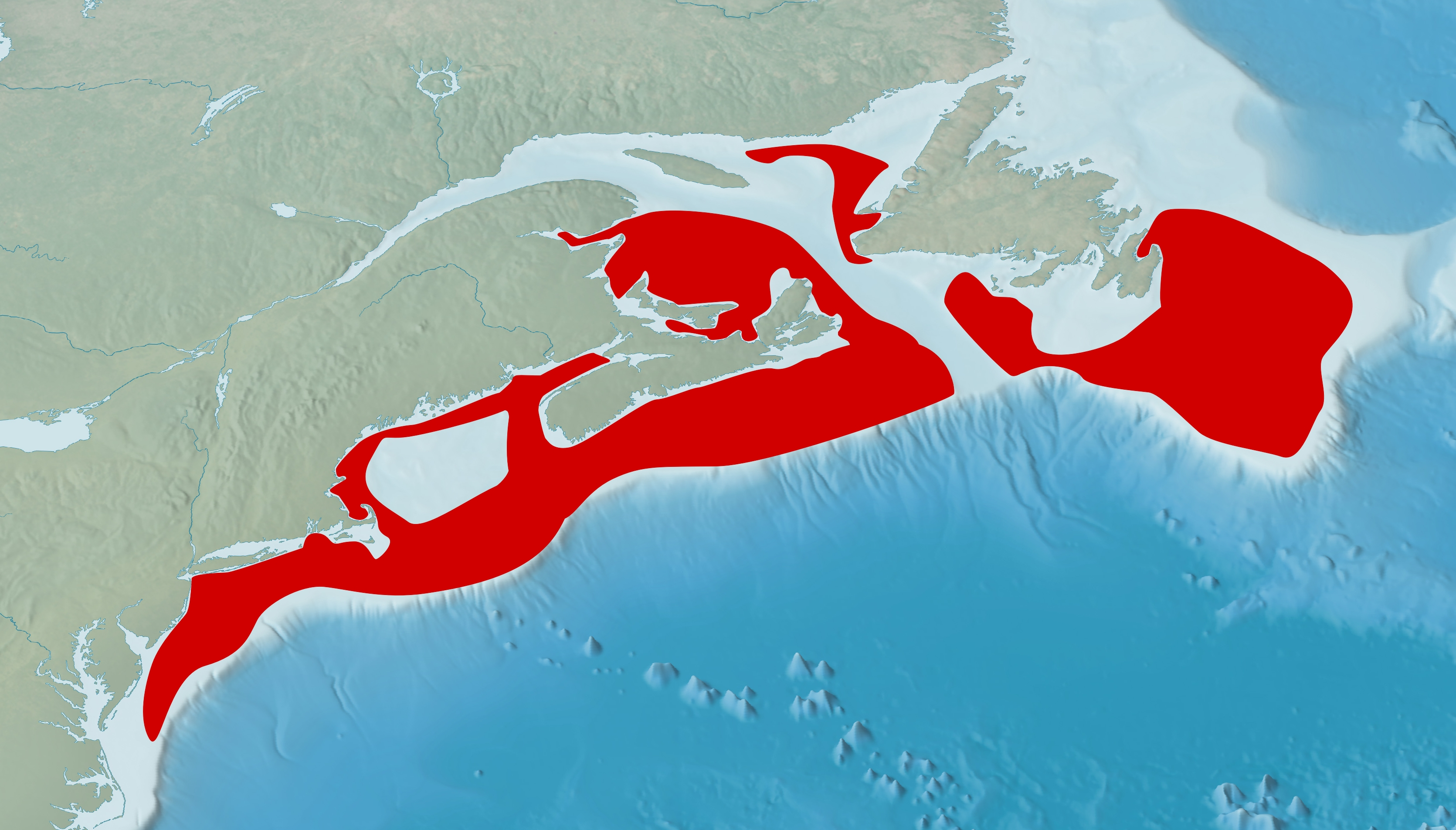
- Range

Synonyms
- Platessa ferruginea Storer, 1839; Pleuronectes ferruginea (Storer, 1839); Pleuronectes ferrugineus (Storer, 1839); Limanda vulgaris Gottsche, 1835; Limanda oceanica Bonaparte, 1846

= Yellowtail flounder =

Species of fish

The yellowtail flounder (Limanda ferruginea), also known as the rusty dab, is a species of flatfish in the family Pleuronectidae (righteye flounders). Reaching 56 cm (22 in) in length, it has reddish brown upperparts, pale underparts and yellow fins. Both its eyes are on the right (upper) side of its body. Found in the western North Atlantic, it has been fished commercially by North American fisheries for food. A victim of overfishing, the yellowtail flounder is categorized as "Vulnerable" by the International Union for Conservation of Nature.

== Taxonomy ==
The yellowtail flounder was originally described by German naturalist Carl Moritz Gottsche as Limanda vulgaris in the Archiv für Naturgeschichte in 1835. It was later documented as Platessa ferruginea by David Humphreys Storer in 1839, who noted the similarity between it and Limanda limanda (then considered to be in the genus Pleuronectes). He gave the species the common name of "rusty dab". Later, both P. limanda and P. ferruginea were reclassified into the genus Limanda. Meanwhile, American zoologist Theodore Gill had placed it in the new genus Myzopsetta in 1861.

According to 1996 research from the University of Ottawa, L. ferruginea shares several morphologies with Limanda aspera, but that the monophyly of the genus Limanda as a whole is unlikely. A 2018 cladistic morphological and genetic analysis found that the genus Limanda is not monophyletic; L. ferruginea and its relatives the longhead dab (L. proboscidea) and speckled flounder (L. punctatissima) are in a different subfamily to the other members of the genus and should be (once again) placed in the genus Myzopsetta.

== Description ==
The yellowtail flounder is a wide flatfish with an ovoid body, about half as broad as it is long. The name "yellowtail" comes from the distinctly yellowish color of its fins (including tail fin); the fish's upper side is reddish brown with irregular "rusty" spots, while the underside is white with a yellow caudal peduncle (area between body and tail). Being a right-eyed flounder (of the family Pleuronectidae), both its eyes are on the right side of the fish's body, though the eyes are symmetrical just after hatching. It is thinner than other flatfish.

The fish's head is approximately a quarter as long as the total body and is scaly. The eye's diameter is approximately one fifth the length of the head. The yellowtail flounder has a prominent lower jaw with broad lips, about as long as the eye. The scales are ciliated (having hair-like protrusions) and appear on the head as well. The teeth are small. Its dorsal fin, comprising about 80 rays, begins over the eye and has longer rays near the middle. The anal fin has a similar outline, but is only composed of about 60 rays. Relative to other flounders in the Gulf of Maine, the yellowtail flounder has a narrower and more concave head, with a pointier snout.

According to the National Marine Fisheries Service (NMFS), yellowtail flounders can grow to a length of 56 centimetres (22 in), weighing up to 1 kilogram (2.2 lb). Specimens up to 8.1 kg (18 lb) have been caught before.

== Distribution and habitat ==
The yellowtail flounder is found in the western North Atlantic Ocean, off the east coast of North America. Specimens have been found as far north as Newfoundland and southern Labrador and as far south as Chesapeake Bay. It is common on the Scotian Shelf, on ocean banks such as the Grand Banks of Newfoundland and Georges Bank.

Three fish stocks exist in US waters: in the Gulf of Maine area, on Georges Bank, and off southern New England and the Mid-Atlantic. In Canada, yellowtail are concentrated in NAFO divisions 4X (Browns Bank, near Georges Bank, at 42.826895°N 66.217355°W), 4W (Sable Island Bank, 43.83067°N 60.836686°W), and 4V (Banquereau, 44.535498°N 58.583968°W).

The larvae of L. ferruginea remain near the surface for two months, but after maturing to a length of at least 14 mm (0.55 in), they dwell on sandy or muddy seafloors at a depth between 30 and 100 metres (98 and 328 ft). As they live considerably deeper than other species of flounder, they are rarely seen along shores.

== Ecology ==
Yellowtail flounders have been reported to live up to seventeen years, but most die by age seven. They mature relatively early with females being able to reproduce by age three, spawning in the spring and summer. The eggs (measuring approximately 0.9 mm (0.035 in) in diameter) float to the surface and drift for approximately two months. The early larval stages closely resemble that of the winter flounder, though the appearance of the fin rays differentiates them.

They eat crustaceans (including amphipods, shrimps, mysids, and shellfish) as well as marine worms, and are preyed on by other fish such as spiny dogfish and skate. Yellowtail flounders are able to camouflage, changing the pattern of their skin to mimic the seafloor.

== Fishing and conservation ==
Yellowtail flounders have been commonly fished in Massachusetts Bay and Cape Cod Bay since the 1800s, after beam and otter trawls were introduced to fisheries in the area. In 1908, a total of 1,400,000 kilograms (3,000,000 lb) of yellowtail and winter flounder was caught near Cape Cod, an estimated half of which was yellowtail.

In the US, fishing of yellowtail flounder is governed by the NMFS. More than 526,000 kilograms (1,160,000 lb) of yellowtail flounder was commercially caught in American waters in 2020 (the vast majority in Massachusetts), valued at over $1 million. In federal waters, there is a minimum allowed size of 330 mm (13 in).

Populations of fishable yellowtail flounder have declined from the 1980s into the late 1990s in Canada, especially in divisions 4V and 4W, after which the rate of fishery declined. L. ferruginea is currently categorized as "Vulnerable" by the International Union for Conservation of Nature. According to the University of Maine, yellowtail flounder are being overfished, as well as several other species of flounder. According to NMFS, the fishing rate is being reduced at Georges Bank and there are rebuilding plans to increase populations of all three stocks.

Yellowtail flounders are fished between late fall and spring, usually with a trawl net or gillnet. Hooks are ineffective as their mouths are small.

== As food ==
Yellowtail flounder is sweet and mild, while being a lean source of B vitamins, including niacin. The texture is delicate and flaky.
