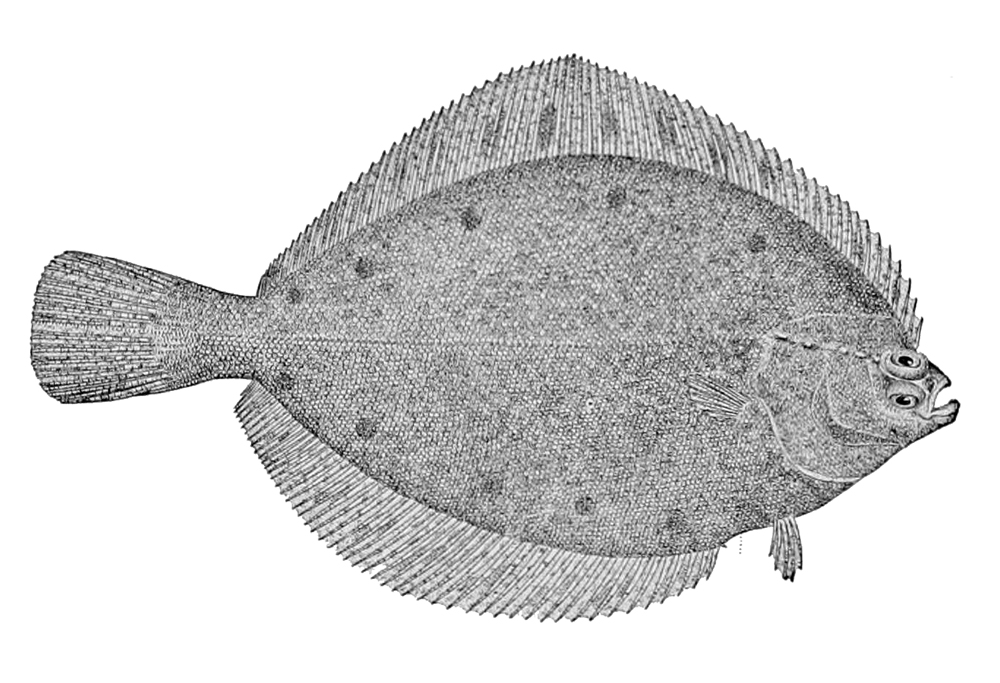

Scientific classification
- Kingdom: Animalia
- Phylum: Chordata
- Class: Actinopterygii
- Division: Teleostei
- Order: Carangiformes
- Suborder: Pleuronectoidei
- Family: Pleuronectidae
- Genus: Pleuronectes
- Species: P. quadrituberculatus

Binomial name
- Pleuronectes quadrituberculatus Pallas, 1814

Synonyms
- Pleuronectes pallasii Steindachner, 1879

= Alaska plaice =

Species of fish

Alaska plaice (Pleuronectes quadrituberculatus) is a saltwater fish that live in the North Pacific Ocean. Alaska plaice are right-eye flounders which live on the sandy bottoms of the continental shelf, up to 600 metres deep. Their geographic range is from the Gulf of Alaska in the east, to the Chukchi Sea in the north, to the Sea of Japan in the west. Alaska plaice feed mostly on polychaetes, but also eat amphipods and echiurans.

Most commercial fisheries do not target Alaska plaice, and bycatch by commercial trawlers targeting other groundfish is the sole source of significant harvest of this species. Large schools of Alaska plaice are commonly associated with schools of Yellowfin sole, and bycatch rates can reach relatively high levels. The 2005 total allowable catch in the Bering Sea and Aleutian Islands management area (BSAI) was reached before the end of May of that year.

Alaska plaice can live for up to 30 years, and grow to 60 centimetres (24 inches) long, but most that get caught are only seven or eight years old, and about 30 cm (12 in). They are brown on the eyed side and typically pale to bright yellow on the blind side. Five to seven small boney cones are found on the head on the eyed side.

== See also ==
- American plaice
- European plaice
