= Plaice =

Common name for a group of flatfish

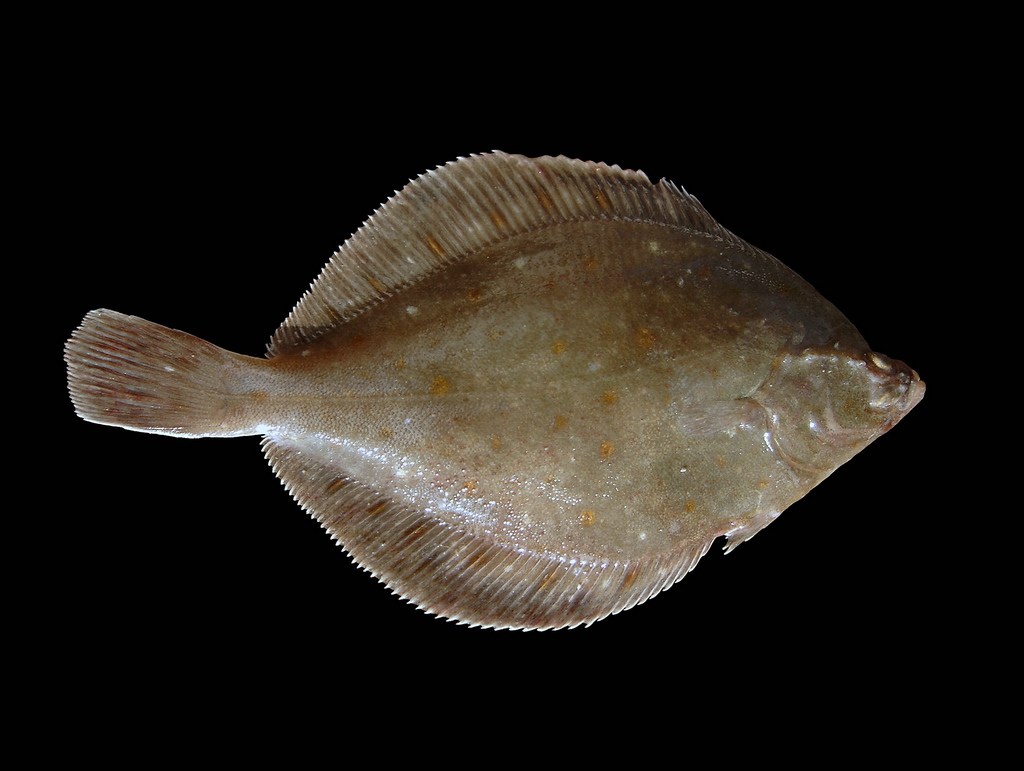
European plaice

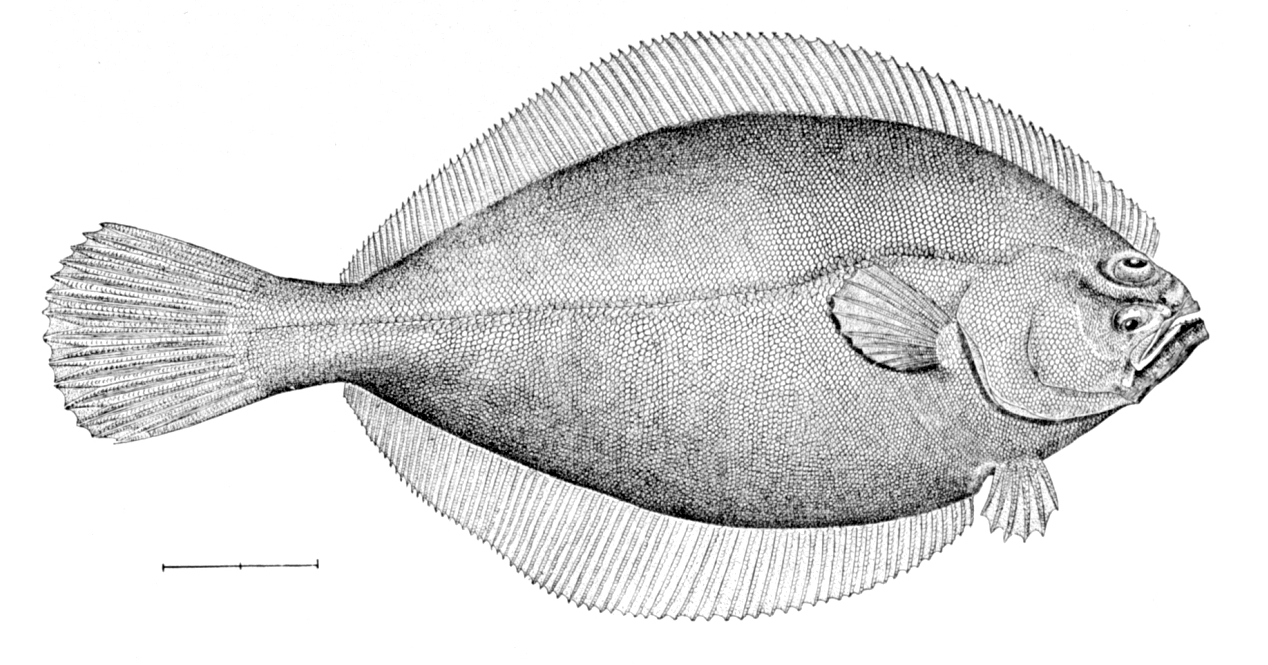
American plaice

Plaice is a common name for a group of flatfish that comprises four species: the European, American, Alaskan and scale-eye plaice.

Commercially, the most important plaice is the European. The principal commercial flatfish in Europe, it is also widely fished recreationally, has potential as an aquaculture species, and is kept as an aquarium fish. The American plaice is also commercially important.

The term plaice (plural plaice) comes from the 14th-century Anglo-French plais. This in turn comes from the late Latin platessa, meaning flatfish, which originated from the Ancient Greek platys, meaning broad.

== Plaice species ==
=== European plaice ===
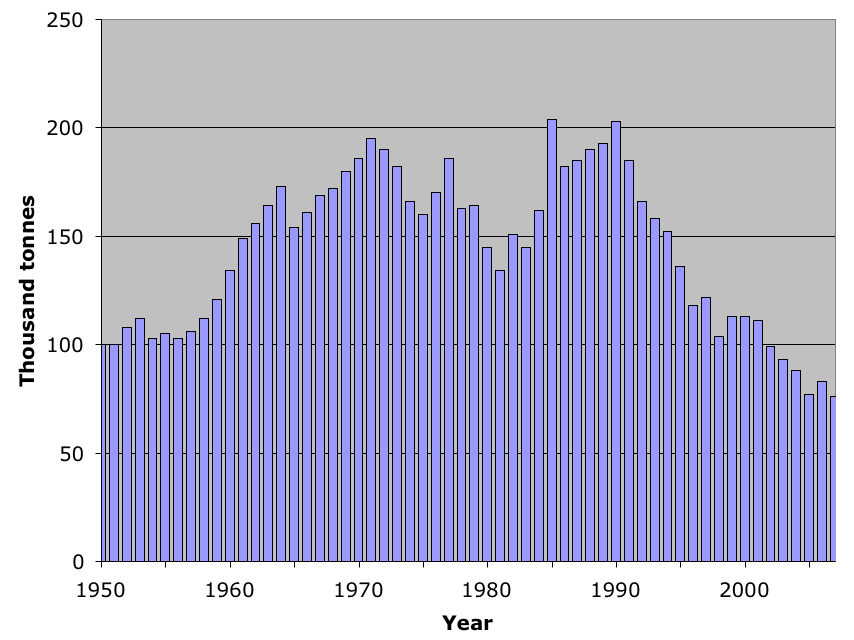
World catch of European plaice in thousands of tonnes, based on FAO catch data

External image
- Distribution map for European plaice (The Sea Around Us)

The European plaice (Pleuronectes platessa) is a right-eyed flounder belonging to the family Pleuronectidae. It is a commercially important flatfish that lives on the sandy bottoms of the European shelf. It ranges geographically from the Barents Sea to the Mediterranean. European plaice are characterised by their smooth brown skin, with distinctive red spots and a bony ridge behind the eyes. They feed on polychaetes, crustaceans and bivalves and can be found at depths of up to 200 metres. At night they move into shallow waters to feed and during the day they bury themselves in the sand. Their maximum recorded length is 100 cm (39 in) and maximum reported age 50 years.

Together with sole, European plaice form a group of flatfish that are the most important flatfish in Europe. European plaice have been fished from the North Sea for hundreds of years. They are usually fished from beam trawlers, otter trawlers or seiners. In the Celtic Sea the plaice species is considered overfished.

Comparison of world catch by weight 2007 for European plaice, using FAO catch data

=== American plaice ===
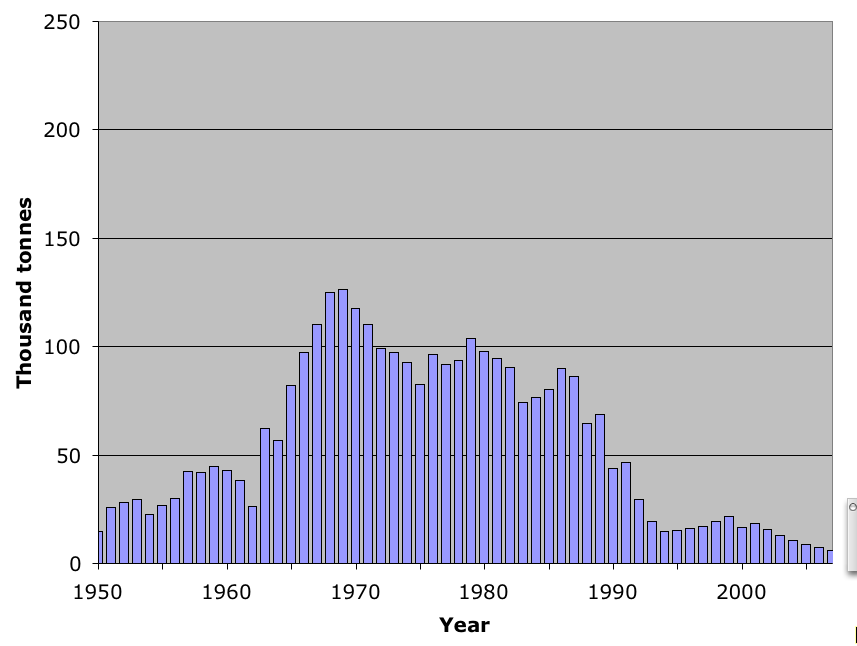
World catch of American plaice in thousands of tonnes, based on FAO catch data

External image
- Distribution map for American plaice(The Sea Around Us)

Like the European plaice, the American plaice is a right eyed flatfish belonging to the family Pleuronectidae. American plaice are an Atlantic species, which range from southern Labrador to Rhode Island. They are also found in Europe, where they are called rough dab or long rough dab. They spawn in the Gulf of Maine, with peak activity in April and May. They are brown or reddish, and are generally smaller than European plaice, with a rougher skin and larger scales. Their maximum recorded length is 82.6 cm (32.5 in), and maximum reported age 30 years. They are usually found between depths of 90 and 250 m (300 and 820 ft) on sandy bottoms with temperatures between −0.5 and 2.5 °C (31.1 and 36.5 °F). They feed on small fishes and invertebrates.

The species is considered by the Northwest Atlantic Fisheries Organization to be overfished, with no signs of recovery. Though they are also currently endangered in Canada due to overfishing, the Canadian government believes the species is abundant. Flatfish, as a group, are second-most caught (by weight) only to cod in Canada, with American plaice accounting for 50 percent of all flatfish caught.

American plaice may be an intermediate host for the nematode parasite Otostrongylus circumlitis, which is a lungworm of seals, primarily affecting animals less than 1 year of age.

Comparison of world catch by weight 2004 for American plaice, using FAO catch data

=== Alaska plaice ===
External image
- [ https://www.seaaroundus.org/data/#/spatial-catch?dist=604250 Distribution map for Alaskan plaice] (The Sea Around Us)

Alaska plaice can live for up to 30 years and grow to 60 cm (24 in) long, but most that are caught are only seven or eight years old and about 30 cm (12 in).

Most commercial fisheries do not target Alaska plaice, but many are caught as bycatch by commercial trawlers trying to catch other bottom fish. Thus, many Alaska plaice get caught anyway — so much so that, for example, the 2005 total allowable catch in the Bering Sea and Aleutian Islands management area (BSAI) was reached before the end of May of that year.

=== Scale-eye plaice ===
The scale-eye plaice is a flatfish of the family Pleuronectidae. It is a demersal fish that lives at depths of 18 to 900 m (59 to 3,000 ft). It can reach 46 cm (18 in) in length and can weigh up to 1.2 kg (2.6 lb). Its native habitat is the northern Pacific, primarily from the Sea of Okhotsk to Japan and Korea, though it is also found in the Bering Sea.

== Current conservation and management status ==
Plaice, along with the other major demersal fish in the North Sea such as cod, monkfish and sole, is listed by the ICES as "outside safe biological limits." Moreover, they are growing less quickly now and are rarely older than six years, whereas they can reach forty. The World Wide Fund for Nature says that in 2006 "of the eight plaice stocks recognised by ICES, only one is considered to be harvested sustainably while three are overexploited. Data is insufficient to assess the remaining stocks; however, landings for all stocks are at or near historical lows."

== In cuisine and culture ==
In North German and Danish cuisine, plaice is one of the most commonly eaten fish. Filleted, battered, and pan-fried plaice is popular hot or cold as an open sandwich topping together with remoulade sauce and lemon slices. Battered plaice is often served hot with french fries and remoulade sauce as a main dish; this fish and chips variant is popular and is commonly available on children's menus in Danish restaurants. Breaded frozen plaice, ready to be baked or fried at home, are readily available in supermarkets. Fresh plaice is also oven-baked.

"The flesh of plaice is white, tender and subtle-flavoured."

Smoked plaice is one of the traditional summer time delicacies of Hiiumaa, Estonia.
