= Northern rock sole =

Conservation status
- Least Concern (IUCN 3.1)

Scientific classification
- Domain: Eukaryota
- Kingdom: Animalia
- Phylum: Chordata
- Class: Actinopterygii
- Order: Carangiformes
- Suborder: Pleuronectoidei
- Family: Pleuronectidae
- Genus: Lepidopsetta
- Species: L. polyxystra

Binomial name
- Lepidopsetta polyxystra J. W. Orr & Matarese, 2000

Species of fish

The northern rock sole (Lepidopsetta polyxystra) is a flatfish of the family Pleuronectidae. It is a demersal fish that lives on sand, mud and gravel bottoms at depths of up to 700 metres (2,300 ft), though it is most commonly found between 19 and 246 metres (62 and 807 ft). Its native habitat is the temperate waters of the northern Pacific, from Puget Sound to Alaska (overlapping the range of the rock sole), the Aleutian Islands and across the Bering Sea to the Kuril Islands and the Sea of Okhotsk (overlapping the range of the dusky sole). Males grow up to 69 centimetres (27 in) in length, whilst females can reach 49 centimetres (19 in). The maximum recorded lifespan is 18 years.

== Taxonomy and nomenclature ==
Prior to 2000 the Northern rock sole and the rock sole, Lepidopsetta bilineata, were considered to be a single species under the genus Lepidopsetta, but work by Orr & Matarese published in 2000 reorganised the genus into three separate taxa.

As a result of this reclassification and renaming, the rock sole L. bilineata may be referred to as the "southern" rock sole, in order to avoid confusion with the Northern rock sole L. polyxystra.

== Role in ecosystem ==
The Northern rock sole occupies a moderately high trophic level in the food chain.

=== Diet ===
The diet of the Northern rock sole consists mainly of zoobenthos polychaetes and amphipods.

=== Predators ===
Northern rock sole are eaten by marine mammals and other fish, including sharks, Alaska pollock, yellowfin sole, Pacific halibut and Pacific cod.

== Reproduction ==
Northern rock sole reach reproductive maturity at between 4 and 7 years old, and spawn in winter through to early spring. Eggs are demersal and stick to the surface on which they are laid; hatching takes from 6 to 25 days.

== Commercial fishing ==
Northern rock sole is fished commercially, and forms an important part of two trawl fisheries in the Bering Sea and Gulf of Alaska. Although it was overfished in the 1960s stocks have recovered, and the biomass of Northern rock sole in the Bering Sea and Aleutian Islands fishery is now estimated to be very high, at twice the level required to support maximum sustainable yield. In 2008 the estimated Northern rock sole biomass in the Gulf of Alaska fishery was some 102,303 tons, compared to catches ranging from 453 tons in 2004 to 4,330 tons in 2006.

Northern rock sole fishing off the coast of the United States is managed by the North Pacific Fishery Management Council, one of eight U.S. Regional Fishery Management Councils.
