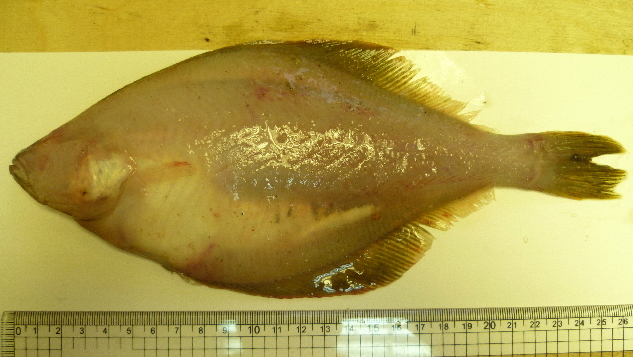

Conservation status
- Least Concern (IUCN 3.1)

Scientific classification
- Kingdom: Animalia
- Phylum: Chordata
- Class: Actinopterygii
- Order: Carangiformes
- Suborder: Pleuronectoidei
- Family: Pleuronectidae
- Genus: Limanda
- Species: L. sakhalinensis

Binomial name
- Limanda sakhalinensis C. L. Hubbs, 1915

Synonyms
- Pleuronectes sakhalinensis (Hubbs, 1915); Limanda korigarei Hubbs, 1915

= Sakhalin sole =

Species of fish

The Sakhalin sole (Limanda sakhalinensis) is a flatfish of the family Pleuronectidae. It is a demersal fish that lives on bottoms at depths of between 10 and 360 metres (30 and 1,180 ft), though it is most commonly found between around 50 and 100 metres (160 and 330 ft). Its native habitat is the polar waters of the northwestern Pacific, from the Sea of Okhotsk to the west and central Bering Sea, as far as the Pribilof Islands. It can reach up to 36 centimetres (14 in) in length, though the common length is around 21.5 centimetres (8.5 in). The maximum recorded weight is 500 grams (18 oz), and the maximum recorded lifespan is 8 years.

== Description ==
The Sakhalin sole is elongate to oval in shape, with a small mouth and a convex space between the eyes. It has a uniformly medium to dark brown upper side and a white underside. Its fins are brown, and its lateral line has a high to medium arch over the pectoral fin. It is similar in appearance to the yellowfin sole and the rock sole.

== Diet ==
The diet of the Sakhalin sole consists mainly of zoobenthos organisms, including polychaetes, amphipods, krill and other crustaceans.
