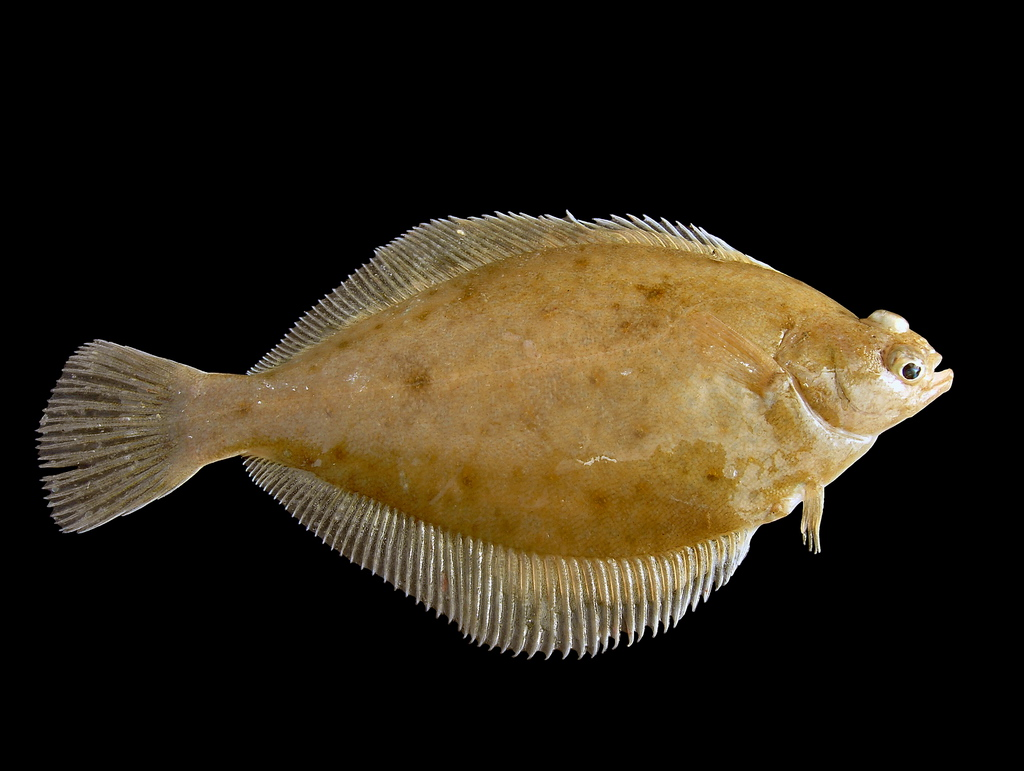
- Common dab (L. limanda)

Scientific classification
- Kingdom: Animalia
- Phylum: Chordata
- Class: Actinopterygii
- Order: Carangiformes
- Suborder: Pleuronectoidei
- Family: Pleuronectidae
- Subfamily: Pleuronectinae
- Genus: Limanda; Gottsche, 1835

Type species
- Pleuronectes limanda Linnaeus, 1758

Synonyms
- Myzopsetta Gill, 1861

= Limanda =

Limanda Temporal range: Middle Miocene–present

Genus of flounders

Limanda is a genus of righteye flounders native to the northern Atlantic and Pacific oceans.

A 2018 cladistic morphological and genetic analysis found that the genus is not monophyletic, and has proposed L. ferruginea, L. proboscidea and L. punctatissima be placed in the genus Myzopsetta.

== Species ==
There are currently six recognized species in this genus:

- Limanda aspera (Pallas, 1814) (Yellowfin sole)
- Limanda ferruginea (D. H. Storer (fr), 1839) (Yellowtail flounder)
- Limanda limanda (Linnaeus, 1758) (Common dab)
- Limanda proboscidea C. H. Gilbert, 1896 (Longhead dab)
- Limanda punctatissima (Steindachner, 1879) (Speckled flounder)
- Limanda sakhalinensis C. L. Hubbs, 1915 (Sakhalin sole)

A single fossil species, †Limanda asperoides (Nazarkin, 1997) (originally described in Pleuronectes) is also known from the Middle Miocene of Sakhalin, Russia.
