= H. robustus =

H. robustus may refer to:

- Heilprinia robustus, a sea snail species
- Hippoglossoides robustus, the Bering flounder, a flatfish species native to the northern Pacific
- Hyperolius robustus, a frog species endemic to Democratic Republic of the Congo
