= Crab duplex-specific nuclease =

Crab duplex-specific nuclease is a nuclease derived from the red king crab (Paralithodes camtschaticus, Kamchatka crab) hepatopancreas that displays a strong preference for cleaving double-stranded DNA and DNA in DNA–RNA hybrid duplexes, compared to single-stranded DNA.

The cleavage rate of short, perfectly matched DNA duplexes by this enzyme is essentially higher than that for non-perfectly matched duplexes of the same length. It has been applied to SNP detection and RNA normalization.
