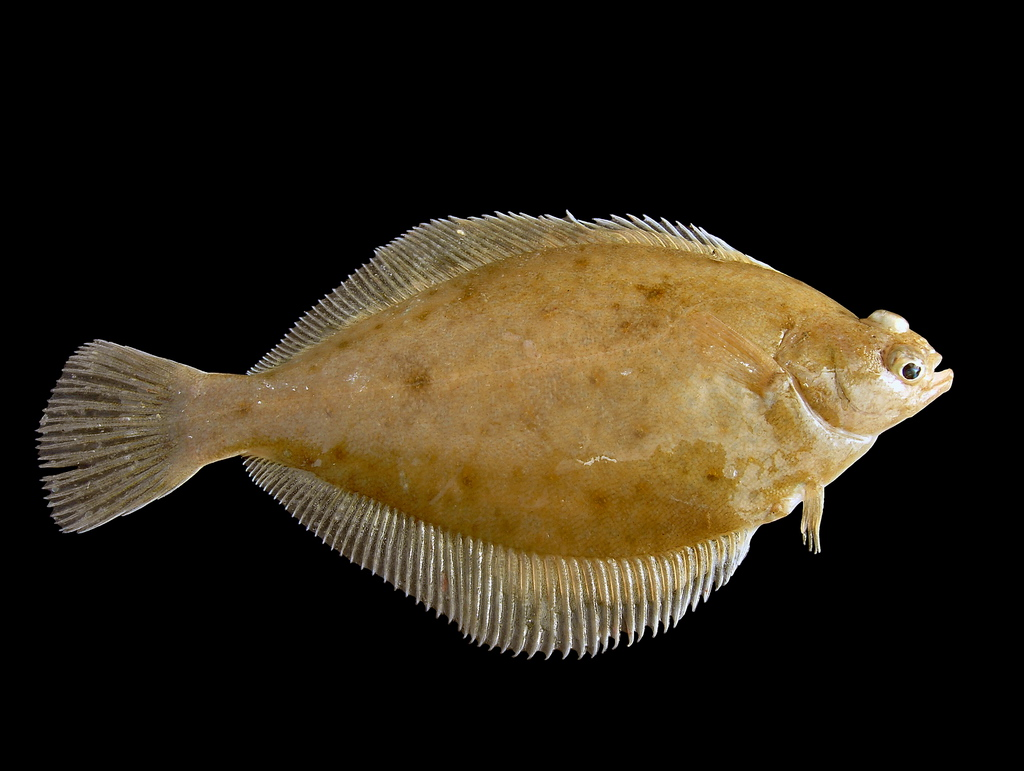

Conservation status
- Least Concern (IUCN 3.1)

Scientific classification
- Kingdom: Animalia
- Phylum: Chordata
- Class: Actinopterygii
- Division: Teleostei
- Order: Carangiformes
- Suborder: Pleuronectoidei
- Family: Pleuronectidae
- Genus: Limanda
- Species: L. limanda

Binomial name
- Limanda limanda (Linnaeus, 1758)
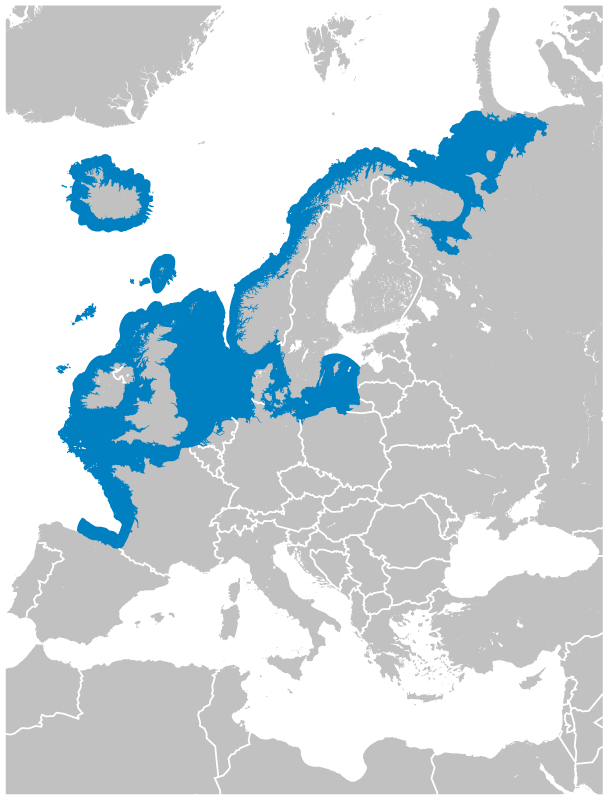
- Common dab range.

Synonyms
- Pleuronectes limanda Linnaeus, 1758; Liopsetta limanda (Linnaeus, 1758); Pleuronectes limandula Bonnaterre, 1788; Limanda vulgaris Gottsche 1835

= Common dab =

Species of fish

The common dab (Limanda limanda) is an edible flatfish of the family Pleuronectidae. It is a demersal fish native to shallow seas around Northern Europe, in particular the North Sea, where it lives on sandy bottoms down to depths of about 100 metres (330 ft). It can reach 40 centimetres (16 in) in length and can weigh up to 1 kilogram (2.2 lb), though most specimens grow no longer than 20 centimetres (7.9 in).

== Taxonomy and nomenclature ==
The etymology of the name dab is unclear, but the modern English use seems to originate from the Middle English dabbe. It is first recorded in the late 16th century.

The common dab was first named Pleuronectes limanda by Carl Linnaeus in the 1758 10th edition of Systema Naturae. It has also been moved to other genera, including Liopsetta, and is now known as Limanda limanda.

== Identification ==
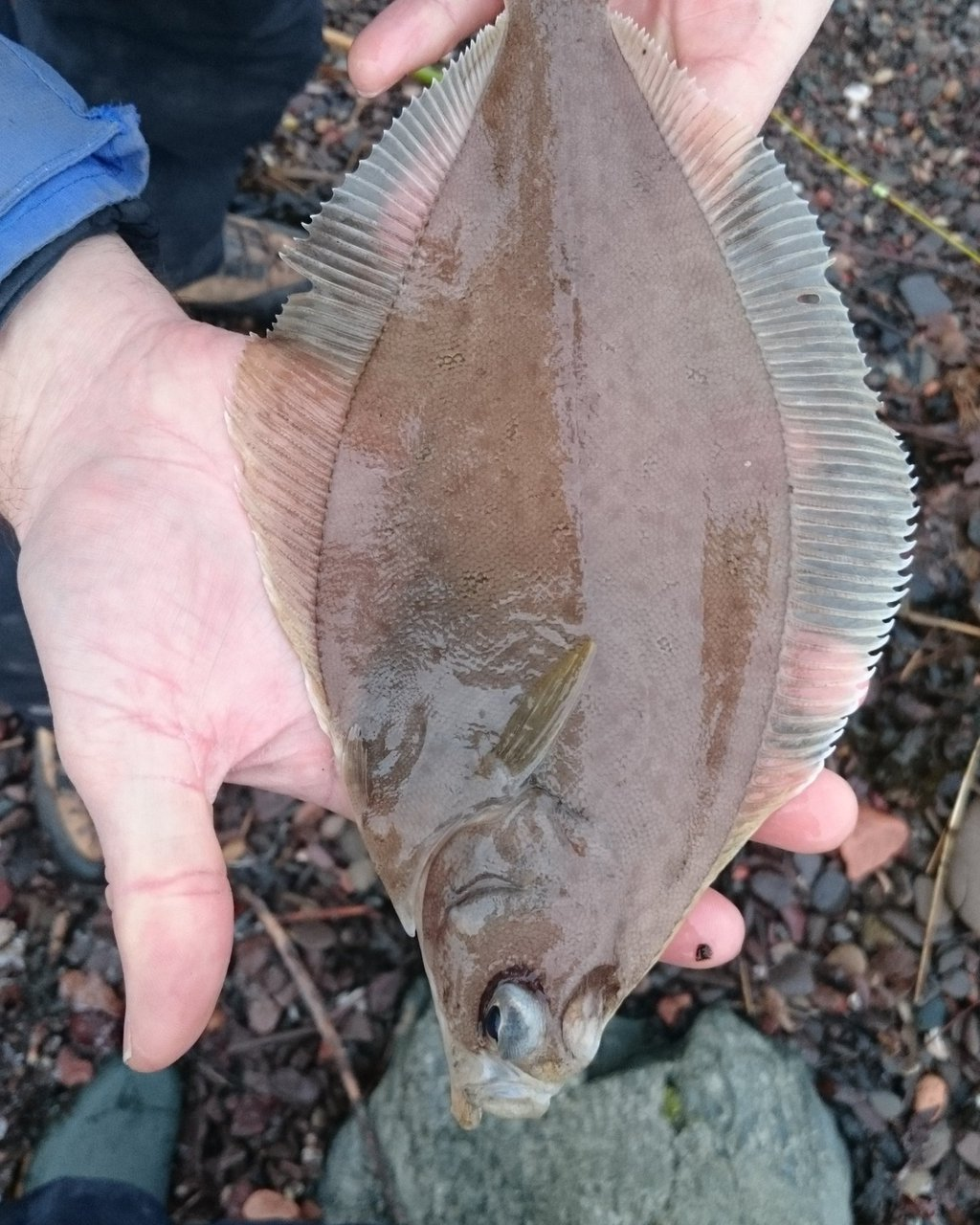
Common dab caught while fishing

The common dab has a similar appearance to both the plaice and the flounder, and similarly has both its eyes normally on the right-hand side of its body. The upper surface is usually pale brown in colour with scattered darker blotches and speckles, but does not have the orange spots typical of a plaice. They are distinguished from flounder by their translucent body. The pectoral fins may be orange. The lateral line is marked by a distinctive semi-circular curve above the pectoral fin. The dorsal and anal fins form a gently rounded curve round the margin of the body. The scales have rough posterior edges and this fish has no large bony projections. A typical size is in the range 25 to 40 cm (10 to 16 in).

== Diet ==
The common dab's diet consists of zoobenthos organisms such as marine worms, molluscs, sand eels, amphipods, crustaceans, echinoderms and smaller fishes.

== Distribution ==
The common dab is a bottom dweller, found in coastal waters in the northeastern Atlantic Ocean. Its range extends from the Bay of Biscay to Iceland and the White Sea and includes the North Sea and the western part of the Baltic Sea.

== Commercial fishing ==
The dab is an abundant fish and until recently was mostly ignored as a commercial fish, with most dab only retained when they were caught as by-catch of other targeted species. However, the declining numbers of other food fish such as cod and haddock has seen dab become an increasingly important commercial species. They are now targeted by an increasing number of commercial vessels, especially in the North Sea. A number of high-profile celebrity chefs such as Jamie Oliver have attempted to get people to eat more dab in order to take the pressure off the species of commercial fish which are currently heavily exploited.
