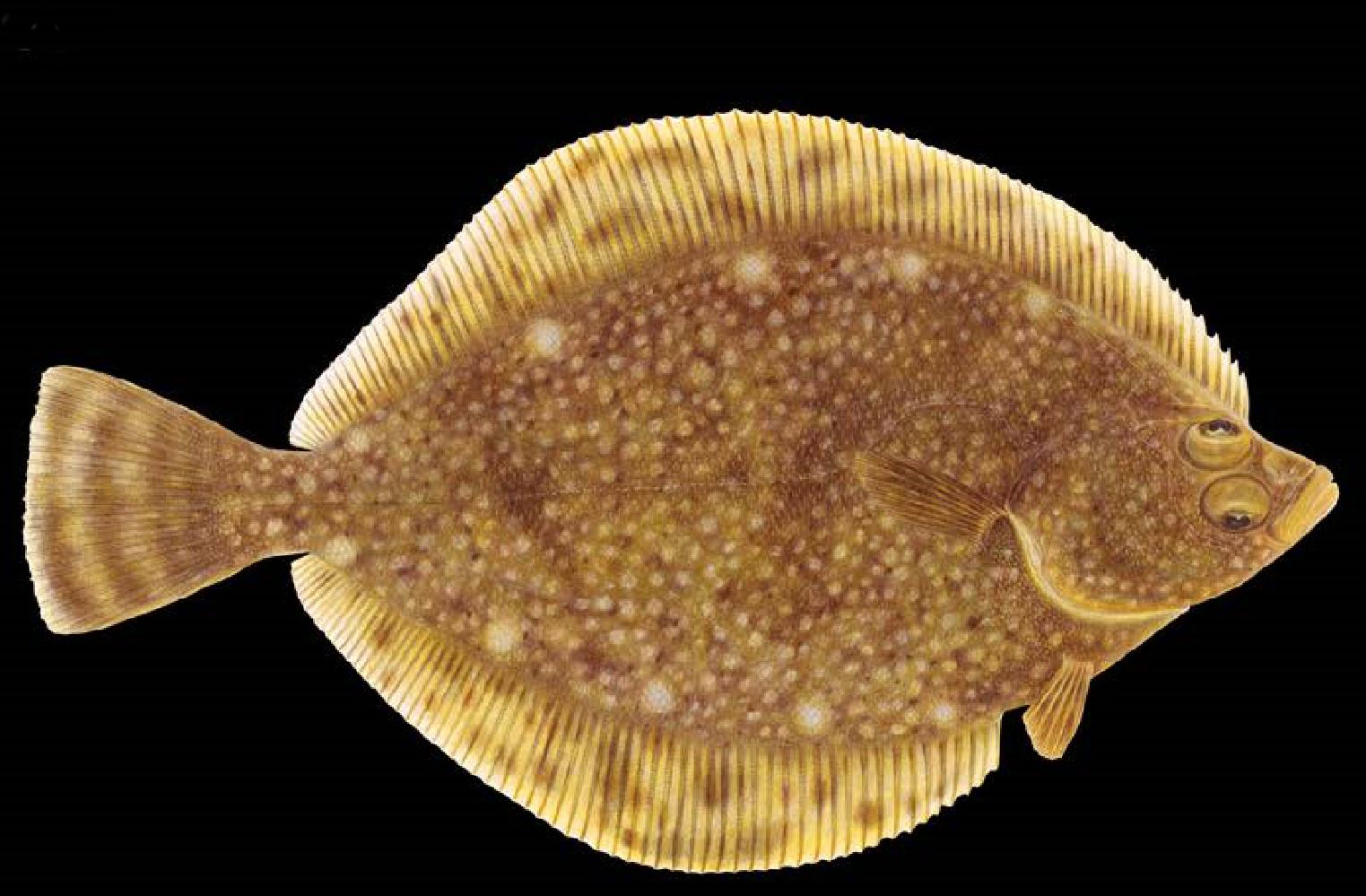
- Lepidopsetta bilineata

Scientific classification
- Domain: Eukaryota
- Kingdom: Animalia
- Phylum: Chordata
- Class: Actinopterygii
- Order: Carangiformes
- Suborder: Pleuronectoidei
- Family: Pleuronectidae
- Subfamily: Pleuronectinae
- Genus: Lepidopsetta; T. N. Gill, 1862

Type species
- Platichthys umbrosus Girard, 1856

= Lepidopsetta =

Genus of fishes

Lepidopsetta is a genus of righteye flounders native to the North Pacific Ocean.

== Species ==
There are currently three recognized species in this genus:

- Lepidopsetta bilineata (Ayres, 1855) (Rock sole)
- Lepidopsetta mochigarei Snyder, 1911 (Dusky sole)
- Lepidopsetta polyxystra J. W. Orr & Matarese, 2000 (Northern rock sole)
