= Flathead flounder =

Scientific classification
- Kingdom: Animalia
- Phylum: Chordata
- Class: Actinopterygii
- Order: Carangiformes
- Suborder: Pleuronectoidei
- Family: Pleuronectidae
- Genus: Hippoglossoides
- Species: H. dubius

Binomial name
- Hippoglossoides dubius Schmidt, 1904

Synonyms
- Hippoglossoides katakurae Snyder, 1911

Species of fish

The flathead flounder (Hippoglossoides dubius) is a flatfish of the family Pleuronectidae. It is a demersal fish that lives on bottoms in shallow coastal waters, at depths of between 10 and 600 metres (33 and 1,969 ft). Its native habitat is the northwestern Pacific, particularly the seas of Japan and Okhotsk, and the coastlines of Kamchatka and Korea. It grows up to 45 centimetres (18 in) in length.

== Reproduction ==
The flathead flounder spawning season is from February to April, and spawning takes place at depths of 180 and 200 metres (590 and 660 ft). Females undergo one reproductive cycle per year and produce between 90,000 and 950,000 eggs during each cycle.
