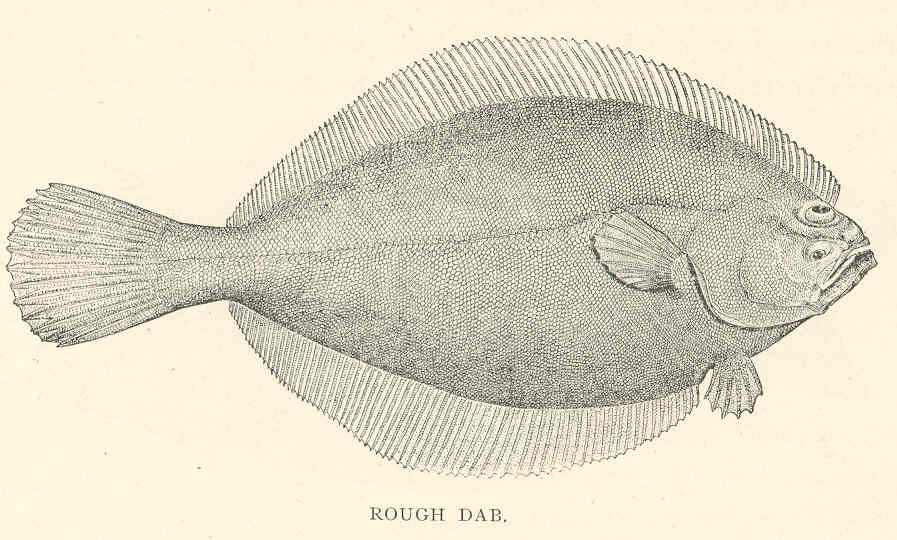
- Hippoglossoides platessoides

Scientific classification
- Kingdom: Animalia
- Phylum: Chordata
- Class: Actinopterygii
- Order: Carangiformes
- Suborder: Pleuronectoidei
- Family: Pleuronectidae
- Subfamily: Pleuronectinae
- Genus: Hippoglossoides; Gottsche, 1835

Type species
- Hippoglossoides limanda Gottsche, 1835

Synonyms
- Cynopsetta Jordan & Starks (ex Schmidt) 1906; Drepanopsetta Gill, 1861; Pomatopsetta Gill, 1864

= Hippoglossoides =

Hippoglossoides Temporal range: Middle Miocene–present

Genus of fishes

Hippoglossoides is a genus of righteye flounders native to the North Pacific and North Atlantic oceans.

== Species ==
There are currently four recognized species in this genus:

- Hippoglossoides dubius Schmidt, 1904 (Flathead flounder)
- Hippoglossoides elassodon Jordan & Gilbert, 1880 (Flathead sole)
- Hippoglossoides platessoides (O. Fabricius, 1780) (American plaice)
- Hippoglossoides robustus Gill & Townsend, 1897 (Bering flounder)

Three fossil species are also known:

- †Hippoglossoides kumaishi Sakamoto & Uyeno, 1991 (Middle Miocene of Japan)
- †Hippoglossoides naritai Sakamoto & Uyeno, 1989 (Middle Miocene of Japan)
- †Hippoglossoides pristinus (Jordan, 1927) (Late Miocene of California, USA)
