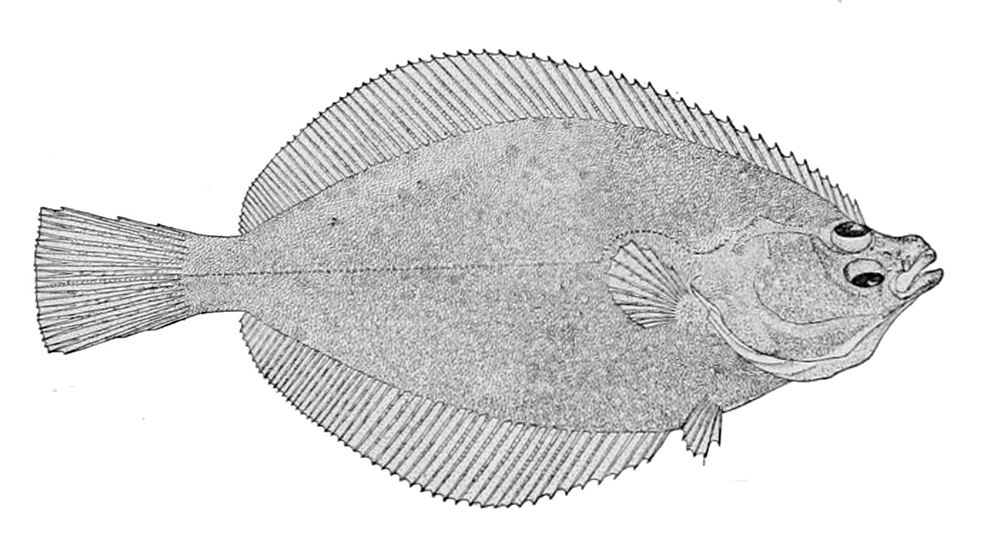

Scientific classification
- Domain: Eukaryota
- Kingdom: Animalia
- Phylum: Chordata
- Class: Actinopterygii
- Order: Carangiformes
- Suborder: Pleuronectoidei
- Family: Pleuronectidae
- Genus: Limanda
- Species: L. proboscidea

Binomial name
- Limanda proboscidea Gilbert, 1896

Synonyms
- Myzopsetta proboscidea (Gilbert, 1896); Pleuronectes proboscidea (Gilbert, 1896); Pleuronectes proboscideus (Gilbert, 1896)

= Longhead dab =

Species of fish

The longhead dab (Limanda proboscidea) is a flatfish of the family Pleuronectidae. It is a demersal fish that lives on bottoms at depths of up to 160 metres (520 ft), though it is most commonly found between 10 and 125 metres (33 and 410 ft). Its native habitat is the temperate waters of the northern Pacific, and it range stretches from the Sea of Okhotsk and the Kuril Islands to the Bering Sea and the arctic west coast of Canada. Males grow up to 40 centimetres (16 in) in length, though the common length is around 17.5 centimetres (6.9 in).

== Diet ==
The diet of the longhead dab consists mainly of zoobenthos organisms, including polychaetes, bivalves, amphipods and other benthos crustaceans.
