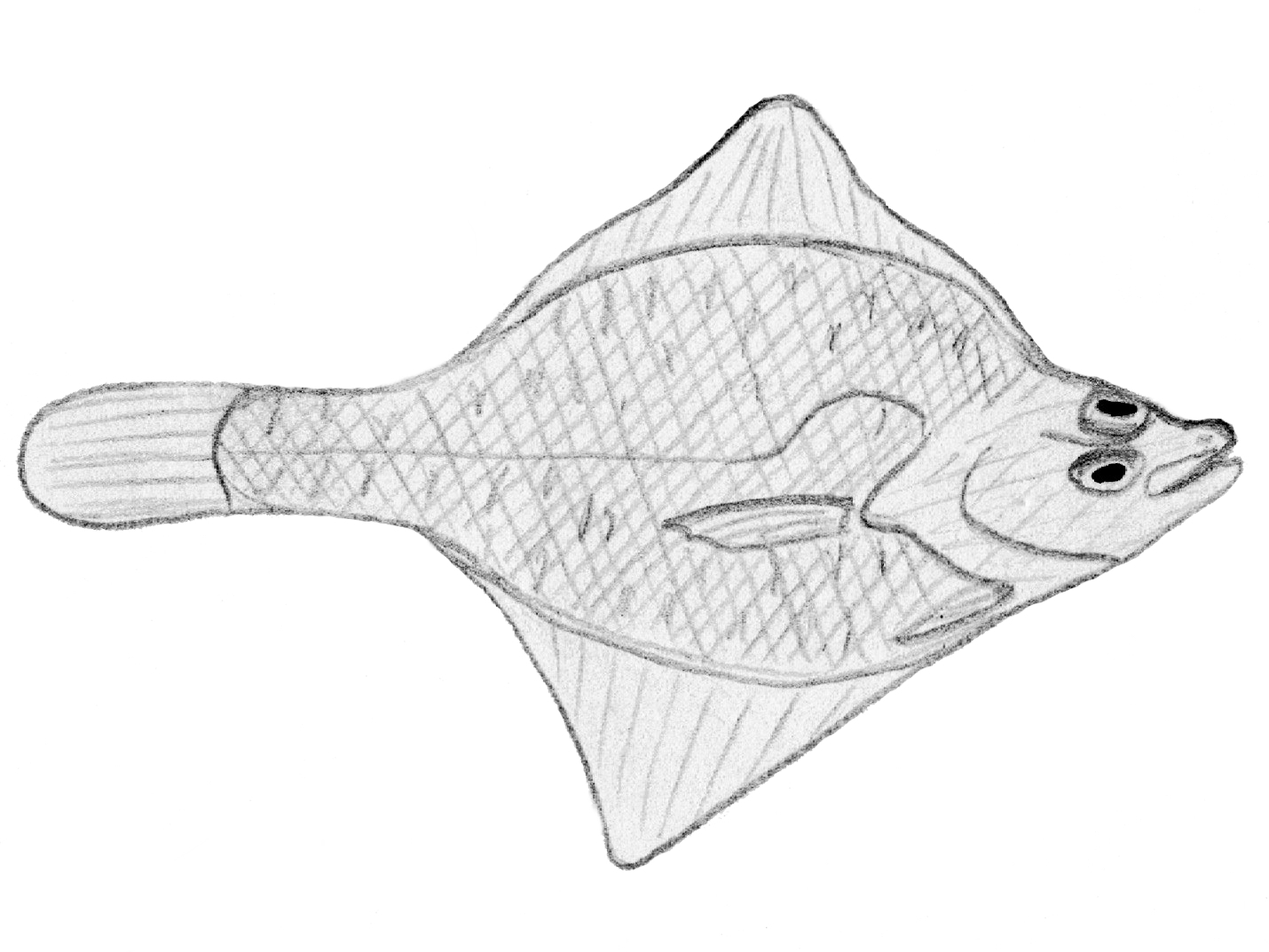

Scientific classification
- Domain: Eukaryota
- Kingdom: Animalia
- Phylum: Chordata
- Class: Actinopterygii
- Order: Carangiformes
- Suborder: Pleuronectoidei
- Family: Pleuronectidae
- Genus: Limanda
- Species: L. punctatissima

Binomial name
- Limanda punctatissima (Steindachner, 1879)

Synonyms
- Hippoglossoides punctatissimus Steindachner, 1879; Pleuronectes punctatissimus (Steindachner, 1879); Limanda iridorum Jordan & Starks, 1906

= Speckled flounder =

Species of fish

The speckled flounder (Limanda punctatissima) is a flatfish of the family Pleuronectidae. It is a demersal fish that lives on bottoms in the temperate waters of the northwestern Pacific, from the southern Sea of Okhotsk and the Kuril Islands to the Sea of Japan, including coastal areas of Japan and Korea. It can grow up to 40 centimetres (16 in) in length, and can weigh up to 450 grams (16 oz).
