= Dusky sole =

Scientific classification
- Kingdom: Animalia
- Phylum: Chordata
- Class: Actinopterygii
- Division: Teleostei
- Order: Carangiformes
- Suborder: Pleuronectoidei
- Family: Pleuronectidae
- Genus: Lepidopsetta
- Species: L. mochigarei

Binomial name
- Lepidopsetta mochigarei Snyder, 1911

Synonyms
- Pleuronectes mochigarei (Snyder, 1911)

Species of fish

The dusky sole, Lepidopsetta mochigarei, is a flatfish of the family Pleuronectidae. It is a demersal fish that lives on bottoms in the temperate waters of the northwest Pacific, from the Korean Peninsula to the southern Sea of Okhotsk. It grows up to 40 centimetres (16 in) in length.
