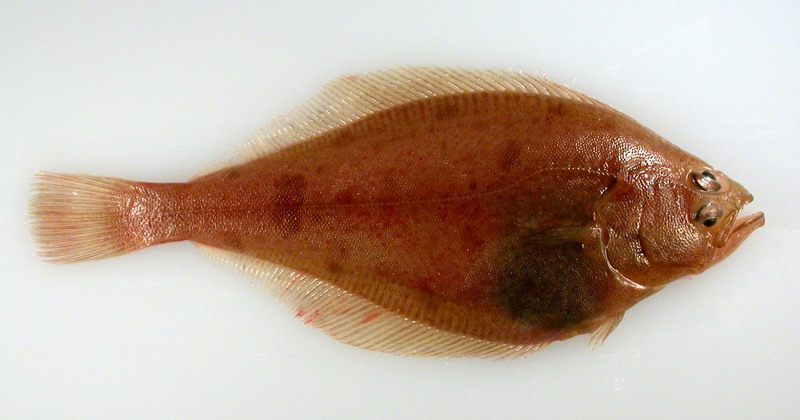

Scientific classification
- Kingdom: Animalia
- Phylum: Chordata
- Class: Actinopterygii
- Division: Teleostei
- Order: Carangiformes
- Suborder: Pleuronectoidei
- Family: Pleuronectidae
- Genus: Hippoglossoides
- Species: H. robustus

Binomial name
- Hippoglossoides robustus Gill & Townsend, 1897

Synonyms
- Hippoglossoides hamiltoni Jordan & Gilbert, 1898; Hippoglossoides propinquus Hubbs, 1915

= Bering flounder =

Species of fish

The Bering flounder (Hippoglossoides robustus) is a flatfish of the family Pleuronectidae. It is a demersal fish that lives on bottoms at depths of up to 425 metres (1,394 ft). It reaches up to 30 centimetres (12 in) in length. Its native habitat is the northern Pacific, from Japan and the Sea of Okhotsk across the Bering Sea to Alaska, the Aleutian Islands and Canada's Arctic coast.
