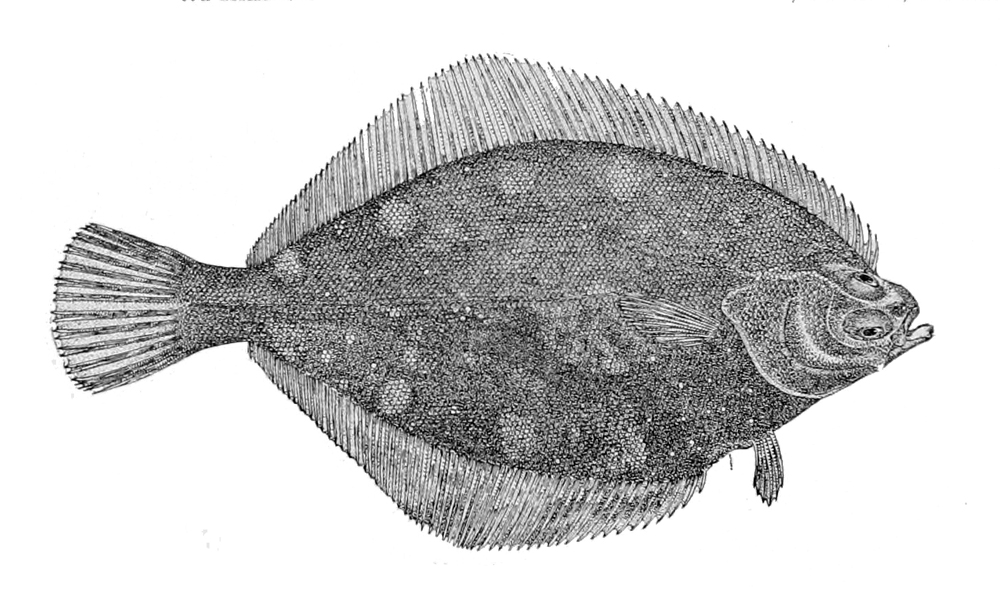

Conservation status
- Least Concern (IUCN 3.1)

Scientific classification
- Kingdom: Animalia
- Phylum: Chordata
- Class: Actinopterygii
- Division: Teleostei
- Order: Carangiformes
- Suborder: Pleuronectoidei
- Family: Pleuronectidae
- Genus: Lepidopsetta
- Species: L. bilineata

Binomial name
- Lepidopsetta bilineata (Ayres, 1855)

Synonyms
- Platessa bilineata Ayres, 1855; Pleuronectes bilineatus (Ayres, 1855); Platichthys umbrosus Girard, 1856; Pleuronectes perarcuatus Cope, 1873

= Rock sole =

Species of fish

The rock sole (Lepidopsetta bilineata), also known as the Pacific rock sole or Southern rock sole, is a flatfish of the family Pleuronectidae. It is a demersal fish that lives on sand and gravel bottoms at depths of up to 575 metres (1,886 ft), though it is most commonly found between 0 and 183 metres (0 and 600 ft). Its native habitat is the temperate waters of the northern Pacific, from Baja California to Alaska, the Aleutian Islands and southeastern parts of the Bering Sea. It grows up to 60 centimetres (24 in) in length and can weigh up to 1.8 kilograms (4.0 lb), and has a maximum recorded lifespan of 22 years.

== Taxonomy and nomenclature ==
Prior to 2000 the Northern rock sole and the rock sole, Lepidopsetta bilineata, were considered to be a single species under the genus Lepidopsetta, but work by Orr & Matarese published in 2000 reorganised the genus into three separate taxa.

As a result of this reclassification and renaming, the rock sole may be referred to as the "southern" rock sole, in order to avoid confusion with the Northern rock sole L. polyxystra.

== Description ==
The rock sole is a right-eyed flounder. Its upper surface is grey to olive to dark brown or black, lighter or darker mottling, and is sometimes marked with yellow or red spots; the underside is light. Its dorsal and anal fins have dark blotches or bars, and near the tail fins may be yellowish. The caudal fin is convex – rounded or broadly v-shaped. It has a small mouth with fleshy lips, and teeth are more strongly developed on the underside.

The rock sole is common from the eastern Bering Sea to central California. They can grow to an overall length of 63.5 cm (25 in).

== Role in ecosystem ==
The rock sole occupies a moderately high trophic level in the food chain.

=== Diet ===
The diet of the rock soles consists mainly of zoobenthos organisms such as molluscs, crustaceans, brittle stars, marine worms and other fish.

=== Predators ===
Rock soles are eaten by marine mammals and other fish, including sharks, Alaska pollock, yellowfin sole, Pacific halibut and Pacific cod.

== Reproduction ==
Rock soles reach reproductive maturity at between 4 and 7 years old, and spawn in winter through to early spring. Eggs are demersal and stick to the surface on which they are laid; hatching takes from 6 to 25 days.

== Commercial fishing ==
The rock sole is fished commercially, and forms an important part of two trawl fisheries in the Bering Sea and Gulf of Alaska. Although it was overfished in the 1960s stocks have recovered, and the biomass of rock sole in the Bering Sea and Aleutian Islands population is now estimated to be very high, at twice the level required to support maximum sustainable yield. In 2008 the estimated rock sole biomass in the Gulf of Alaska fishery was some 161,617 tons, compared to catches ranging from 1,468 tons in 2004 to 4,260 tons in 2007. Alaska accounts for the majority of the worldwide harvest of this fish, catching over 52,000 tons of rock sole in 2008.

Rock sole fishing off the coast of the United States is managed by the Pacific Fishery Management Council and the North Pacific Fishery Management Council, two of eight U.S. Regional Fishery Management Councils.
