= Flathead sole =

Conservation status
- Least Concern (IUCN 3.1)

Scientific classification
- Kingdom: Animalia
- Phylum: Chordata
- Class: Actinopterygii
- Order: Carangiformes
- Suborder: Pleuronectoidei
- Family: Pleuronectidae
- Genus: Hippoglossoides
- Species: H. elassodon

Binomial name
- Hippoglossoides elassodon Jordan & Gilbert, 1880

Species of fish

The flathead sole (Hippoglossoides elassodon) is a flatfish of the family Pleuronectidae. It is a demersal fish that lives on soft, silty or muddy bottoms at depths of up to 1,050 metres (3,440 ft). Its native habitat is the northern Pacific, from the seas of Japan and Okhotsk, across the Bering Sea and to the coast of North America, as far south as Point Reyes, United States. It grows to 52 centimetres (20 in) in length, and can weigh up to 1.56 kilograms (3.4 lb); females are typically larger than males. Lifespan is at least 27 years for females and at least 30 years for males.

== Description ==
The flathead sole is a right-eyed flounder with an oval-shaped body. Its upper surface is dark in colour, olive brown to reddish grey-brown, and may have dusky blotches; its underside is white with translucent areas. The dorsal and anal fins also have dusky blotches. The lateral line curves slightly around the pectoral fin. The upper jaw is narrow in the middle and has one row of teeth.

== Role in ecosystem ==
The flathead sole occupies an intermediate trophic level in the food chain.

=== Diet ===
The flathead sole's diet consists of zoobenthos invertebrates such as clams, worms and brittle stars, as well as fish and squid.

=== Predators ===
The main predators of the flathead sole are the Pacific cod, Alaska pollock, arrowtooth flounder, Greenland turbot and Pacific halibut.

== Commercial fishing ==
The U.S. lands the majority of the world's catch of flathead sole and manages three fisheries - one in the Bering Sea and Aleutian Islands, one in the Gulf of Alaska and one off the West Coast. Commercial fishing is conducted by trawler. Annual catches average around 17,000 tons in the Bering Sea and Aleutian Islands area; in 2008 the Gulf of Alaska catch reached its highest ever level of 3,396 tons. The discard rate for each area is around 10%.

Flathead sole is not currently overfished, and biomass is estimated to be above the level required to support the maximum sustainable yield. In the Bering Sea and Aleutian Islands area, biomass was estimated at 535,356 tons in 2008, down from a peak of almost 800,000 tons in 1997; in the Gulf of Alaska, biomass was estimated at 280,000 tons in 2007, where biomass has fluctuated around an average of 220,000 tons since 1984.
