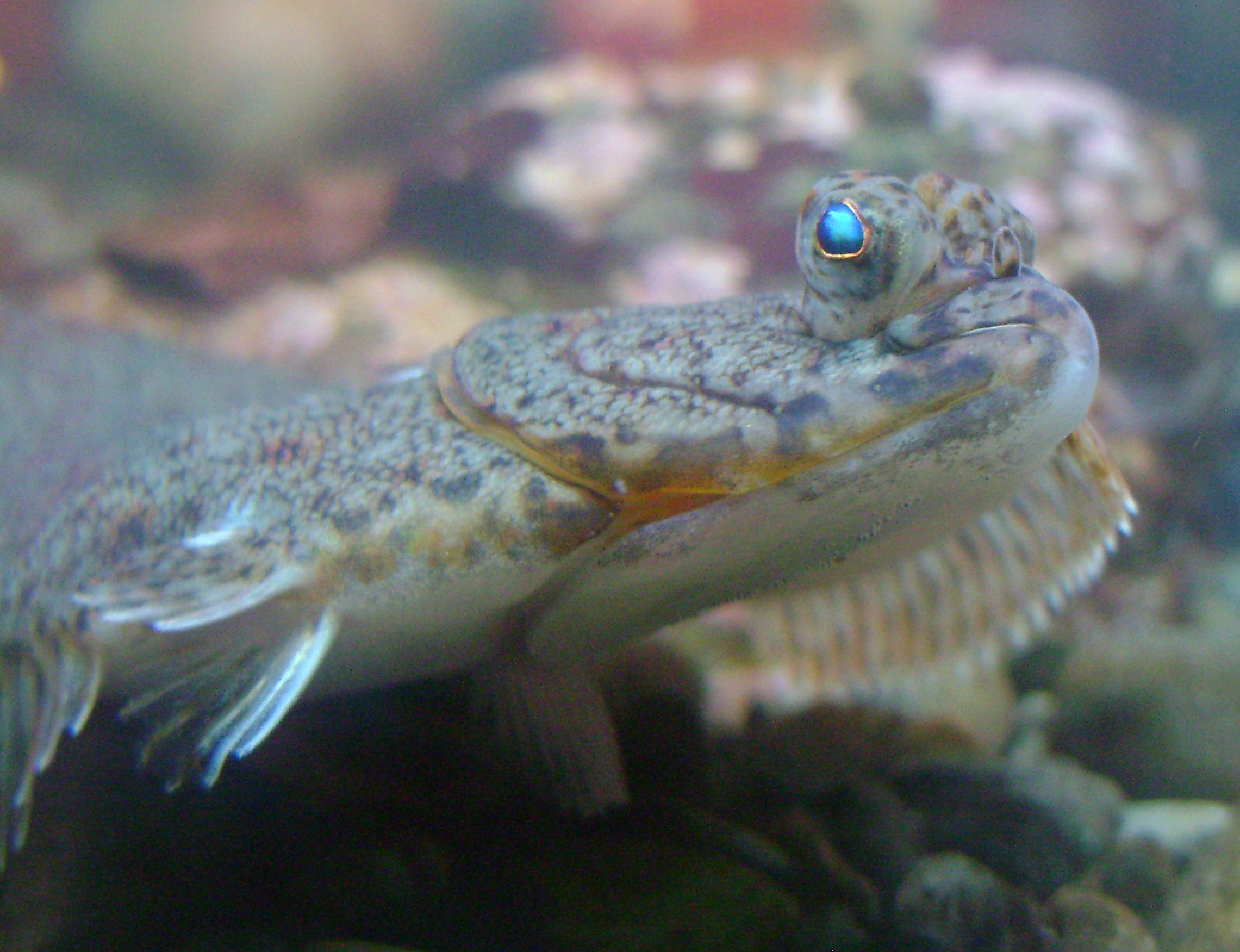

Conservation status
- Endangered (IUCN 3.1)

Scientific classification
- Kingdom: Animalia
- Phylum: Chordata
- Class: Actinopterygii
- Order: Carangiformes
- Suborder: Pleuronectoidei
- Family: Pleuronectidae
- Genus: Hippoglossoides
- Species: H. platessoides

Binomial name
- Hippoglossoides platessoides (O. Fabricius, 1780)

Synonyms
- Pleuronectes limandoides Bloch, 1787; Pleuronectes platessoides O. Fabricius, 1780

= American plaice =

Species of fish

The American plaice, American sole or long rough dab (Hippoglossoides platessoides) is a North Atlantic flatfish that belongs, along with other right-eyed flounders, to the family Pleuronectidae. In the northwest Atlantic (H. p. platessoides) it ranges from Greenland and Labrador to Rhode Island, and in the northeast Atlantic (H. p. limandoides) it ranges from Murmansk to the English Channel, Ireland and Iceland, rarely finding itself in the Baltic Sea. They live on soft bottoms at depths of 10 to 3,000 m (33–9,843 ft), but mainly between 90 and 250 m (300–820 ft).

In the Gulf of Maine spawning peaks in April and May. They grow to a maximum length of 70 centimetres (28 in). The species is considered by the Northwest Atlantic Fisheries Organization to be overfished, with no signs of recovery. Canadian officials dispute this, claiming the population is under less than 20% risk of extinction in the next 80 years however, it remains under the moratorium established in 1993. A 1997 study reports that plaice are endangered in Canada due to overfishing. In its European range, the species is generally common and not actively sought by fishers, but it is often part of the bycatch.

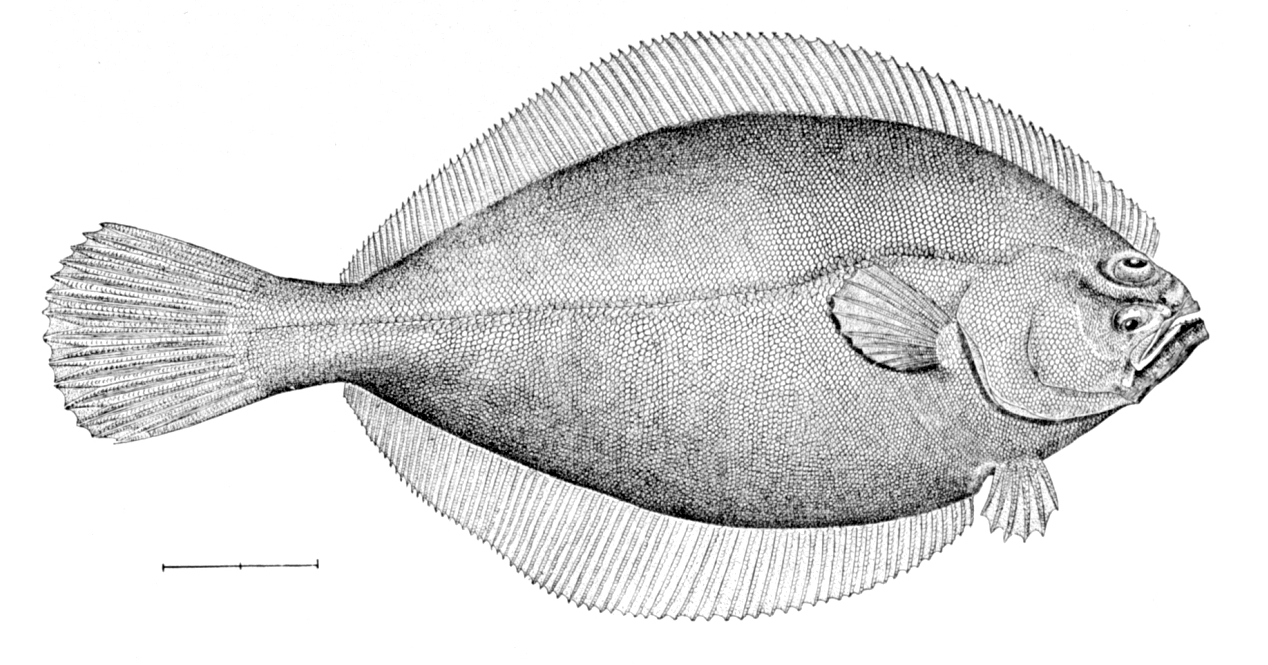

American plaice may be an intermediate host for the nematode parasite Otostrongylus circumlitis, which is a lungworm of seals, primarily affecting animals less than 1 year of age.
