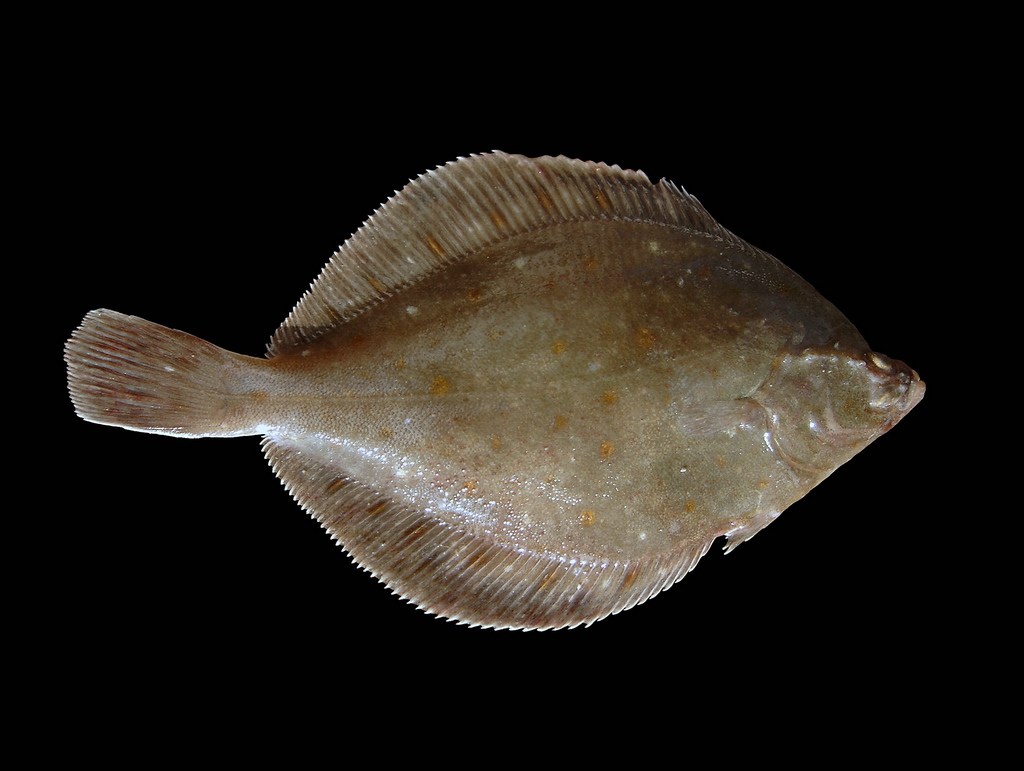
- European plaice (P. platessa)

Scientific classification
- Kingdom: Animalia
- Phylum: Chordata
- Class: Actinopterygii
- Division: Teleostei
- Order: Carangiformes
- Suborder: Pleuronectoidei
- Family: Pleuronectidae
- Subfamily: Pleuronectinae
- Genus: Pleuronectes; Linnaeus, 1758

Type species
- Pleuronectes platessa Linnaeus, 1758

Synonyms
- Leptosoma Nardo, 1827; Platessa Cuvier, 1816; Spanius Gistel, 1848

= Pleuronectes =

Pleuronectes Temporal range: Miocene–present

Genus of fishes

Pleuronectes is a genus of righteye flounders found in the northern oceans.

There are currently two recognized species in this genus:

- Pleuronectes platessa Linnaeus, 1758 (European plaice)
- Pleuronectes quadrituberculatus Pallas, 1814 (Alaska plaice)

The following fossil species are also known:

- †Pleuronectes sonei (Shikama, 1964) (Miocene of Japan)
