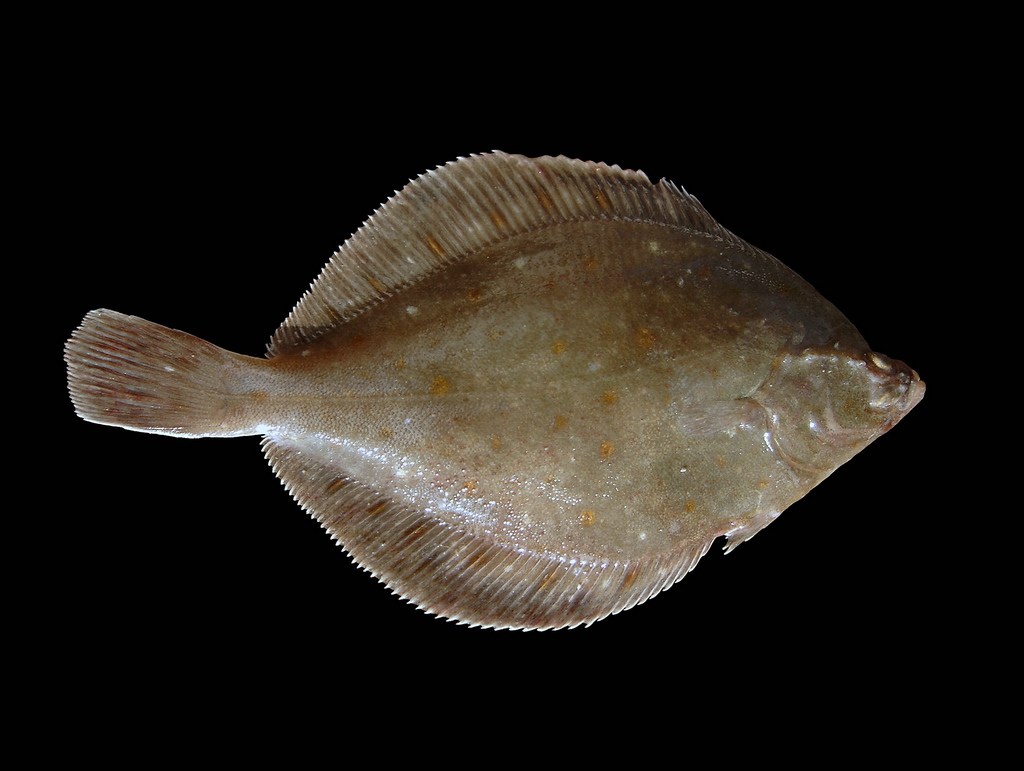

Conservation status
- Least Concern (IUCN 3.1)

Scientific classification
- Kingdom: Animalia
- Phylum: Chordata
- Class: Actinopterygii
- Division: Teleostei
- Order: Carangiformes
- Suborder: Pleuronectoidei
- Family: Pleuronectidae
- Genus: Pleuronectes
- Species: P. platessa

Binomial name
- Pleuronectes platessa Linnaeus, 1758

Synonyms
- Platessa latus Cuvier, 1829; Platessa platessa (Linnaeus, 1758); Platessa vulgaris Cloquet, 1826; Pleuronectes borealis Faber, 1828; Pleuronectes latus Cuvier, 1829

= European plaice =

Species of fish

The European plaice (Pleuronectes platessa), commonly referred to as simply plaice, or schol in Dutch, is a species of marine flatfish in the genus Pleuronectes of the family Pleuronectidae.

== Description ==
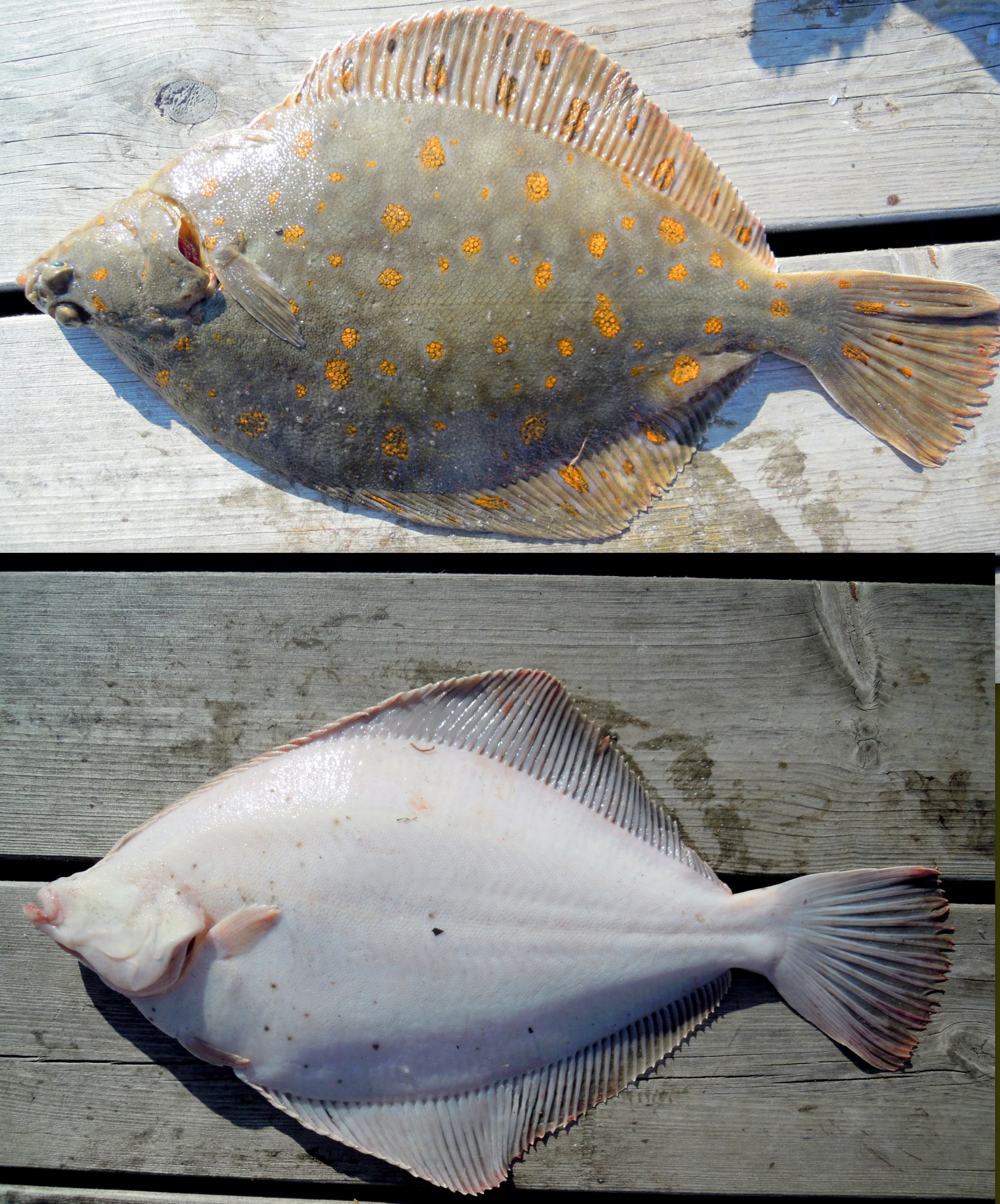
Dorsal and ventral side

The European plaice is characterized, on their dorsal side, by their dark green to dark brown skin, blotched with conspicuous, but irregularly distributed, orange spots. The ventral side is pearly white. The skin is smooth with small scales. They are able to adapt their colour somewhat to match that of their surroundings, but the orange spots always remain visible. The skin lacks any prickles.

The outline of adults is oval. The head is rather small and is less than 25% of the total length. The pointed mouth is terminal and fairly small with its maxilla reaching just below the right eye. Both eyes are located at the right side of the body. The bony ridge behind the eyes is another characteristic for this species. The lateral line curves slightly above the pectoral fin. The dorsal fin reaches the eye. The dorsal and anal fins are distant from the caudal fin. The anal fin contains 48 to 59 soft rays and is preceded by a spine. The dorsal fin has 65 to 79 soft rays, the pectoral fin 10 to 11, and the ventral fin six.

European plaice can live up to 20 years and will reach its maximum size at about 50 to 70 cm but individuals up to 78 cm and 5.7 kg have been observed.

== Distribution and habitat ==
European plaice is a common flatfish which inhabits sandy and muddy bottoms of the European shelf, usually at depths between 10 and 200 m. It is found from the Barents Sea down to the Iberian peninsula and around Iceland and the Faroe Islands. It is often reported in ichthyological check lists for the Mediterranean Sea but this is likely to be misidentified specimens of European flounder.

Adult fish are generally found in deeper waters whereas young fish are found in shallow waters e.g. estuaries and sandy coasts. Plaice tend to burrow in the sediment during the day and remain stationary for long periods to avoid predators and ambush prey.

== Diet ==
It is active at night and feeds on polychaetes, crustaceans and bivalves. Young plaice (between 1 and 2 years old) tend to consume mainly shrimps.

== Lifecycle ==
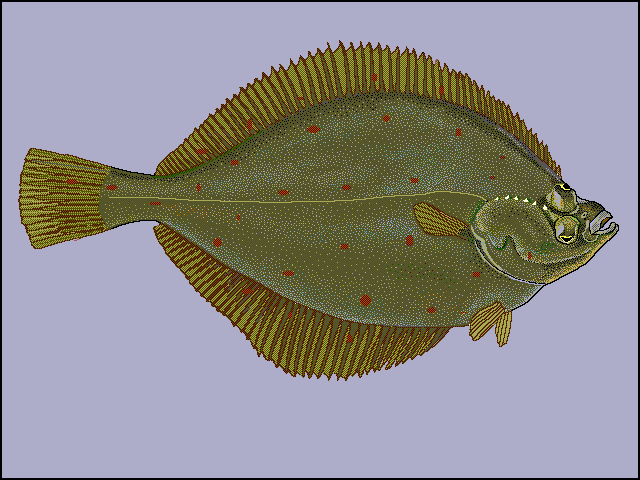
Drawing of a plaice

The main spawning grounds in the North Sea are located in the Southern Bight and in the eastern English Channel. Plaice are determinate spawners in which fecundity is determined before the onset of spawning. Females mature, i.e. are able to spawn, at ages from 3 to 7 years. However, in the North Sea, most females mature at 3 years. Ovary development begins around late August to September with the spawning being from December to May. Each female releases eggs in batches every 3 to 5 days for around a month.

The eggs hatch after about two weeks and drift passively in the plankton. The larvae drift in the plankton and metamorphose after about 8 to 10 weeks, dependent on temperature, at which time they settle in the intertidal zone of sandy beaches. The larvae exhibit what is sometimes called semiactive tidal transport. As the larvae cannot swim against the prevailing currents, they make use of their ability to alter their vertical position in the water column to ensure they are transported to suitable habitat. On incoming or flood tides (water level is rising), the larvae move up into the water column and are thus transported towards land. On the outgoing or ebb tides (water level is falling), the larvae move down the water column and are not transported away from the intertidal by the tidal currents.

When the larvae have reached a suitable site for settlement, the metamorphosis to the asymmetric body shape takes place. This can take up to 10 days.

Recently transformed juveniles settle onto shallow intertidal beaches. The very youngest juveniles will, for a period of up to a week, strand themselves in very shallow pools on the intertidal once the tide has receded. The reasons for this behaviour are not clear. During the first year of life (when the fish are called 0+ group), the juveniles will stay in these shallow intertidal habitats for up to 7 months (depending on latitude and/or temperature), before migrating to deeper waters. Some of these fish will return the next year (when they are I+ group) and even fewer when they are II+ group; however, the majority of juveniles do not return after they have migrated during their first year.

== Fisheries ==
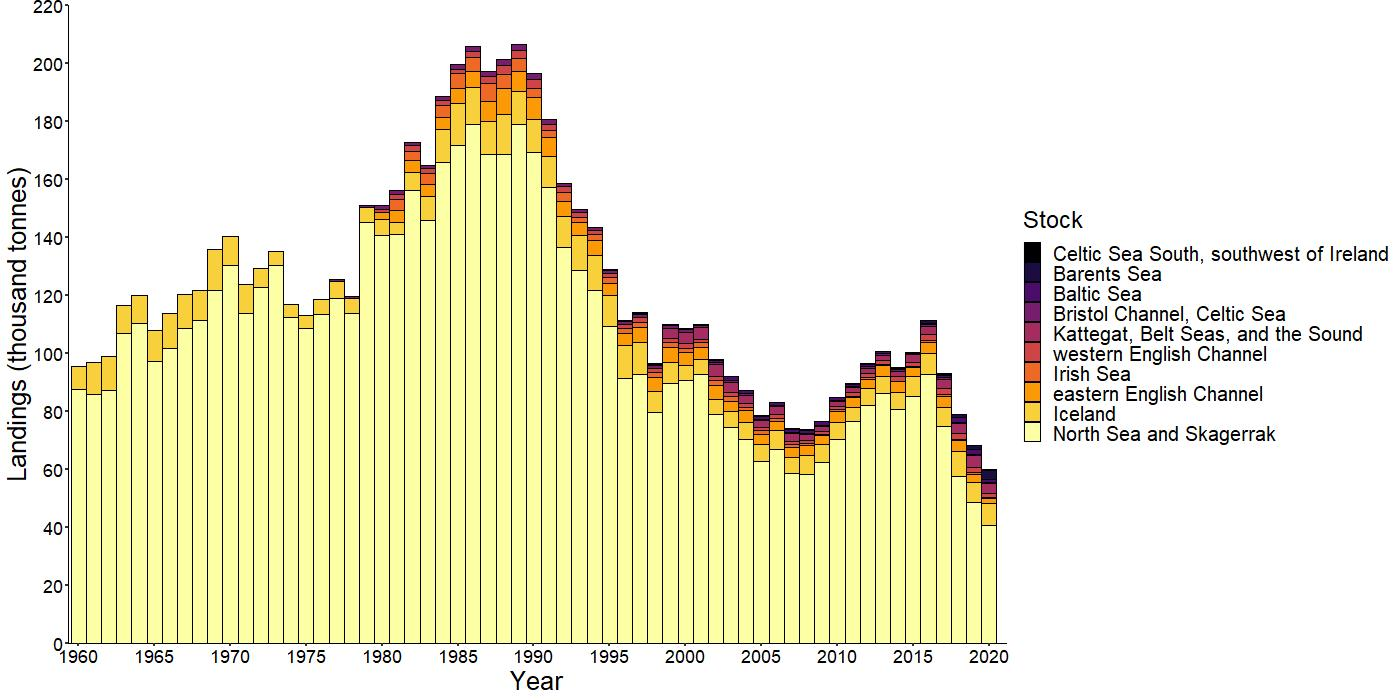
Reported landings of Pleuronectes platessa from 1960 to 2020 by ICES defined stocks

European plaice are generally caught as part of a mixed flatfish fishery or in other groundfish fisheries. The most common gears used in these fisheries are beam trawls, otter trawls and Danish seine. It is also caught in other fishing gears such as bottom set gillnets, longlines and hand lines. The majority of landings of European plaice are caught in the North Sea. Total landings peaked in 1985–1990 when approximately 200 thousand tonnes were landed, current landings are generally less than 120 thousand tonnes.

After a period of time in the 1980s and 1990s where landings exceeded management advice for several stocks, the fishing pressure has been reduced and the status of the stocks has improved and all the stocks are considered to be within safe biological limits as defined by ICES.

== As a food ==
Plaice is sometimes used as the fish in fish and chips, in countries where the dish is popular.

In North German and Danish cuisine, plaice is one of the most commonly eaten fishes. Filleted, battered, and pan-fried plaice is popular hot or cold as an open sandwich topping together with remoulade sauce and lemon slices. Battered plaice can also be served hot with french fries and remoulade sauce as a main dish; this fish and chips variant is commonly available as a children's special in Danish restaurants. Breaded frozen plaice, ready to be baked or fried at home, is readily available in supermarkets. Fresh plaice is also oven-baked.
