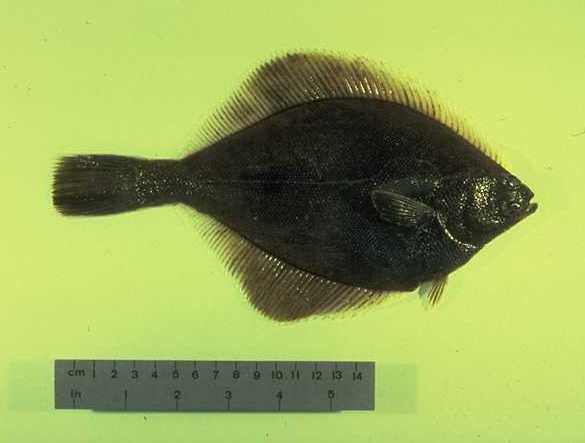

Conservation status
- Least Concern (IUCN 3.1)

Scientific classification
- Kingdom: Animalia
- Phylum: Chordata
- Class: Actinopterygii
- Division: Teleostei
- Order: Carangiformes
- Suborder: Pleuronectoidei
- Family: Pleuronectidae
- Genus: Limanda
- Species: L. aspera

Binomial name
- Limanda aspera (Pallas, 1814)

Synonyms
- Pleuronectes asper Pallas, 1814; Limanda asprella Hubbs, 1915

= Yellowfin sole =

Species of fish

The yellowfin sole (Limanda aspera) is a flatfish of the family Pleuronectidae. It is a demersal fish that lives on soft, sandy bottoms at depths of up to 700 metres (2,300 ft), though it is most commonly found at depths of around 91 metres (299 ft). Its native habitat is the temperate waters of the northern Pacific, from Korea and the Sea of Japan to the Sea of Okhotsk, the Bering Sea and Barkley Sound on the west coast of Canada. Males grow up to 49 cm (19 in) in length, though the common length is around 33.5 cm (13.2 in). The maximum recorded weight is 1.7 kg (3.7 lb), and the maximum recorded lifespan is 26 years.

== Description ==
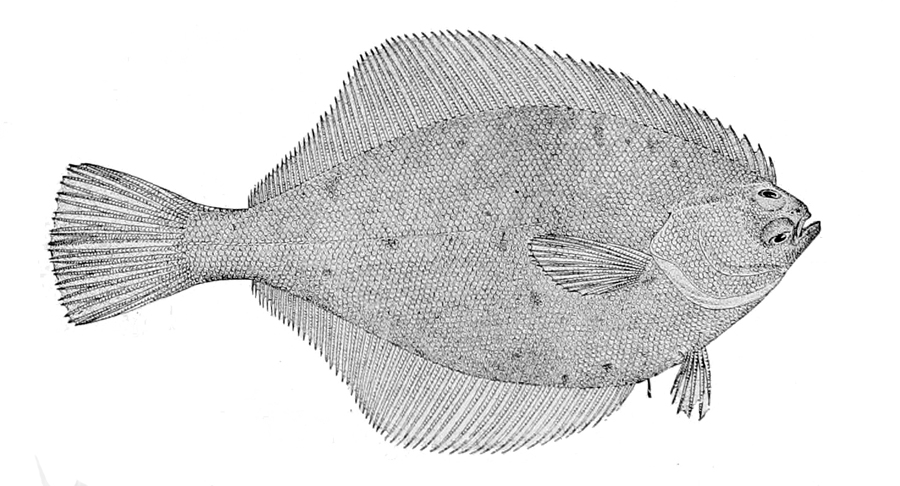
From the Bulletin of the United States Fish Commission (1906)

The yellowfin sole has a deep body, with a small mouth, moderately large and closely situated eyes, and a slightly pronounced snout. The upper side of the body is olive to brown in colour, with dark mottling, and dorsal and anal fins are yellowish on both sides of the body, with faint dark bars and a narrow dark line at the base. Scales are rough on both sides of the body.

== Taxonomy ==
The yellowfin sole was originally described as Pleuronectes asper by Pallas in 1814, and subsequently as Limanda asprella by Hubbs in 1915.

== Role in ecosystem ==
The yellowfin sole occupies a moderately high trophic level in the food chain. The diet of the yellowfin sole consists mainly of zoobenthic organisms, including polychaetes and amphipods such as hydroids, worms, mollusks, and brittle stars. Yellowfin sole are known to be prey fish for sculpin, Pacific halibut, Pacific cod, and arrowtooth flounder.

== Reproduction ==
Female yellowfin sole reach reproductive maturity when they reach around 30 cm (12 in) in length (usually around 10.5 years old), and spawn following migration to shallow waters during spring and summer. Yellowfin sole have high reproductive potential, with females producing 1 to 3 million eggs.

== Commercial fishing ==
Global capture production of Yellowfin sole (Limanda aspera) in thousand tonnes from 1970 to 2022, as reported by the FAO

Yellowfin sole is fished commercially, primarily by demersal trawl fishing. Having recovered from high fishing rates in the 1960s and 1970s, it is currently not considered to be overfished, and the biomass of yellowfin sole in the Bering Sea is estimated to be high and stable, above its target level. Catch has averaged 94,000 tons from 1998 to 2010, with the 2008 catch of 148,894 tons representing the highest annual catch in 11 years. Landings are limited by crab and halibut bycatch limits. As of 2021 there were two MSC certified commercial fisheries in the northern Pacific.

It is additionally the subject of a fishery off of Sakhalin Island, where population fluctuations associated with cyclic change in water temperature have been amplified by overexploitation in the first two decades of the 2000s, prompting regulatory changes in 2014.
