= List of fishes of Alaska =

Alaska has a large diversity of marine and freshwater fish found in its waters. the following is a list of species, both native and introduced

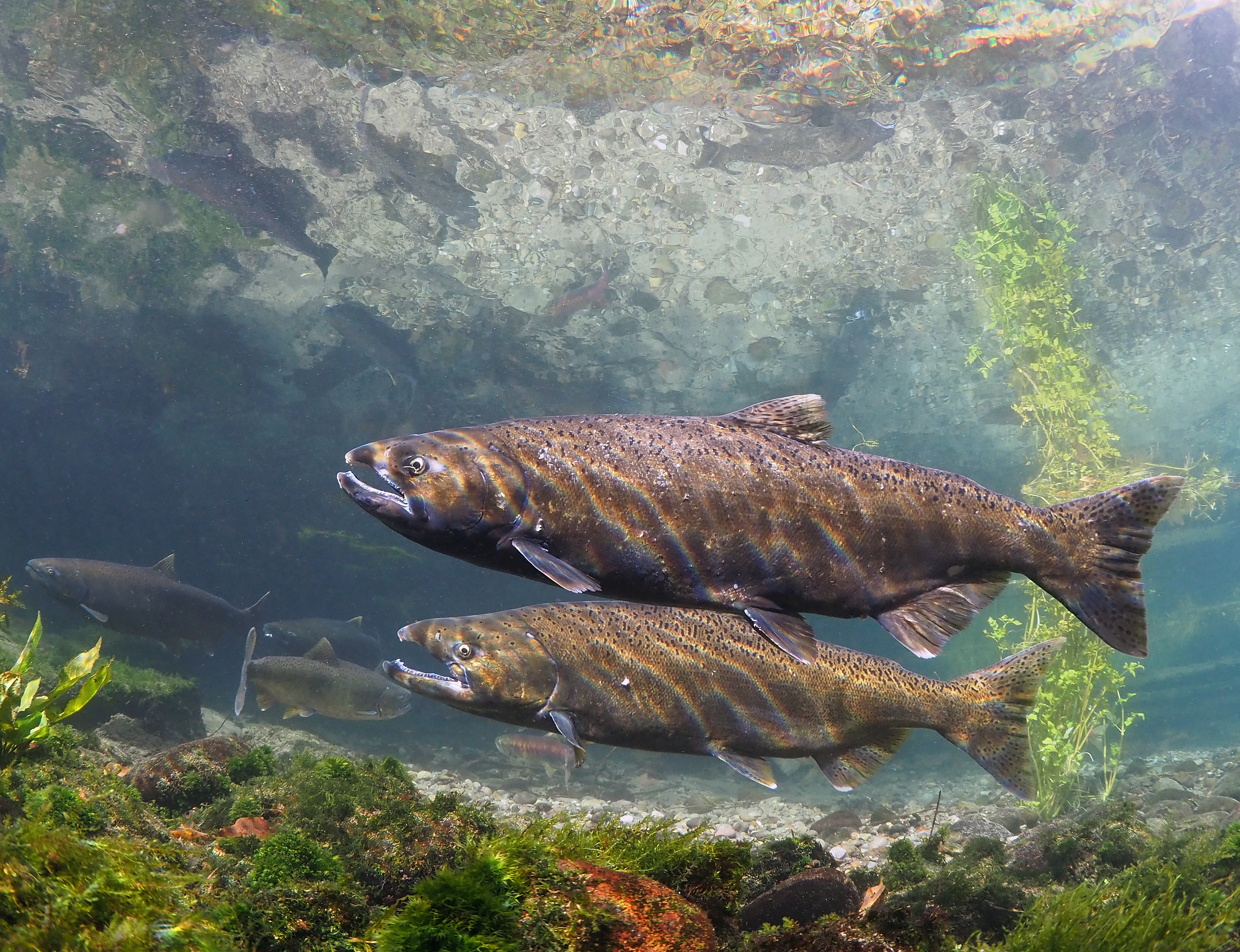
the King salmon is Alaska's state fish

== Native Species ==
=== Class Petromyzonti (Lampreys) ===
==== Family Petromyzontidae (Northern Lampreys) ====
- Genus Entosphenus
  - Entosphenus tridentatus (Pacific Lamprey)
- Genus Lethenteron
  - Lethenteron camtschaticum (Arctic Lamprey)

=== Class Chondrichthyes (Cartilaginous Fish) ===
==== Family Rajidae (Skates) ====
- Genus Bathyraja
  - Bathyraja abyssicola (Deepsea Skate)
  - Bathyraja aleutica (Aleutian Skate)
  - Bathyraja interrupta (Sandpaper Skate)
  - Bathyraja maculata (Whiteblotched Skate)
  - Bathyraja matsubarai (Dusky-purple Skate)
  - Bathyraja minispinosa (Smallthorn Skate)
  - Bathyraja parmifera (Alaska Skate)
  - Bathyraja taranetzi (Mud Skate)
- Genus Raja
  - Raja binoculata (Big Skate)
  - Raja rhina (Longnose Skate)

==== Family Squalidae (Dogfish Sharks) ====
- Genus Squalus
  - Squalus suckleyi (Pacific Spiny Dogfish)

==== Family Somniosidae (Sleeper Sharks) ====
- Genus Somniosus
  - Somniosus pacificus (Pacific Sleeper Shark)

==== Family Lamnidae (Mackerel Sharks) ====
- Genus Lamna
  - Lamna ditropis (Salmon Shark)
- Genus Carcharodon
  - Carcharodon carcharias (Great White Shark) — Rare visitor
- Genus Cetorhinus
  - Cetorhinus maximus (Basking Shark) — Seasonal visitor

==== Family Carcharhinidae (Requiem Sharks) ====
- Genus Prionace
  - Prionace glauca (Blue Shark)

==== Family Alopiidae (Thresher Sharks) ====
- Genus Alopias
  - Alopias vulpinus (Common Thresher Shark)

==== Family Chimaeridae (Ghost Sharks) ====
- Genus Hydrolagus
  - Hydrolagus colliei (Spotted Ratfish) — Southeastern Alaska

=== Class Actinopterygii (Ray-Finned Fishes) ===
==== Family Acipenseridae (Sturgeons) ====
- Genus Acipenser
  - Acipenser medirostris (Green Sturgeon) — Rare, southeastern Alaska
  - Acipenser transmontanus (White Sturgeon)

==== Family Clupeidae (Herrings) ====
- Genus Clupea
  - Clupea pallasii (Pacific Herring)

==== Family Salmonidae (Salmon, Trout, Chars, and Whitefish) ====
- Genus Oncorhynchus
  - Oncorhynchus gorbuscha (Pink Salmon)
  - Oncorhynchus keta (Chum Salmon)
  - Oncorhynchus kisutch (Coho Salmon)
  - Oncorhynchus nerka (Sockeye Salmon)
  - Oncorhynchus tshawytscha (Chinook Salmon)
  - Oncorhynchus mykiss (Rainbow Trout / Steelhead) — Primarily in Southeast and South Central
- Genus Salvelinus
  - Salvelinus malma (Dolly Varden)
  - Salvelinus alpinus (Arctic Char)
  - Salvelinus confluentus (Bull Trout) — Southeastern Alaska
- Genus Prosopium
  - Prosopium cylindraceum (Round Whitefish)
  - Prosopium williamsoni (Mountain Whitefish)
- Genus Coregonus (Whitefishes and Ciscos)
  - Coregonus autumnalis (Arctic Cisco)
  - Coregonus laurettae (Bering Cisco)
  - Coregonus nasus (Broad Whitefish)
  - Coregonus nelsonii (Alaska Whitefish)
  - Coregonus pidschian (Humpback Whitefish)
  - Coregonus sardinella (Least Cisco)
- Genus Thymallus
  - Thymallus arcticus (Arctic grayling)
- Genus Stenodus
  - Stenodus leucichthys (Sheefish / Inconnu)

==== Family Osmeridae (Smelts) ====
- Genus Hypomesus
  - Hypomesus pretiosus (Surf Smelt)
  - Hypomesus transpacificus (Delta Smelt) — Yukon River drainage
- Genus Mallotus
  - Mallotus villosus (Capelin)
- Genus Osmerus
  - Osmerus mordax (Rainbow Smelt)
- Genus Spirinchus
  - Spirinchus thaleichthys (Longfin Smelt)
- Genus Thaleichthys
  - Thaleichthys pacificus (Eulachon / Hooligan)

==== Family Gadidae (Cods) ====
- Genus Gadus
  - Gadus macrocephalus (Pacific Cod)
  - Gadus chalcogrammus (Walleye Pollock)
- Genus Arctogadus
  - Arctogadus glacialis (Arctic Cod)
- Genus Boreogadus
  - Boreogadus saida (Polar Cod)
- Genus Eleginus
  - Eleginus gracilis (Saffron Cod)
- Genus Microgadus
  - Microgadus proximus (Pacific Tomcod)
- Genus Lota
  - Lota lota (Burbot)

==== Family Pleuronectidae (Righteye Flounders) ====
- Genus Hippoglossus
  - Hippoglossus stenolepis (Pacific Halibut)
- Genus Atheresthes
  - Atheresthes evermanni (Kamchatka Flounder)
  - Atheresthes stomias (Arrowtooth Flounder)
- Genus Reinhardtius
  - Reinhardtius hippoglossoides (Greenland Turbot)
- Genus Platichthys
  - Platichthys stellatus (Starry Flounder)
- Genus Lepidopsetta
  - Lepidopsetta bilineata (Rock Sole)
  - Lepidopsetta polyxystra (Northern Rock Sole)
- Genus Pleuronectes
  - Pleuronectes quadrituberculatus (Alaska Plaice)
- Genus Limanda
  - Limanda aspera (Yellowfin Sole)
  - Limanda proboscidea (Longhead Dab)
- Genus Glyptocephalus
  - Glyptocephalus zachirus (Rex Sole)
- Genus Lyopsetta
  - Lyopsetta exilis (Slender Sole)

==== Family Hexagrammidae (Greenlings) ====
- Genus Hexagrammos
  - Hexagrammos decagrammus (Kelp Greenling)
  - Hexagrammos lagocephalus (Rock Greenling)
  - Hexagrammos octogrammus (Masked Greenling)
  - Hexagrammos stelleri (Whitespotted Greenling)
- Genus Ophiodon
  - Ophiodon elongatus (Lingcod)
- Genus Pleurogrammus
  - Pleurogrammus monopterygius (Atka Mackerel)

==== Family Scorpaenidae (Scorpionfishes) ====
- Genus Sebastes (Rockfishes)
  - Sebastes alutus (Pacific Ocean Perch)
  - Sebastes aurora (Aurora Rockfish)
  - Sebastes babcocki (Redbanded Rockfish)
  - Sebastes borealis (Shortraker Rockfish)
  - Sebastes brevispinis (Silvergray Rockfish)
  - Sebastes caurinus (Copper Rockfish)
  - Sebastes crameri (Darkblotched Rockfish)
  - Sebastes diploproa (Splitnose Rockfish)
  - Sebastes elongatus (Greenstriped Rockfish)
  - Sebastes entomelas (Widow Rockfish)
  - Sebastes flavidus (Yellowtail Rockfish)
  - Sebastes helvomaculatus (Rosethorn Rockfish)
  - Sebastes maliger (Quillback Rockfish)
  - Sebastes melanops (Black Rockfish)
  - Sebastes melanostomus (Blackgill Rockfish)
  - Sebastes mentella (Deepwater Redfish)
  - Sebastes miniatus (Vermilion Rockfish)
  - Sebastes mystinus (Blue Rockfish)
  - Sebastes nebulosus (China Rockfish)
  - Sebastes nigrocinctus (Tiger Rockfish)
  - Sebastes paucispinis (Bocaccio)
  - Sebastes polyspinis (Northern Rockfish)
  - Sebastes proriger (Redstripe Rockfish)
  - Sebastes reedi (Yellowmouth Rockfish)
  - Sebastes ruberrimus (Yelloweye Rockfish)
  - Sebastes variegatus (Harlequin Rockfish)
  - Sebastes variabilis (Dusky Rockfish)
  - Sebastes zacentrus (Sharpchin Rockfish)
- Genus Sebastolobus (Thornyheads)
  - Sebastolobus alascanus (Shortspine Thornyhead)
  - Sebastolobus altivelis (Longspine Thornyhead)

==== Family Cottidae (Sculpins) ====
- Genus Myoxocephalus
  - Myoxocephalus jaok (Plain Sculpin)
  - Myoxocephalus polyacanthocephalus (Great Sculpin)
  - Myoxocephalus scorpius (Shorthorn Sculpin)
  - Myoxocephalus verrucosus (Warthead Sculpin)
- Genus Hemilepidotus
  - Hemilepidotus hemilepidotus (Red Irish Lord)
  - Hemilepidotus jordani (Yellow Irish Lord)
  - Hemilepidotus papilio (Butterfly Sculpin)
  - Hemilepidotus spinosus (Brown Irish Lord)
- Genus Gymnocanthus
  - Gymnocanthus pistilliger (Naked Sandfish)
  - Gymnocanthus tricuspis (Arctic Staghorn Sculpin)
- Genus Icelus
  - Icelus bicornis (Twohorn Sculpin)
  - Icelus spatula (Spatulate Sculpin)
  - Icelus spiniger (Thorny Sculpin)
- Genus Artediellus
  - Artediellus pacificus (Hookhorn Sculpin)
- Genus Enophrys
  - Enophrys bison (Buffalo Sculpin)
  - Enophrys lucasi (Leister Sculpin)
- Genus Megalocottus
  - Megalocottus platycephalus (Belligerent Sculpin)
- Genus Scorpaenichthys
  - Scorpaenichthys marmoratus (Cabezon)
- Genus Triglops
  - Triglops macellus (Roughspine Sculpin)
  - Triglops metopias (Scissortail Sculpin)
  - Triglops pingelii (Ribbed Sculpin)

==== Family Anoplopomatidae (Sablefishes) ====
- Genus Anoplopoma
  - Anoplopoma fimbria (Sablefish / Black Cod)
- Genus Erilepis
  - Erilepis zonifer (Skilfish)

==== Family Zoarcidae (Eelpouts) ====
- Genus Lycodes
  - Lycodes brevipes (Shortfin Eelpout)
  - Lycodes diapterus (Black Eelpout)
  - Lycodes palearis (Wattled Eelpout)
  - Lycodes pacificus (Blackbelly Eelpout)
  - Lycodes raridens (Marbled Eelpout)
- Genus Lycodapus
  - Lycodapus mandibularis (Pale Eelpout)
- Genus Bothrocara
  - Bothrocara molle (Soft Eelpout)
- Genus Zoarces
  - Zoarces americanus (Ocean Pout) — Rare in AK

==== Family Stichaeidae (Pricklebacks) ====
- Genus Lumpenus
  - Lumpenus fabricii (Slender Eelblenny)
  - Lumpenus medius (Stout Eelblenny)
- Genus Anisarchus
  - Anisarchus medius (Stout Eelblenny)
- Genus Leptoclinus
  - Leptoclinus maculatus (Daubed Shanny)
- Genus Chirolophis
  - Chirolophis nugator (Mosshead Warbonnet)
  - Chirolophis polyactocephalus (Decorated Warbonnet)
- Genus Plectobranchus
  - Plectobranchus evides (Bluebarred Prickleback)

==== Family Pholidae (Gunnels) ====
- Genus Pholis
  - Pholis laeta (Crescent Gunnel)
  - Pholis ornata (Saddleback Gunnel)
- Genus Apodichthys
  - Apodichthys fucorum (Rockweed Gunnel)

==== Family Liparidae (Snailfishes) ====
- Genus Liparis
  - Liparis cyclopus (Ribbon Snailfish)
  - Liparis dennyi (Marbled Snailfish)
  - Liparis fucensis (Slipskin Snailfish)
  - Liparis gibbus (Polka-dot Snailfish)
- Genus Paraliparis
  - Paraliparis cephalus (Pearly Snailfish)
  - Paraliparis deani (Paddle Snailfish)

==== Family Cyclopteridae (Lumpfishes) ====
- Genus Cyclopteropsis
  - Cyclopteropsis inarmatus (Smooth Lumpfish)
- Genus Eumicrotremus
  - Eumicrotremus orbis (Pacific Spiny Lumpsucker)
  - Eumicrotremus phrynoides (Toad Lumpsucker)
- Genus Aptocyclus
  - Aptocyclus ventricosus (Smooth Lumpsucker)

== Introduced Species ==
Due to Alaska's focus on managing its pristine native fisheries, introductions are rare and typically discouraged. A few species have been introduced to specific lakes for sport fishing.

- Genus Salvelinus
  - Salvelinus fontinalis (Brook Trout)
  - Salvelinus namaycush (Lake Trout)
- Genus Oncorhynchus
  - Oncorhynchus aguabonita (Golden Trout) — Stocked in isolated high-elevation lakes
- Genus Salmo
  - Salmo trutta (Brown Trout) — Very rare introductions
