= Grubby (disambiguation) =

Grubby may refer to:

== People ==
- Grubby, Dutch gamer and streamer
- A nickname of World War One American aviator Greayer Clover

== Animals ==
- Grubby (opossum) (2022–2025), an invasive opossum in Alaska
- Myoxocephalus aenaeus, a type of sculpin fish

== Other ==
- Grubby Hands Limited, a video game developer
