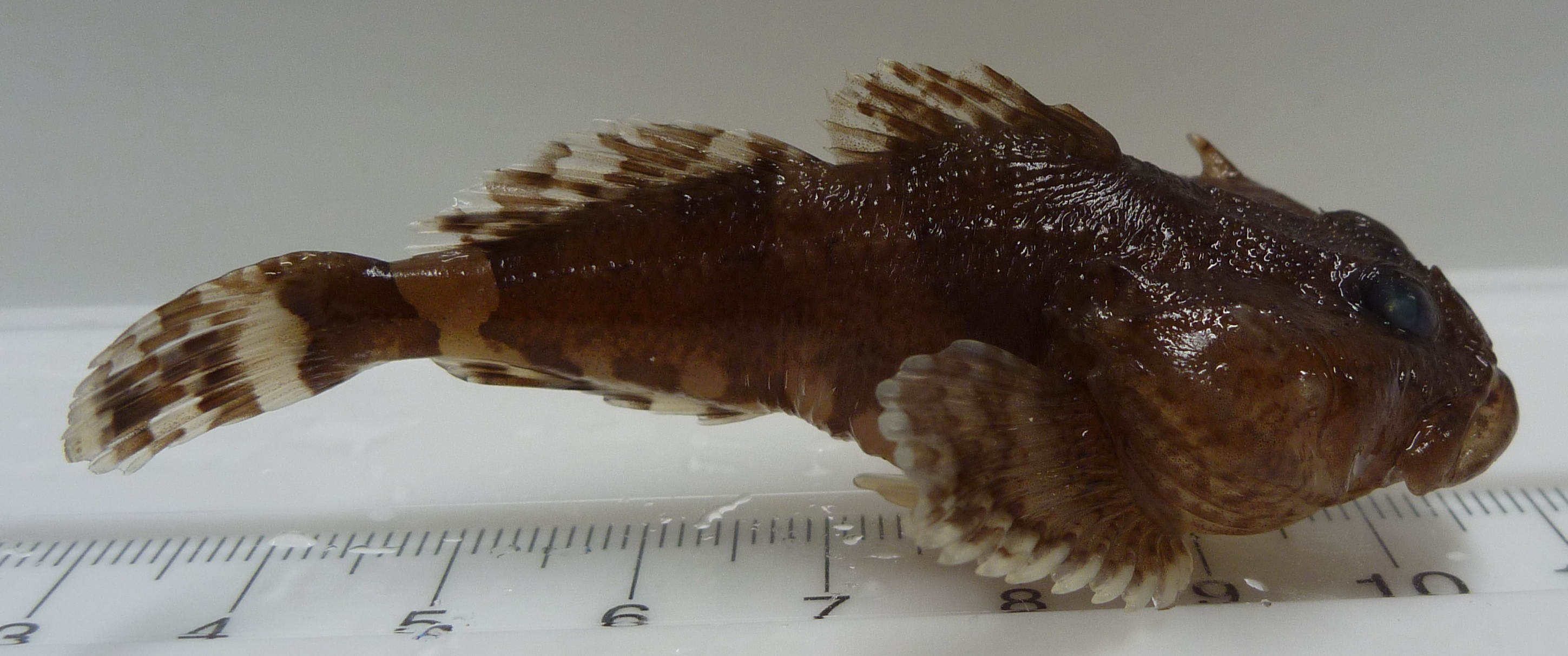
- Juvenile Myoxocephalus scorpioides

Scientific classification
- Kingdom: Animalia
- Phylum: Chordata
- Class: Actinopterygii
- Order: Perciformes
- Suborder: Cottoidei
- Family: Psychrolutidae
- Genus: Myoxocephalus
- Species: M. scorpioides

Binomial name
- Myoxocephalus scorpioides (O. Fabricius, 1780)

Synonyms
- Cottus scorpioides O. Fabricius, 1780; Boreocottus axillaris Gill, 1859; Cottus axillaris (Gill, 1859); Myoxocephalus axillaris (Gill, 1859)

= Myoxocephalus scorpioides =

Species of fish

Myoxocephalus scorpioides, the Arctic sculpin or northern sculpin, is a species of marine ray-finned fish belonging to the family Cottidae, the typical sculpins. This fish is found in the Arctic Ocean.

== Taxonomy ==
Myoxocephalus scorpioides was first formally described in 1780 as Cottus scoprpioides by the Danish missionary and naturalist Otto Fabricius with its type locality given as Western Greenland. The specific name scorpioides was not explained by Fabricius but most likely alludes to the similarity to Myoxocephalus scorpius.

== Description ==
Myoxocephalus scorpioides has dorsal fins which are supported by 8 or 9 spines and between 14 and 17 soft rays while the anal fin has between 11 and 13 soft rays. The head and body are slightly compressed, but widest towards the head with tentacles on the parts of head behind the eyes. There are 3 spines on the preoperculum, the middle spine being half the length of the top spine. This top spine does not extend to the margin of the operculum and so is comparatively short when compared with most congeners. The caudal peduncle is long and slender and the caudal fin is rounded. The body above the lateral line has scattered plates with many small spines and elevated centres with a few small scattered plates underneath the lateral line. The lateral line has its pores arranged in 3 rows. The overall colour is dark olive to blackish-brown marked with darker mottles or bands. The males have the pectoral fins marked with distinct white spots, while in females they have dark bands. The males also have dark-margined white or silvery spots below the pectoral fins and over the anal fin, dark spots on the breast, lower lip, and have a reddish-orange belly, which is broken by a wide white stripe extending from the pelvic fins to the anal fin. This species attains a maximum published total length of 22 cm (8.7 in).

== Distribution and habitat ==
Myoxocephalus scorpioides is found in the Arctic Ocean from the East Siberian Sea east through the Arctic Ocean of North America as far as Western Greenland south to Hudson Bay and James Bay, the Strait of Belle Isle and the Gulf of St Lawrence. It is also found in the Bering Sea coasts south to Bristol Bay and the Gulf of Anadyr. It is afound in shallow intertidal waters, down to 25 m (82 ft), rartely 40 m (130 ft), typically on rocky substrates among Fucus seaweeds. Juveniles are frequently recorded near the discharges of freshwater streams in the intertidal zone.

== Biology ==
Myoxocephalus scorpioides is a predator of benthic crustaceans. Spawning takes place in the autumn and the eggs, which have a diameter of 1.3 mm (0.051 in), are demersal. This species has the ability to synthesize antifreeze proteins, allowing it to withstand temperatures as low as −2 °C (28 °F). It serves as the host for Haemobaphes cyclopterina, a parasitic species of copepod.
