= Myoxocephalus ochotensis =

Scientific classification
- Kingdom: Animalia
- Phylum: Chordata
- Class: Actinopterygii
- Order: Perciformes
- Suborder: Cottoidei
- Family: Psychrolutidae
- Genus: Myoxocephalus
- Species: M. ochotensis

Binomial name
- Myoxocephalus ochotensis P. J. Schmidt, 1929

Species of fish

Myoxocephalus ochotensis is a species of marine ray-finned fish belonging to the family Cottidae, the typical sculpins. It is native to the northwest Pacific in the Sea of Okhotsk. Very little is known about this species.
