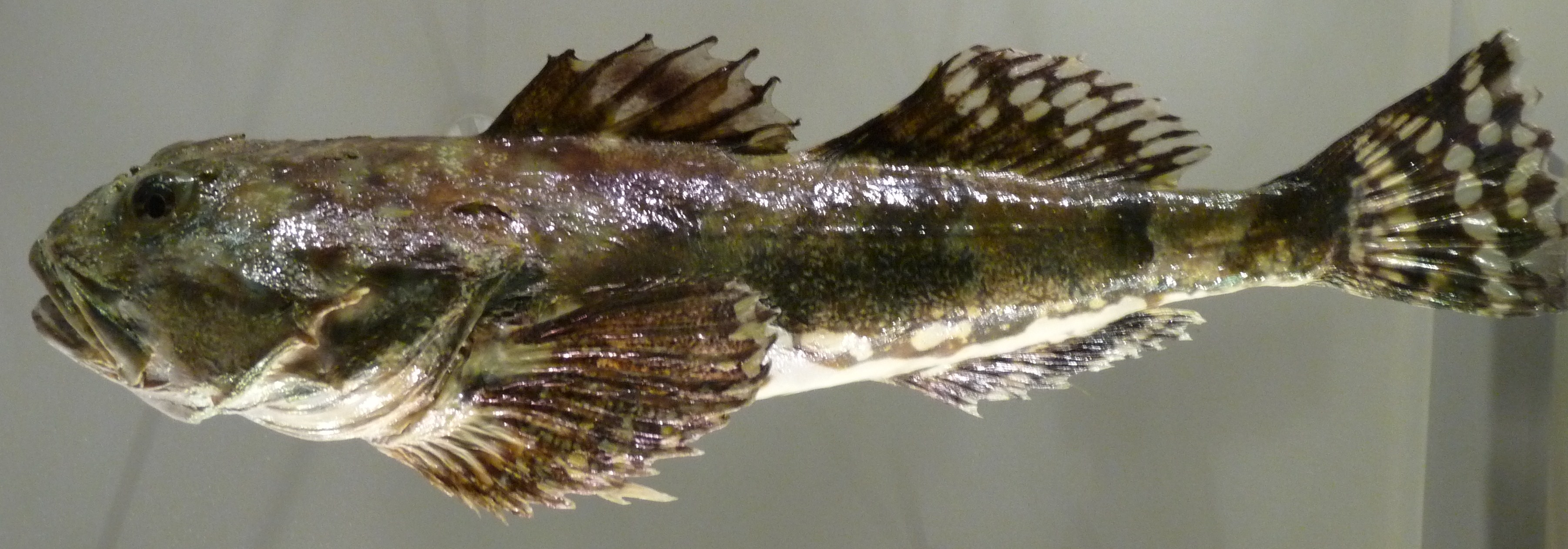

Scientific classification
- Kingdom: Animalia
- Phylum: Chordata
- Class: Actinopterygii
- Order: Perciformes
- Suborder: Cottoidei
- Family: Psychrolutidae
- Genus: Myoxocephalus
- Species: M. stelleri

Binomial name
- Myoxocephalus stelleri Tilesius, 1811

Synonyms
- Cottus marmoratus Valenciennes, 1832; Cottus decastrensis Kner, 1865; Myoxocephalus raninus Jordan & Starks, 1904; Myoxocephalus incitus Watanabe, 1958

= Steller's sculpin =

Species of fish

Steller's sculpin (Myoxocephalus stelleri), also known as frog sculpin, is a species of marine ray-finned fish belonging to the family Cottidae, the typical sculpins. This species is found in the northern Pacific, from the Aleutian Islands to the Sea of Okhotsk and the Sea of Japan. Described by Wilhelm Gottlieb Tilesius von Tilenau in 1811, it is the type species of the genus Myoxocephalus.

== Etymology ==
The fish is named in honor of Georg Wilhelm Steller (1709-1746), a German physician-naturalist who worked in Russia and explored the Kamchatka Peninsula; using his unpublished manuscript provided material for the description.
