= Myoxocephalus tuberculatus =

Conservation status
- Data Deficient (IUCN 3.1)

Scientific classification
- Kingdom: Animalia
- Phylum: Chordata
- Class: Actinopterygii
- Order: Perciformes
- Suborder: Cottoidei
- Family: Psychrolutidae
- Genus: Myoxocephalus
- Species: M. tuberculatus

Binomial name
- Myoxocephalus tuberculatus Soldatov & Pavlenko, 1922

Species of fish

Myoxocephalus tuberculatus is a species of marine ray-finned fish belonging to the family Cottidae, the typical sculpins. The species is endemic to the Sea of Okhotsk. It is a demersal fish that lives near the bottom, and has been found on sand and mud substrates in harbours, bays and estuaries, at depths less than 100 m.
