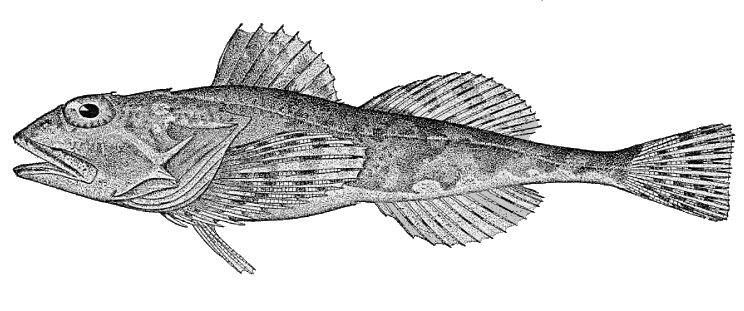

Scientific classification
- Kingdom: Animalia
- Phylum: Chordata
- Class: Actinopterygii
- Division: Teleostei
- Order: Perciformes
- Suborder: Cottoidei
- Family: Psychrolutidae
- Genus: Myoxocephalus
- Species: M. verrucosus

Binomial name
- Myoxocephalus verrucosus (T. H. Bean, 1881)

= Myoxocephalus verrucosus =

Species of fish

Myoxocephalus verrucosus, also known as the warty sculpin, is a Northern Pacific and East Arctic sculpin, a marine fish in the family Psychrolutidae

Myoxocephalus verrucosus is very closely related to the North Atlantic Myoxocephalus scorpius and has been regarded to be synonymous with it by some ichthyologists and major databases.. Others have argued it is a separate, morphologically and genetically identifiable species.
