= Myoxocephalus sinensis =

Scientific classification
- Kingdom: Animalia
- Phylum: Chordata
- Class: Actinopterygii
- Division: Teleostei
- Order: Perciformes
- Suborder: Cottoidei
- Family: Psychrolutidae
- Genus: Myoxocephalus
- Species: M. sinensis

Binomial name
- Myoxocephalus sinensis (Sauvage, 1873)

Synonyms
- Cottus sinensis Sauvage, 1873

Species of fish

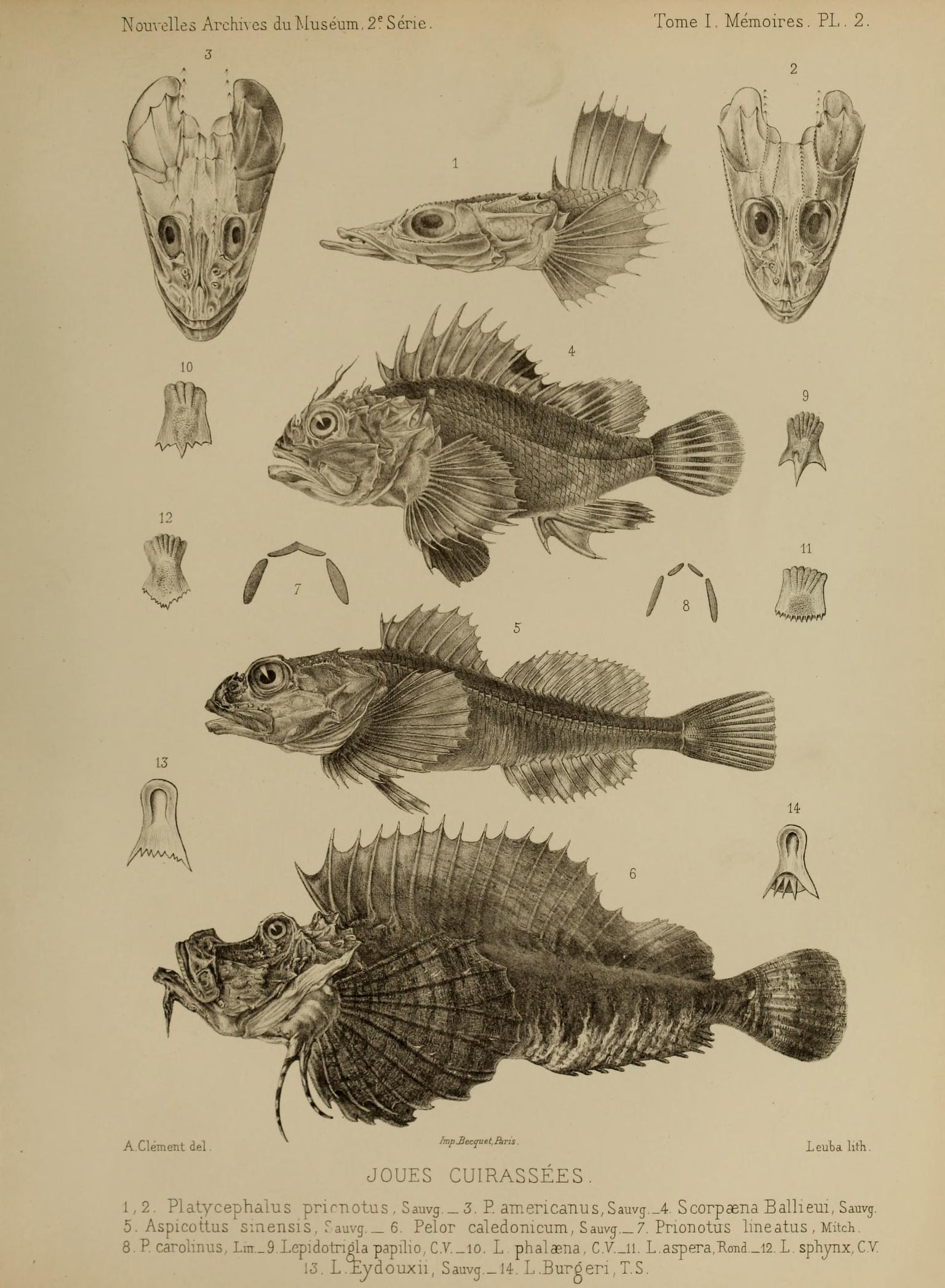
Fig. 5 depicts Myoxocephalus sinensis

Myoxocephalus sinensis is a species of sculpin fish in the family Psychrolutidae. The species is native to China and is indicated variously either as a freshwater or as a marine fish.
