= Antifreeze protein =

Class of peptides which help cells survive freezing conditions

Insect antifreeze protein, Tenebrio-type
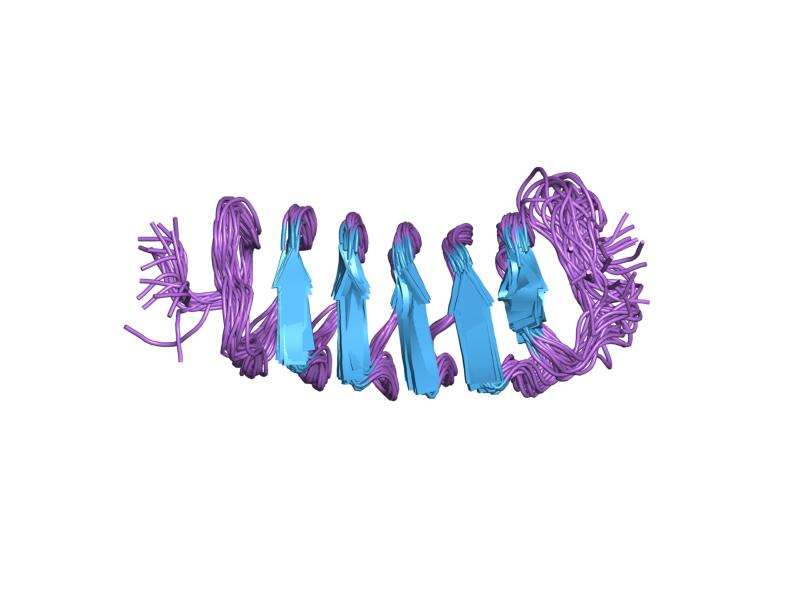
- Structure of the Tenebrio molitor beta-helical antifreeze protein

Identifiers
- Symbol: AFP
- Pfam: PF02420
- InterPro: IPR003460
- SCOP2: 1ezg / SCOPe / SUPFAM
Available protein structures:
- PDB: IPR003460 PF02420 (ECOD; PDBsum)
- AlphaFold: IPR003460; PF02420

Insect antifreeze protein (CfAFP)
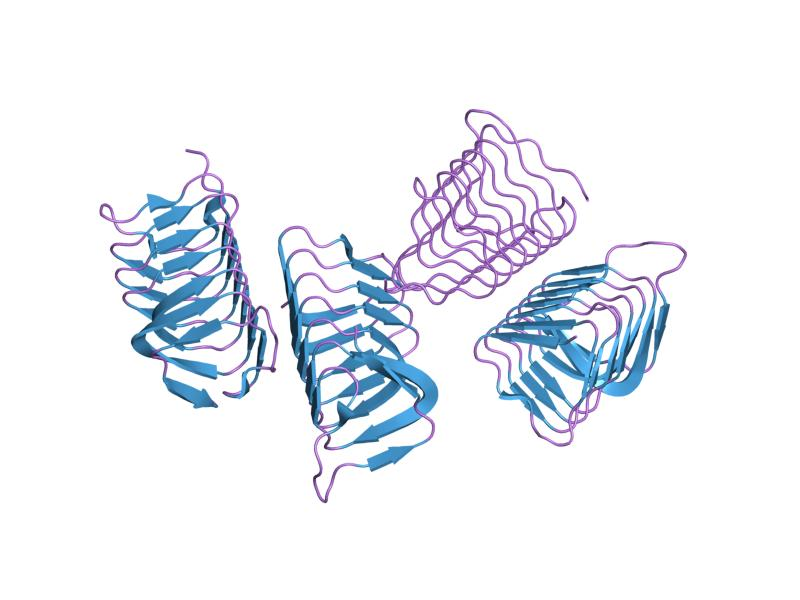
- Structure of Choristoneura fumiferana (spruce budworm) beta-helical antifreeze protein

Identifiers
- Symbol: CfAFP
- Pfam: PF05264
- InterPro: IPR007928
- SCOP2: 1m8n / SCOPe / SUPFAM
Available protein structures:
- PDB: IPR007928 PF05264 (ECOD; PDBsum)
- AlphaFold: IPR007928; PF05264

Fish antifreeze protein, type I

Identifiers
- Symbol: ?
- InterPro: IPR000104
- SCOP2: 1wfb / SCOPe / SUPFAM
Available protein structures:
- PDB: IPR000104
- AlphaFold: IPR000104

Fish antifreeze protein, type II

Identifiers
- Symbol: ?
- InterPro: IPR002353
- CATH: 2py2
- SCOP2: 2afp / SCOPe / SUPFAM
Available protein structures:
- PDB: IPR002353
- AlphaFold: IPR002353

Fish antifreeze protein, type III

Identifiers
- Symbol: ?
- InterPro: IPR006013
- SCOP2: 1hg7 / SCOPe / SUPFAM
Available protein structures:
- PDB: IPR006013
- AlphaFold: IPR006013
- See also the SAF domain (InterPro: IPR013974).

Ice-binding protein-like (sea ice organism)

Identifiers
- Symbol: DUF3494
- Pfam: PF11999
- InterPro: IPR021884
Available protein structures:
- PDB: IPR021884 PF11999 (ECOD; PDBsum)
- AlphaFold: IPR021884; PF11999

Antifreeze proteins (AFPs) or ice structuring proteins refer to a class of polypeptides produced by certain animals, plants, fungi and bacteria that permit their survival in temperatures below the freezing point of water. AFPs bind to small ice crystals to inhibit the growth and recrystallization of ice that would otherwise be fatal. There is also increasing evidence that AFPs interact with mammalian cell membranes to protect them from cold damage. This work suggests the involvement of AFPs in cold acclimatization.

== Non-colligative properties ==
Unlike the widely used automotive antifreeze, ethylene glycol, AFPs do not lower freezing point in proportion to concentration. Rather, they work in a noncolligative manner. This phenomenon allows them to act as an antifreeze at concentrations 1/300th to 1/500th of those of other dissolved solutes. Their low concentration minimizes their effect on osmotic pressure. The unusual properties of AFPs are attributed to their selective affinity for specific crystalline ice forms and the resulting blockade of the ice-nucleation process.

== Thermal hysteresis ==
AFPs create a difference between the melting point and freezing point (busting temperature of AFP bound ice crystal) known as thermal hysteresis. The addition of AFPs at the interface between solid ice and liquid water inhibits the thermodynamically favored growth of the ice crystal. Ice growth is kinetically inhibited by the AFPs covering the water-accessible surfaces of ice.

Thermal hysteresis is easily measured in the lab with a nanolitre osmometer. Organisms differ in their values of thermal hysteresis. The maximum level of thermal hysteresis shown by fish AFP is approximately −3.5 °C (Sheikh Mahatabuddin et al., SciRep)(29.3 °F). In contrast, aquatic organisms are exposed only to −1 to −2 °C below freezing. During the extreme winter months, the spruce budworm resists freezing at temperatures approaching −30 °C.

The rate of cooling can influence the thermal hysteresis value of AFPs. Rapid cooling can substantially decrease the nonequilibrium freezing point, and hence the thermal hysteresis value. Consequently, organisms cannot necessarily adapt to their subzero environment if the temperature drops abruptly.

== Freeze tolerance versus freeze avoidance ==
Species containing AFPs may be classified as

Freeze avoidant: These species are able to prevent their body fluids from freezing altogether. Generally, the AFP function may be overcome at extremely cold temperatures, leading to rapid ice growth and death.

Freeze tolerant: These species are able to survive body fluid freezing. Some freeze tolerant species are thought to use AFPs as cryoprotectants to prevent the damage of freezing, but not freezing altogether. The exact mechanism is still unknown. However, it is thought AFPs may inhibit recrystallization and stabilize cell membranes to prevent damage by ice. They may work in conjunction with ice nucleating proteins (INPs) to control the rate of ice propagation following freezing.

== Diversity ==
There are many known nonhomologous types of AFPs.

=== Fish AFPs ===
Figure 1. The three faces of Type I AFP

Antifreeze glycoproteins or AFGPs are found in Antarctic notothenioids and northern cod. They are 2.6-3.3 kD. AFGPs evolved separately in notothenioids and northern cod. In notothenioids, the AFGP gene arose from an ancestral trypsinogen-like serine protease gene.

- Type I AFP is found in winter flounder, longhorn sculpin and shorthorn sculpin. It is the best documented AFP because it was the first to have its three-dimensional structure determined. Type I AFP consists of a single, long, amphipathic alpha helix, about 3.3-4.5 kD in size. There are three faces to the 3D structure: the hydrophobic, hydrophilic, and Thr-Asx face.
  - Type I-hyp AFP (where hyp stands for hyperactive) are found in several righteye flounders. It is approximately 32 kD (two 17 kD dimeric molecules). The protein was isolated from the blood plasma of winter flounder. It is considerably better at depressing freezing temperature than most fish AFPs. The ability is partially derived from its many repeats of the Type I ice-binding site.
- Type II AFPs (e.g. P05140) are found in sea raven, smelt and herring. They are cysteine-rich globular proteins containing five disulfide bonds. Type II AFPs likely evolved from calcium dependent (c-type) lectins. Sea ravens, smelt, and herring are quite divergent lineages of teleost. If the AFP gene were present in the most recent common ancestor of these lineages, it is peculiar that the gene is scattered throughout those lineages, present in some orders and absent in others. It has been suggested that lateral gene transfer could be attributed to this discrepancy, such that the smelt acquired the type II AFP gene from the herring.
- Type III AFPs are found in Antarctic eelpout. They exhibit similar overall hydrophobicity at ice binding surfaces to type I AFPs. They are approximately 6kD in size. Type III AFPs likely evolved from a sialic acid synthase (SAS) gene present in Antarctic eelpout. Through a gene duplication event, this gene—which has been shown to exhibit some ice-binding activity of its own—evolved into an effective AFP gene by loss of the N-terminal part.
- Type IV AFPs (P80961) are found in longhorn sculpins. They are alpha helical proteins rich in glutamate and glutamine. This protein is approximately 12KDa in size and consists of a 4-helix bundle. Its only posttranslational modification is a pyroglutamate residue, a cyclized glutamine residue at its N-terminus.

=== Plant AFPs ===
The classification of AFPs became more complicated when antifreeze proteins from plants were discovered. Plant AFPs are rather different from the other AFPs in the following aspects:

1. They have much weaker thermal hysteresis activity when compared to other AFPs.
2. Their physiological function is likely in inhibiting the recrystallization of ice rather than in preventing ice formation.
3. Most of them are evolved pathogenesis-related proteins, sometimes retaining antifungal properties.

=== Insect AFPs ===
There are a number of AFPs found in insects, including those from Dendroides, Tenebrio and Rhagium beetles, spruce budworm and pale beauty moths, and midges. Insect AFPs share certain similarities, with most having higher activity (i.e. greater thermal hysteresis value, termed hyperactive) and a repetitive structure with a flat ice-binding surface. Those from the closely related Tenebrio and Dendroides beetles are homologous and each 12–13 amino-acid repeat is stabilized by an internal disulfide bond. Isoforms have between 6 and 10 of these repeats that form a coil, or beta-solenoid. One side of the solenoid has a flat ice-binding surface that consists of a double row of threonine residues. Other beetles (genus Rhagium) have longer repeats without internal disulfide bonds that form a compressed beta-solenoid (beta sandwich) with four rows of threonine residus, and this AFP is structurally similar to that modelled for the non-homologous AFP from the pale beauty moth. In contrast, the AFP from the spruce budworm moth is a solenoid that superficially resembles the Tenebrio protein, with a similar ice-binding surface, but it has a triangular cross-section, with longer repeats that lack the internal disulfide bonds. The AFP from midges is structurally similar to those from Tenebrio and Dendroides, but the disulfide-braced beta-solenoid is formed from shorter 10 amino-acids repeats, and instead of threonine, the ice-binding surface consists of a single row of tyrosine residues. Springtails (Collembola) are not insects, but like insects, they are arthropods with six legs. A species found in Canada, which is often called a "snow flea", produces hyperactive AFPs. Although they are also repetitive and have a flat ice-binding surface, the similarity ends there. Around 50% of the residues are glycine (Gly), with repeats of Gly-Gly- X or Gly-X-X, where X is any amino acid. Each 3-amino-acid repeat forms one turn of a polyproline type II helix. The helices then fold together, to form a bundle that is two helices thick, with an ice-binding face dominated by small hydrophobic residues like alanine, rather than threonine. Other insects, such as an Alaskan beetle, produce hyperactive antifreezes that are even less similar, as they are polymers of sugars (xylomannan) rather than polymers of amino acids (proteins). Taken together, this suggests that most of the AFPs and antifreezes arose after the lineages that gave rise to these various insects diverged. The similarities they do share are the result of convergent evolution.

=== Sea ice organism AFPs ===
Many microorganisms living in sea ice possess AFPs that belong to a single family. The diatoms Fragilariopsis cylindrus and F. curta play a key role in polar sea ice communities, dominating the assemblages of both platelet layer and within pack ice. AFPs are widespread in these species, and the presence of AFP genes as a multigene family indicates the importance of this group for the genus Fragilariopsis. AFPs identified in F. cylindrus belong to an AFP family which is represented in different taxa and can be found in other organisms related to sea ice (Colwellia spp., Navicula glaciei, Chaetoceros neogracile and Stephos longipes and Leucosporidium antarcticum) and Antarctic inland ice bacteria (Flavobacteriaceae), as well as in cold-tolerant fungi (Typhula ishikariensis, Lentinula edodes and Flammulina populicola).

Several structures for sea ice AFPs have been solved. This family of proteins fold into a beta helix that form a flat ice-binding surface. Unlike the other AFPs, there is not a singular sequence motif for the ice-binding site.

AFP found from the metagenome of the ciliate Euplotes focardii and psychrophilic bacteria has an efficient ice re-crystallization inhibition ability. 1 μM of Euplotes focardii consortium ice-binding protein (EfcIBP) is enough for the total inhibition of ice re-crystallization in −7.4 °C temperature. This ice-recrystallization inhibition ability helps bacteria to tolerate ice rather than preventing the formation of ice. EfcIBP produces also thermal hysteresis gap, but this ability is not as efficient as the ice-recrystallization inhibition ability. EfcIBP helps to protect both purified proteins and whole bacterial cells in freezing temperatures. Green fluorescent protein is functional after several cycles of freezing and melting when incubated with EfcIBP. Escherichia coli survives longer periods in 0 °C temperature when the efcIBP gene was inserted to E. coli genome. EfcIBP has a typical AFP structure consisting of multiple beta-sheets and an alpha-helix. Also, all the ice-binding polar residues are at the same site of the protein.

== Evolution ==
The remarkable diversity and distribution of AFPs suggest the different types evolved recently in response to sea level glaciation occurring 1–2 million years ago in the Northern hemisphere and 10-30 million years ago in Antarctica. Data collected from deep sea ocean drilling has revealed that the development of the Antarctic Circumpolar Current was formed over 30 million years ago. The cooling of Antarctic imposed from this current caused a mass extinction of teleost species that were unable to withstand freezing temperatures. Notothenioids species with the antifreeze glycoprotein were able to survive the glaciation event and diversify into new niches.

This independent development of similar adaptations is referred to as convergent evolution. Evidence for convergent evolution in Northern cod (Gadidae) and Notothenioids is supported by the findings of different spacer sequences and different organization of introns and exons as well as unmatching AFGP tripeptide sequences, which emerged from duplications of short ancestral sequences which were differently permuted (for the same tripeptide) by each group. These groups diverged approximately 7-15 million years ago. Shortly after (5-15 mya), the AFGP gene evolved from an ancestral pancreatic trypsinogen gene in Notothenioids. AFGP and trypsinogen genes split via a sequence divergence - an adaptation which occurred alongside the cooling and eventual freezing of the Antarctic Ocean. The evolution of the AFGP gene in Northern cod occurred more recently (~3.2 mya) and emerged from a noncoding sequence via tandem duplications in a Thr-Ala-Ala unit. Antarctic notothenioid fish and arctic cod, Boreogadus saida, are part of two distinct orders and have very similar antifreeze glycoproteins. Although the two fish orders have similar antifreeze proteins, cod species contain arginine in AFG, while Antarctic notothenioid do not. The role of arginine as an enhancer has been investigated in Dendroides canadensis antifreeze protein (DAFP-1) by observing the effect of a chemical modification using 1-2 cyclohexanedione. Previous research has found various enhancers of this bettles' antifreeze protein including a thaumatin-like protein and polycarboxylates. Modifications of DAFP-1 with the arginine specific reagent resulted in the partial and complete loss of thermal hysteresis in DAFP-1, indicating that arginine plays a crucial role in enhancing its ability. Different enhancer molecules of DAFP-1 have distinct thermal hysteresis activity. Amornwittawat et al. 2008 found that the number of carboxylate groups in a molecules influence the enhancing ability of DAFP-1. Optimum activity in TH is correlated with high concentration of enhancer molecules. Li et al. 1998 investigated the effects of pH and solute on thermal hysteresis in Antifreeze proteins from Dendrioides canadensis. TH activity of DAFP-4 was not affected by pH unless the there was a low solute concentration (pH 1) in which TH decreased. The effect of five solutes; succinate, citrate, malate, malonate, and acetate, on TH activity was reported. Among the five solutes, citrate was shown to have the greatest enhancing effect.

This is an example of a proto-ORF model, a rare occurrence where new genes pre exist as a formed open reading frame before the existence of the regulatory element needed to activate them.

In fishes, horizontal gene transfer is responsible for the presence of Type II AFP proteins in some groups without a recently shared phylogeny. In Herring and smelt, up to 98% of introns for this gene are shared; the method of transfer is assumed to occur during mating via sperm cells exposed to foreign DNA. The direction of transfer is known to be from herring to smelt as herring have 8 times the copies of AFP gene as smelt (1) and the segments of the gene in smelt house transposable elements which are otherwise characteristic of and common in herring but not found in other fishes.

There are two reasons why many types of AFPs are able to carry out the same function despite their diversity:

1. Although ice is uniformly composed of water molecules, it has many different surfaces exposed for binding. Different types of AFPs may interact with different surfaces.
2. Although the five types of AFPs differ in their primary structure of amino acids, when each folds into a functioning protein they may share similarities in their three-dimensional or tertiary structure that facilitates the same interactions with ice.

Antifreeze glycoprotein activity has been observed across several ray-finned species including eelpouts, sculpins, and cod species. Fish species that possess the antifreeze glycoprotein express different levels of protein activity. Polar cod (Boreogadus saida) exhibit similar protein activity and properties to the Antarctic species, T. borchgrevinki. Both species have higher protein activity than saffron cod (Eleginus gracilis). Ice antifreeze proteins have been reported in diatom species to help decrease the freezing point of organism's proteins. Bayer-Giraldi et al. 2010 found 30 species from distinct taxa with homologues of ice antifreeze proteins. The diversity is consistent with previous research that has observed the presence of these genes in crustaceans, insects, bacteria, and fungi. Horizontal gene transfer is responsible for the presence of ice antifreeze proteins in two sea diatom species, F. cylindrus and F. curta.

== Mechanisms of action ==
AFPs are thought to inhibit ice growth by an adsorption–inhibition mechanism. They adsorb to nonbasal planes of ice, inhibiting thermodynamically-favored ice growth. The presence of a flat, rigid surface in some AFPs seems to facilitate its interaction with ice via Van der Waals force surface complementarity.

== Binding to ice ==
Normally, ice crystals grown in solution only exhibit the basal (0001) and prism faces (1010), and appear as round and flat discs. However, it appears the presence of AFPs exposes other faces. It now appears the ice surface 2021 is the preferred binding surface, at least for AFP type I. Through studies on type I AFP, ice and AFP were initially thought to interact through hydrogen bonding (Raymond and DeVries, 1977). However, when parts of the protein thought to facilitate this hydrogen bonding were mutated, the hypothesized decrease in antifreeze activity was not observed. Recent data suggest hydrophobic interactions could be the main contributor. It is difficult to discern the exact mechanism of binding because of the complex water-ice interface. Currently, attempts to uncover the precise mechanism are being made through use of molecular modelling programs (molecular dynamics or the Monte Carlo method).

== Binding mechanism and antifreeze function ==
According to the structure and function study on the antifreeze protein from Pseudopleuronectes americanus, the antifreeze mechanism of the type-I AFP molecule was shown to be due to the binding to an ice nucleation structure in a zipper-like fashion through hydrogen bonding of the hydroxyl groups of its four Thr residues to the oxygens along the $[01\overline{1}2]$ direction in ice lattice, subsequently stopping or retarding the growth of ice pyramidal planes so as to depress the freeze point.

The above mechanism can be used to elucidate the structure-function relationship of other antifreeze proteins with the following two common features:

1. recurrence of a Thr residue (or any other polar amino acid residue whose side-chain can form a hydrogen bond with water) in an 11-amino-acid period along the sequence concerned, and
2. a high percentage of an Ala residue component therein.

== History ==
In the 1950s, Norwegian scientist Scholander set out to explain how Arctic fish can survive in water colder than the freezing point of their blood. His experiments led him to believe there was "antifreeze" in the blood of Arctic fish. Then in the late 1960s, animal biologist Arthur DeVries was able to isolate the antifreeze protein through his investigation of Antarctic fish. These proteins were later called antifreeze glycoproteins (AFGPs) or antifreeze glycopeptides to distinguish them from newly discovered nonglycoprotein biological antifreeze agents (AFPs). DeVries worked with Robert Feeney (1970) to characterize the chemical and physical properties of antifreeze proteins. In 1992, Griffith et al. documented their discovery of AFP in winter rye leaves. Around the same time, Urrutia, Duman and Knight (1992) documented thermal hysteresis protein in angiosperms. The next year, Duman and Olsen noted AFPs had also been discovered in over 23 species of angiosperms, including ones eaten by humans. They reported their presence in fungi and bacteria as well.

== Name change ==
Attempts have been made to relabel antifreeze proteins as ice structuring proteins to more accurately represent their function and to dispose of any assumed negative relation between AFPs and automotive antifreeze, ethylene glycol. These two things are completely separate entities, and show loose similarity only in their function.

== Commercial and medical applications ==
Numerous fields would be able to benefit from the protection of tissue damage by freezing. Businesses are currently investigating the use of these proteins in:

- Increasing freeze tolerance of crop plants and extending the harvest season in cooler climates
- Improving farm fish production in cooler climates
- Lengthening shelf life of frozen foods
- Improving cryosurgery
- Enhancing preservation of tissues for transplant or transfusion in medicine
- Therapy for hypothermia
- Human Cryopreservation (Cryonics)

Unilever has obtained UK, US, EU, Mexico, China, Philippines, Australia and New Zealand approval to use a genetically modified yeast to produce antifreeze proteins from fish for use in ice cream production. They are labeled "ISP" or ice structuring protein on the label, instead of AFP or antifreeze protein.

== Recent news ==
One recent, successful business endeavor has been the introduction of AFPs into ice cream and yogurt products. This ingredient, labelled ice-structuring protein, has been approved by the Food and Drug Administration. The proteins are isolated from fish and replicated, on a larger scale, in genetically modified yeast.

There is concern from organizations opposed to genetically modified organisms (GMOs) who believe that antifreeze proteins may cause inflammation. Intake of AFPs in diet is likely substantial in most northerly and temperate regions already. Given the known historic consumption of AFPs, it is safe to conclude their functional properties do not impart any toxicologic or allergenic effects in humans.

As well, the transgenic process of ice structuring proteins production is widely used in society. Insulin and rennet are produced using this technology. The process does not impact the product; it merely makes production more efficient and prevents the death of fish that would otherwise be killed to extract the protein.

Currently, Unilever incorporates AFPs into some of its American products, including some Popsicle ice pops and a new line of Breyers Light Double Churned ice cream bars. In ice cream, AFPs allow the production of very creamy, dense, reduced fat ice cream with fewer additives. They control ice crystal growth brought on by thawing on the loading dock or kitchen table, which reduces texture quality.

In November 2009, the Proceedings of the National Academy of Sciences published the discovery of a molecule in an Alaskan beetle that behaves like AFPs, but is composed of saccharides and fatty acids.

A 2010 study demonstrated the stability of superheated water ice crystals in an AFP solution, showing that while the proteins can inhibit freezing, they can also inhibit melting. In 2021, EPFL and Warwick scientists have found an artificial imitation of antifreeze proteins.
