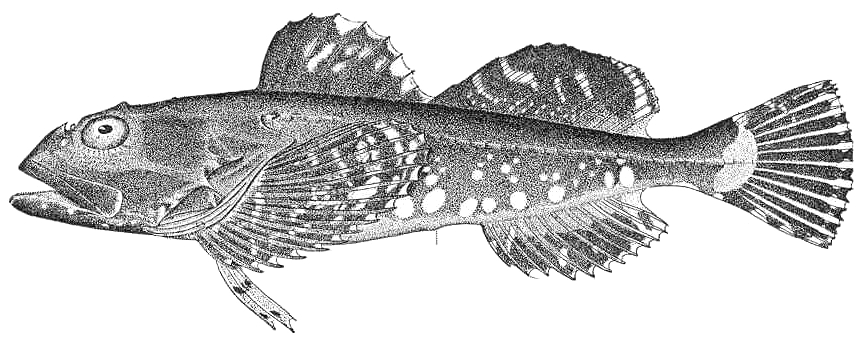

Scientific classification
- Kingdom: Animalia
- Phylum: Chordata
- Class: Actinopterygii
- Order: Perciformes
- Suborder: Cottoidei
- Family: Psychrolutidae
- Genus: Myoxocephalus
- Species: M. niger

Binomial name
- Myoxocephalus niger (T. H. Bean, 1881)

Synonyms
- Cottus niger T. H. Bean, 1881

= Myoxocephalus niger =

Species of fish

Myoxocephalus niger, the warthead sculpin, is a species of marine ray-finned fish belonging to the family Cottidae, the typical sculpins. This demersal fish is found in the northern Pacific Ocean, with a range extending from the Peter the Great Gulf and the Kamchatka Peninsula into the Bering Sea. It is found at depths from 0 to 50 m (0 to 164 ft).
