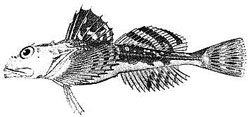

Scientific classification
- Kingdom: Animalia
- Phylum: Chordata
- Class: Actinopterygii
- Order: Perciformes
- Suborder: Cottoidei
- Family: Psychrolutidae
- Genus: Myoxocephalus
- Species: M. octodecemspinosus

Binomial name
- Myoxocephalus octodecemspinosus (Mitchill, 1814)

Synonyms
- Cottus octodecemspinosus Mitchill, 1814

= Longhorn sculpin =

Species of fish

The longhorn sculpin (Myoxocephalus octodecemspinosus) is a species of marine ray-finned fish belonging to the family Cottidae, the typical sculpins.This species is found in the Northwest Atlantic Ocean. It is a predatory and scavenging fish that can feed on the remains of other organisms.

== Description ==
As a member of the Cottidae family, the longhorn sculpin possesses the same general body plan. This entails an elongated body with very large, fanned pectoral fins that allow it to lay flat against the benthic floor. They have disproportionately large heads and exaggerated fins with large spines present. Their caudal fin is rounded, as sculpins do not require very fast propulsion. They possess two dorsal fins and their pelvic fins are located anteriorly. Coloration-wise, the longhorn sculpin is extremely variable, depending on its surroundings. It relies on cryptic camouflage to prevent detection and therefore matches the surrounding corals or rocks closely. Despite the scientific name roughly translating to "18-spined", the longhorn sculpin possesses 20 spines on its head. Additionally, it possess 15 or 16 dorsal rays and 14 anal spines.

The longhorn sculpin appears extremely similar to the shorthorn sculpin (Myoxocephalus scorpius). The main distinguishing feature between the longhorn and shortfin sculpin is the namesake "longhorn" that the longhorn sculpin possesses. It possesses a preopercular spine (specifically the uppermost cheek spine) that is approximately 4 times the length of the spine underneath it. This spine is long enough that the tip of it extends past the gill covers. Of its two dorsal fins, the front-most one is taller, rather than both being approximately equivalent in size. The anal fin of the longhorn sculpin originates under the 2nd or 3rd ray of the second dorsal fin rather than the 4th or 5th, as it would be in the shorthorn sculpin. The lateral line is marked by smooth cartilaginous plates unlike the prickly scales that are found on the shorthorn's. Overall, the longhorn sculpin appears more slender, yet has a flatter head.

== Distribution ==
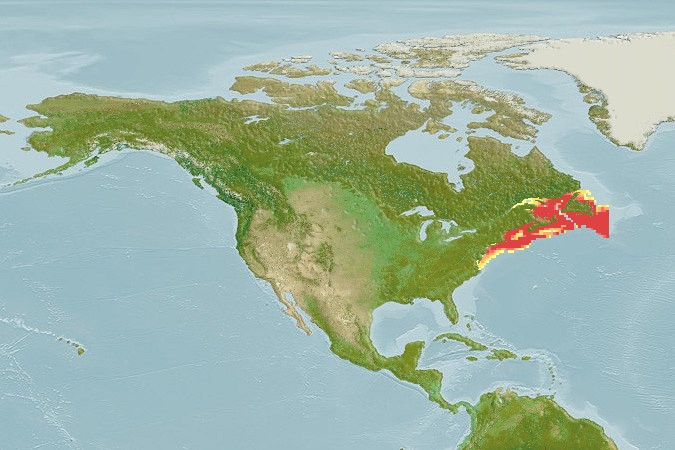
Natural Range distribution of the Longhorn Sculpin

The longhorn sculpin is a demersal, or bottom-dwelling, species that lives in the temperate waters of the northwest Atlantic Ocean. Its range extends as far north as the waters offshore of eastern Newfoundland and the northern Gulf of Saint Lawrence in Canada (52°N). It is found as south as the waters near Virginia in the USA (36°N). It has been found as far inland as 77°W and as far offshore as 50°W. It lives in shallow coastal waters, sometimes utilizing intertidal zones, but moves to deeper waters in the winter. The longhorn sculpin is found in waters from 50m to 100m in depth and waters from 0.5 °C to 19 °C.

== Ecology ==
As adults, longhorn sculpins serve as a benthic, mesopredator foragers. This means that they lie near the middle of the food web, with a large variety of prey but also possessing many predators. The longhorn sculpin commonly consumes crustaceans and smaller fishes near the bottom of the water column. Longhorn sculpins also indulge in opportunistic scavenging and will feed on discarded remains of molluscs when able. This has resulted in them gathering underneath scalloping boats, where shucked remains fall to the sea floor.

As small larvae, longhorn sculpins feed on the various species found in zooplankton. Smaller larvae will consume both the adult and nauplii forms of copepods, especially Harpactidoid copepods. They will also eat Ostracoda (seed shrimps) and Coscinodiscus diatoms. As they grow larger in size, the larva will cease consuming the nauplii of copepods, although they still primarily subsist off of adult copepods. At this larger size they begin consuming the nauplii of Balanus mussels and invertebrate eggs.

As is common in aquatic habitats, longhorn sculpins have been found to suffer from a variety of parasites. They are hosts to both endoparasites and ectoparasites, among which are both unicellular and multicellular parasites. Leeches attach themselves and suck the blood of the longhorn sculpin. Endoparasites are much more common, consisting of several different Apicomplexa, Protozoa, Nematode, and Cestode species. These parasites target the longhorn sculpin's digestive tract, gills, blood, and flesh.

As a relatively small to medium-sized fish, longhorn sculpins are also susceptible to predation. Their primary predators are larger carnivorous fish and seafaring birds like Double-crested Cormorants (Nannopterum auritum) and Bald Eagles (Haliaeetus leucocephalus).

== Taxonomy and Evolution ==
The longhorn sculpin was first formally described as Cottus 18-spinosus in 1814 by the American physician and naturalist Samuel L. Mitchill with its type locality given as New York. The ICZN required that the specific name be changed to octodecemspinosus. The specific name, octodecemspinosus, means "18 spined", an allusion to the number of spines on the head (which is actually 20).

Within the monophyletic genus Myoxocephalus, there are two distinct lineages. The Atlantic lineage and the Pacific lineage. These two lineages are thought to have diverged 7.9 million years ago. Further speciation within the lineages are thought to have occurred within the past 2.9 million years ago. Within the Atlantic lineage, it is thought that M. aenaeus diverged first, then M. octodecemspinosus (longhorn sculpin) diverged from the remaining M. quadricornis complex. Additionally, there is some evidence that the longhorn sculpin should be placed in the genus Megalocottus instead of Myoxocephalus.

== Biology ==
As the longhorn sculpin dwells in extreme cold environments, one of the key points of study relating to this species is its antifreeze properties. There are 4 main structural types of antifreeze proteins that are found in fish but they all work in the same fundamental way. First, they are able to lower the freezing point of the solution that the proteins are found in. Additionally, antifreeze proteins bind to the water crystal nuclei. This prevents additional water molecules from attaching to the ice crystal nuclei, thereby preventing the further freezing of the water solution. The longhorn sculpin is known to have Type I Antifreeze Proteins in its skin and Type IV Antifreeze proteins found primarily in its liver, making it the first fish to possess two antifreeze proteins from different structure classes.

As a utilizer of intertidal zones, longhorn sculpins are at risk of being stranded in small tide pools when the tide recedes. Should this occur, the longhorn sculpin must be able to survive inside the tide pool until the tide rises again or otherwise be able to return to the ocean. In order to achieve this, the longhorn sculpin has evolved moderate hypoxia-resistance. The mechanism is not fully understood but it is thought that specialized enzymes in the brain interfere with the pathways that cause apoptotic death in the cells.

== Spawning and Development ==
The spawning season seems to occur between late November and February, with the most activity occurring between mid-December and mid-January. At this point, the females are between 23.3 cm and 28.1 cm, with the males being between 22.1 cm and 25.5 cm. Their mass ranges are 139.3 g-256.5 g and 103.9 g-189.9 g respectively. During this time, the surface temperature is between 14.8 °C and 18.9 °C and the bottom temperature is between 0.6 °C and 10.1 °C. Spawning usually occurs more inland in waters as shallow as 24.9 m.

Longhorn sculpin eggs are green, red, and reddish brown with an approximate diameter of 2.1-3.3 mm. It takes 36-65 days of development from fertilization for a longhorn sculpin egg to hatch. Upon hatching, individuals have a total length between 6.2 mm and 7.8 mm, with a standard length between 6.0 mm and 7.2 mm. At this stage, they are still reliant on their yolk sacs and oil globules for nutrients, as many of their features are still not fully developed.

The hatchling longhorn sculpins will only finish absorbing their yolk sacs about 10 days after hatching. At this point, they are considered to be postlarve and will have a well-developed mouth. Additionally a pair of head spines and 3 or 4 preopercular spines will begin to be visible. Postlarvae have a total length between 7.1 mm and 8.3 mm.

After 5-10 additional more days (15-20 days after hatching), the remainder of the oil globule will finish being absorbed, making the individual a larva. At this point, they will have 4 pairs of visible preopercular spines. This is also the age range when pigmentation begins, due to the development of melanophores and contraction of chromatophores. Larvae at this stage have a total length between 8.3 mm and 9.1 mm. After 33-40 days since hatching, the anal fins and dorsal fins begin developing. During this stage, a second pair of head spines will also develop. These larvae have an approximate total length of 9.0 mm. After 51-58 days since hatching, the larva begins to metamorphose. During this stage, the individual will have 5 pairs of opercular spines, with one of them beginning to grow into the namesake "longhorn" and the head spines will fuse. At this stage, the larvae will have a total length around 12.0 mm.

65 day old juveniles will then begin developing more adult characteristics and pigmentations. These juveniles have an approximate total length of 13.0 mm. After 3 years, once they reach a total length of 24 cm (240mm), they are considered to have matured into adults.
