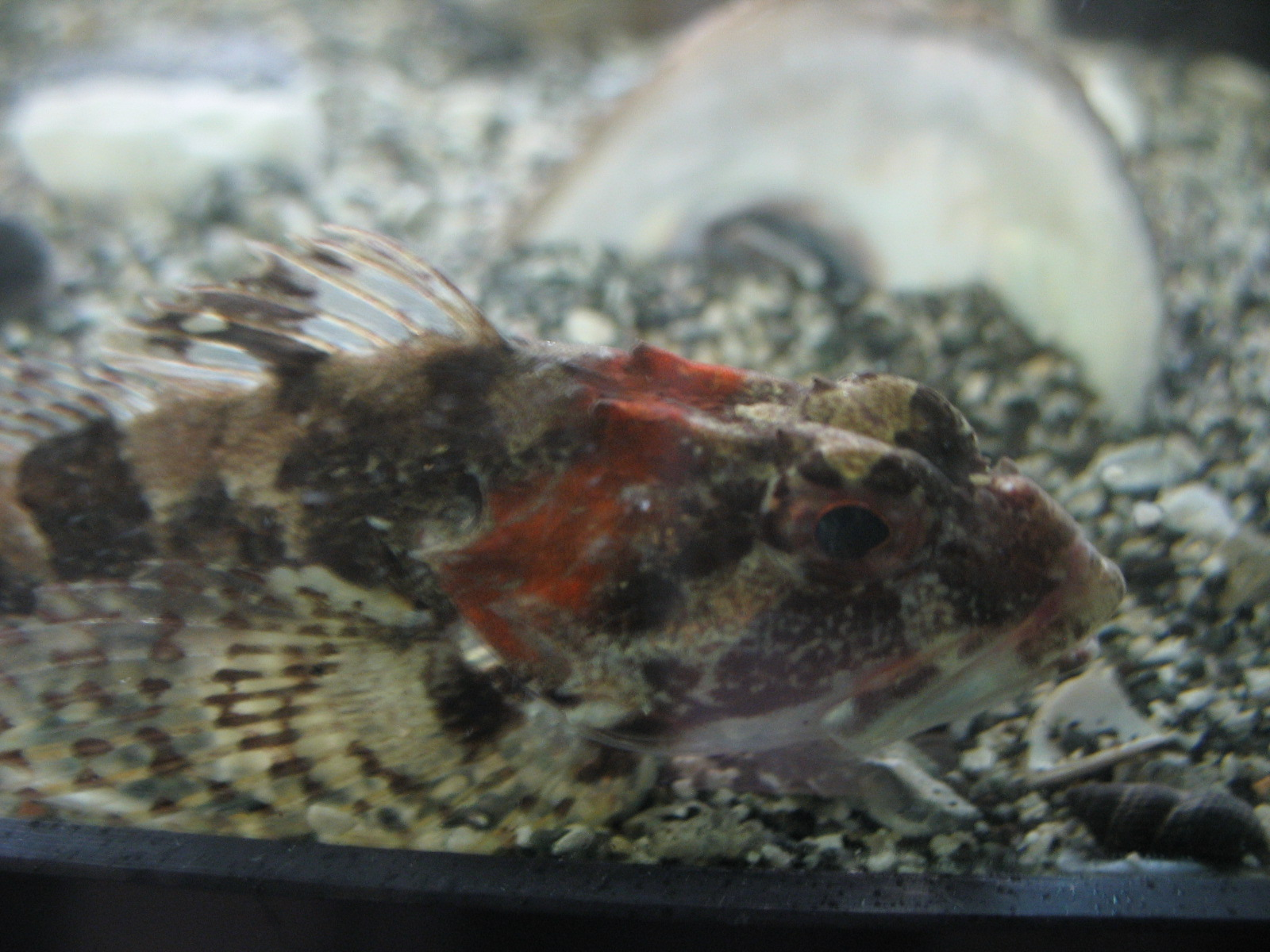

Conservation status
- Secure (NatureServe)

Scientific classification
- Kingdom: Animalia
- Phylum: Chordata
- Class: Actinopterygii
- Order: Perciformes
- Suborder: Cottoidei
- Family: Psychrolutidae
- Genus: Myoxocephalus
- Species: M. aenaeus

Binomial name
- Myoxocephalus aenaeus (Mitchill, 1814)

Synonyms
- Cottus aenaeus Mitcill, 1814

= Myoxocephalus aenaeus =

Species of fish

Myoxocephalus aenaeus, commonly known as the grubby, or little sculpin, is a species of marine ray-finned fish belonging to the family Cottidae, the typical sculpins. This species is found in the northwestern Atlantic Ocean.

== Taxonomy ==
Myoxocephalus aenaeus was first formally described as Cottus aenaeus in 1814 by the American physician and naturalist Samuel L. Mitchill with its type locality given as New York. The specific name aenaeus means "brazen", as in brassy, a reference to the yellowish "brass-colored" body and "brassy-white" belly.

== Description ==
Myoxocephalus aenaeus is variable in color, varying from brown to gray, marked with darker saddles along the back. The upper spine on the preoperculum is not greater than double the length of the lower spine. There is no pore under the gills behind the last gill arch. The anal fin is supported by between 9 and 11 soft rays. This species reaches a maximum published total length of 18 cm (7.1 in).

== Distribution and habitat ==
Myoxocephalus aenaeus is native to the northwest Atlantic Ocean, with a range extending from Belle Isle and the Gulf of Saint Lawrence to New Jersey.

== Reproduction and development ==
Myoxocephalus aenaeus has a spawning season which begins in winter and extends into spring. Spawning begins in coastal waters and later occurs in offshore oceanic waters. The spawning in coastal waters has been reported to occur only in winter and early spring. Parts of the central Atlantic only allow for spawning times between February and May, but judging by larval presence in the Middle Atlantic Blight, spawning occurs there from March until June.
