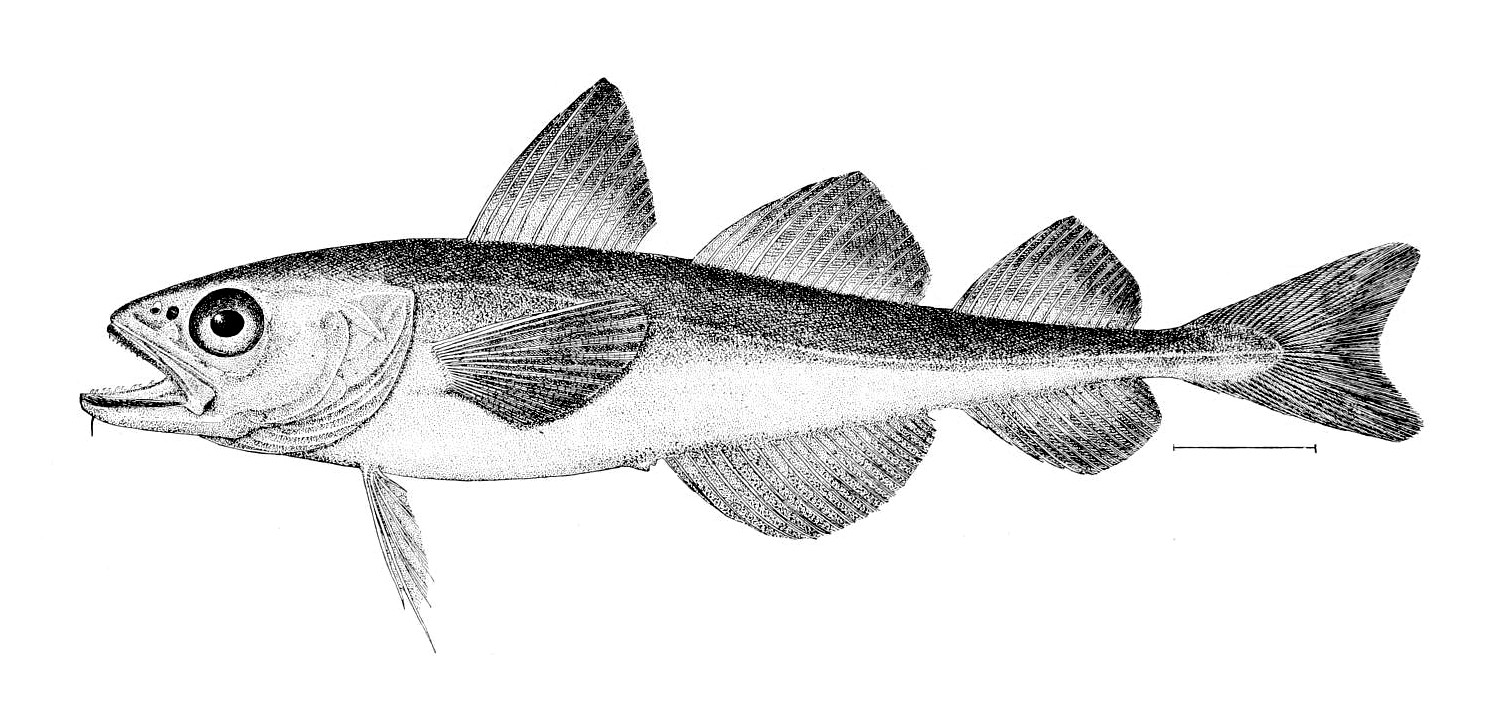

Scientific classification
- Kingdom: Animalia
- Phylum: Chordata
- Class: Actinopterygii
- Order: Gadiformes
- Family: Gadidae
- Genus: Boreogadus; Günther, 1862
- Species: B. saida

Binomial name
- Boreogadus saida (Lepechin, 1774)

Synonyms
- Gadus saida Lepechin, 1774; Merlangus polaris Sabine, 1824; Boreogadus polaris (Sabine, 1824); Pollachius polaris (Sabine, 1824); Gadus fabricii Richardson, 1836; Gadus agilis Reinhardt, 1837

= Boreogadus =

Species of fish

Boreogadus saida, known as the polar cod or as the Arctic cod, is a fish of the cod family Gadidae, related to the true cod (genus Gadus). Another fish species for which both the common names Arctic cod and polar cod are used is Arctogadus glacialis.

== Description ==
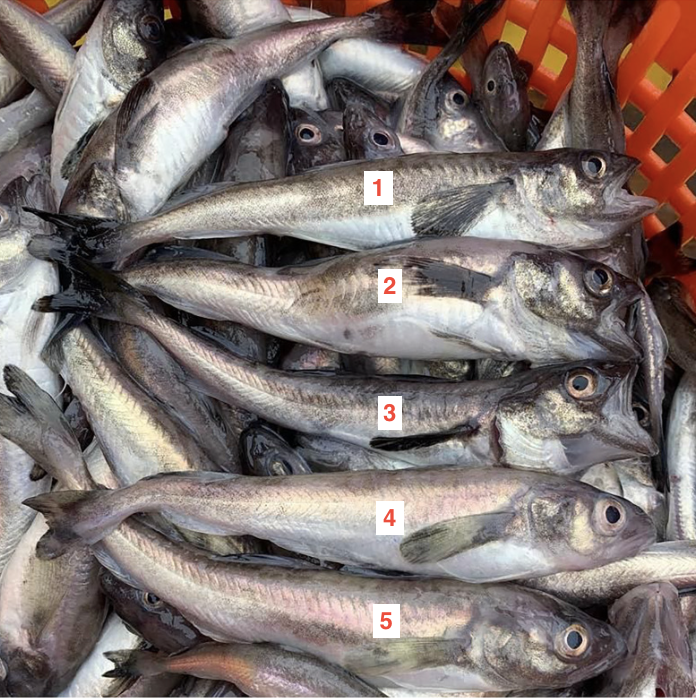
Dark (1, 2, 3) and light (4, 5) morphotypes described by Inuit fishers

Arctic cod have slender bodies, deeply forked tails, a projecting mouth, and a small chin barbel. They have three dorsal fins and two anal fins, which are all separate from each other. The caudal fin is concave, the pectoral fins reach beyond the end of the first dorsal fin, and the pelvic fins are elongated rays. The lateral line is interrupted along the entire length of the fish.

They are plainly coloured with brownish spots and a silvery body. Greenlandic Inuit fishers have described two morphotypes of Arctic cod, a lighter-colored variety and a darker-colored variety.

Arctic cod are frequently misidentified as polar cod (Arctogadus glacialis) during their larval and early juvenile stages. The species can be differentiated through the analysis of otoliths or molecular data.

Arctic cod grow to an average length of 25 cm (9.8 in), and a maximum length of 40 cm (16 in).

== Geographical distribution ==
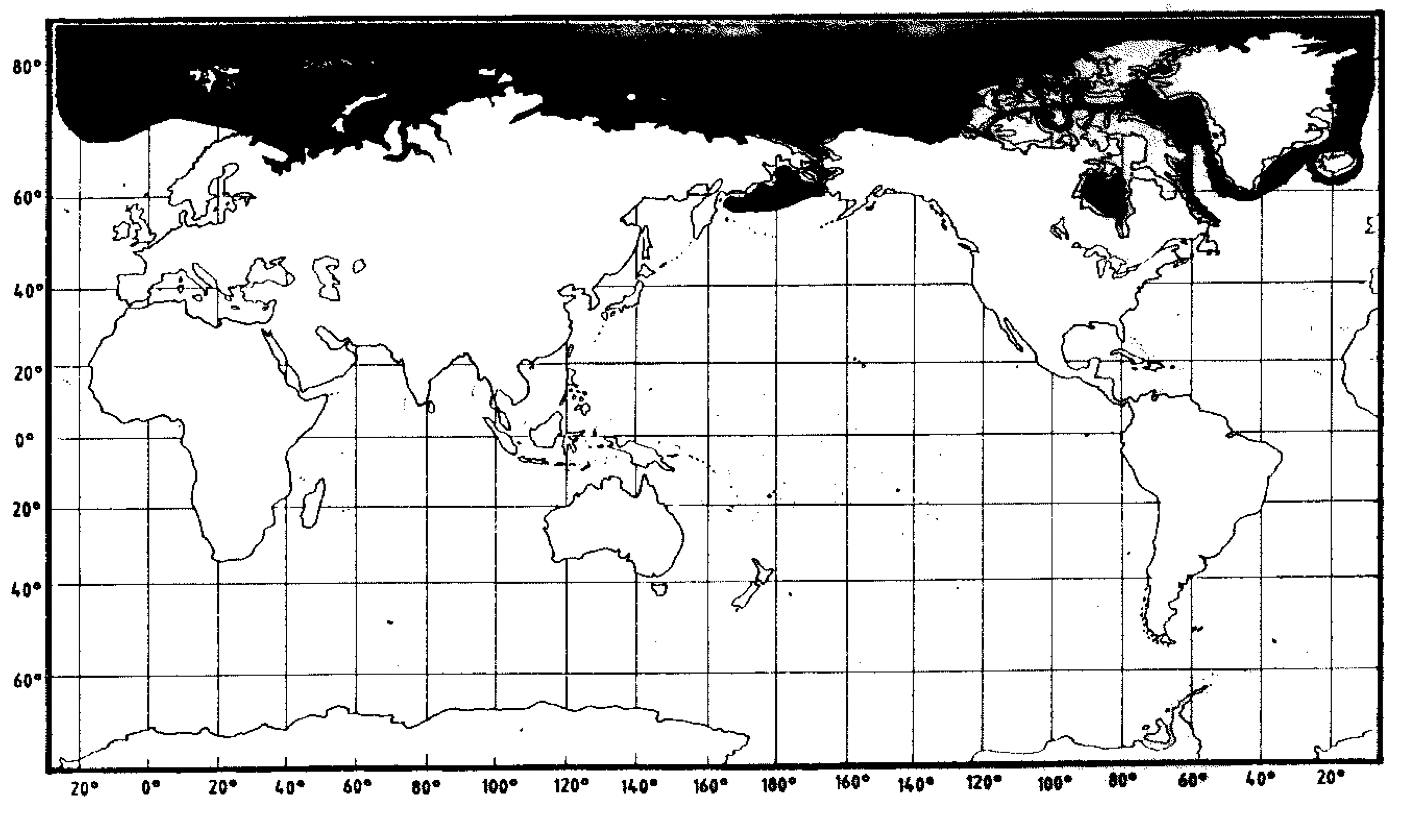
Geographical distribution of Arctic cod

This species is found further north than any other fish (beyond 84°N) with a circumpolar distribution spanning the entire North Polar Basin above Russia, Alaska, Canada, and Greenland. More specifically, in the Arctic Ocean, Bering Sea, Chukchi Sea, Beaufort Sea, Hudson Bay, Baffin Bay, Greenland Sea, Barents Sea, Kara Sea, Laptev Sea and the Eastern Siberian Sea. Arctic cod occur in almost all Arctic and Subarctic marine habitats, ranging from coastal waters, the mesopelagic zone, the deeper central Arctic Ocean, and under ice. Arctic cod are the most abundant demersal Arctic species in the Beaufort Sea.

Arctic cod exhibit diel vertical migration patterns during winter and spring, but migration is not observed during summer.

== Habitat ==
Early life stages of Arctic cod are found near the surface in both ice-covered and open water; however, adults are found deeper in the water column. In the Canadian Arctic, Arctic cod will separate vertically in the water column by size, with younger fish in the upper 100 meters (330 ft) of the water column, and juvenile and immature fish below 200 meters (660 ft).

Arctic cod can also be found in dense schools near glacial fronts and polynyas. Subsurface plumes of freshwater discharged from glaciers create foraging hotspots, aggregating zooplankton where they are stunned or killed by osmotic shock, making them easy prey for Arctic cod. Greenlandic Inuit fishers have reported the presence of Arctic cod near the Sermilik and Sermeq Avannarleq glaciers, located off the southwestern coast of Greenland.

== Adaptations to Arctic waters ==
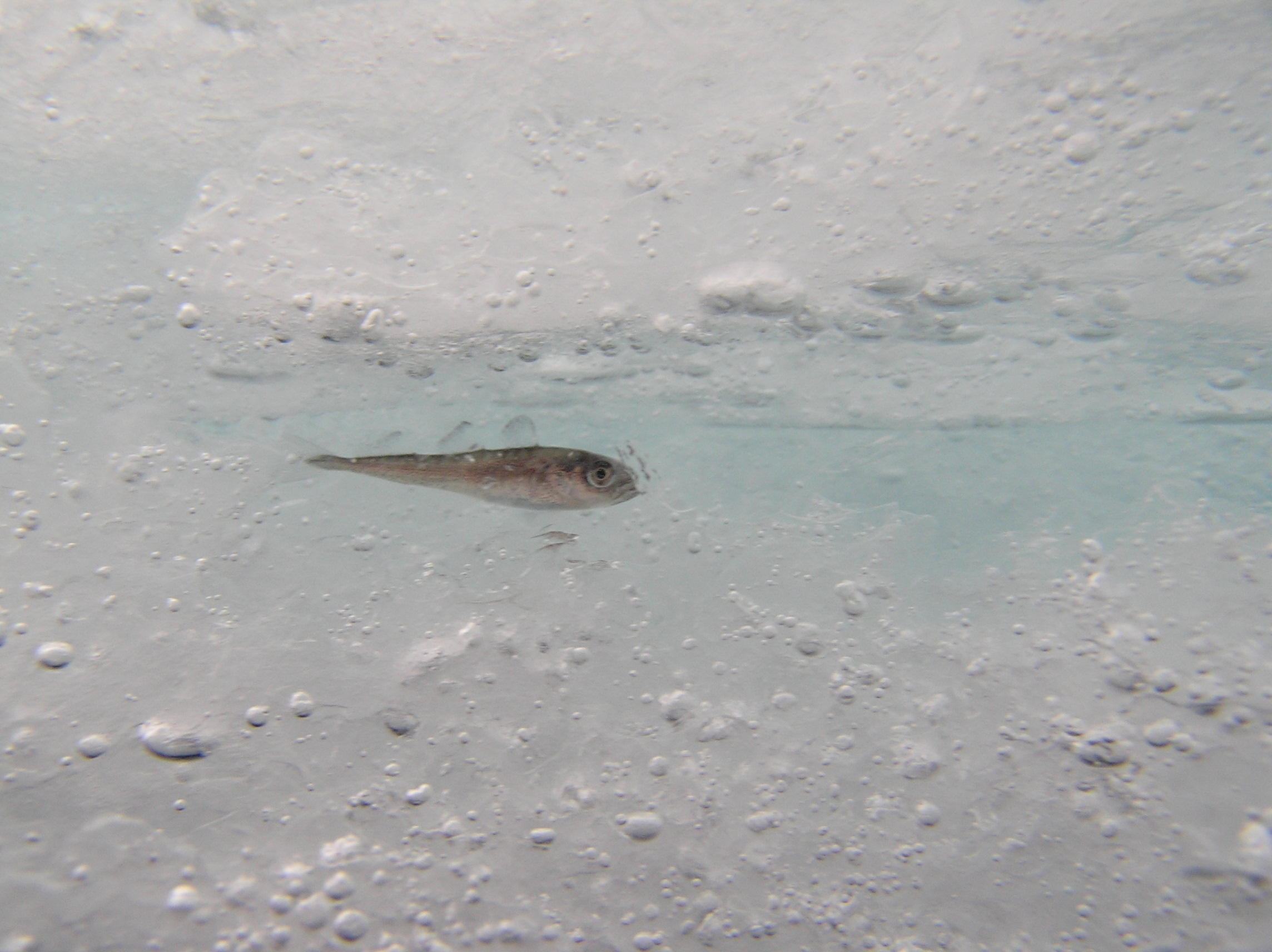
An Arctic Cod rests in an ice-covered space. Alaska, Beaufort Sea, North of Point Barrow.

Arctic cod have several adaptations that allow them to function in freezing polar waters where most other species could not. These waters, though incredibly cold, have a lower freezing point due to their high salt content. While Arctic cod do have higher salt concentrations in their bodies compared to fish in warmer waters, this only accounts for half of the decrease in the cod's freezing point. The key adaptation that allow for a decrease in their freezing point lies in their blood: specifically, high molecular mass antifreeze glycoproteins. These special proteins decrease the freezing point of ice, preventing the formation of ice crystals in the blood. This mechanism allows Arctic cod to thrive in freezing waters.

Antifreeze glycoproteins first occurred about 5 to 15 million years ago, coinciding with the freezing of the Antarctic Ocean. Arctic cod have antifreeze glycoprotein genes that are similar to other notothenioid Antarctic fish, however, the protein-coding sequences are not identical. This suggests that the ability to produce antifreeze glycoproteins evolved independently in both fish, showing convergent evolution due to similar cold environments. How exactly these proteins prevent ice formation remains unknown.

Arctic cod have unique kidneys that lack glomeruli, structures found in most organisms that filter out toxins from the blood. This adaptation, shared with Antarctic notothenioid fish, help the cod retain vital antifreeze glycoproteins in their blood. It also prevents the fish from experiencing osmotic stress, as the high salt content of the Arctic Oceans draws water out of their bodies.

== Keystone species in the Arctic ==
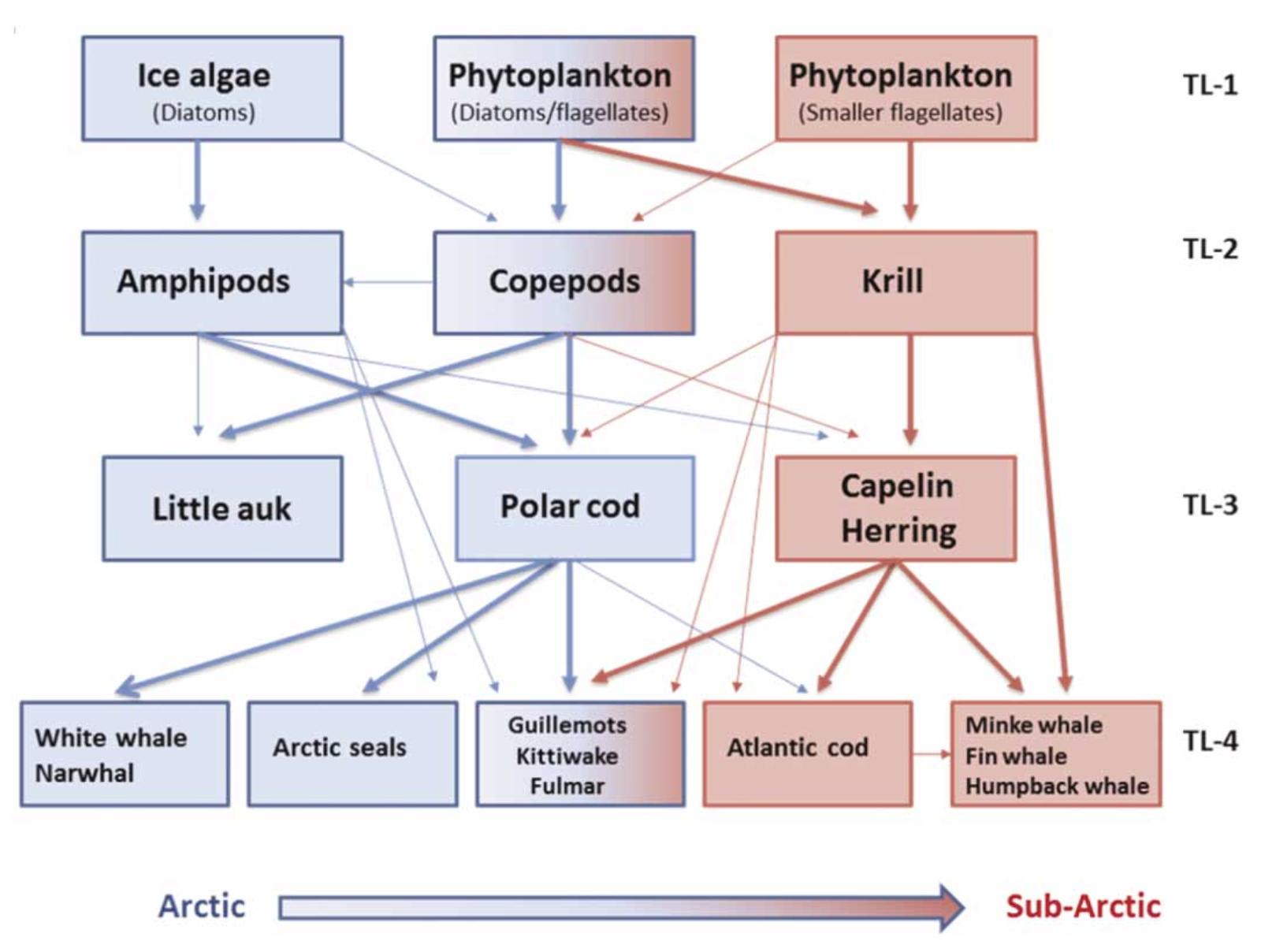
Diagram of B. saida's (in this diagram, labeled polar cod) marine food web and the shift towards Subarctic as B. saida populations decrease, with indicated links and trophic levels (TL-1 to -4). Thickness of arrows indicates relative importance of energy flow based on known stomach content of predators

Arctic cod are a keystone species in Arctic marine food webs. Because Arctic cod have high lipid concentrations relative to their size, predators in the Arctic rely on this species as their main food source. Arctic cod funnel more than 70% of the energy from zooplankton to higher trophic levels and are the most energy-rich prey species in the Arctic.

Arctic cod are locally dominant prey for Atlantic cod, Arctic char, and Greenland halibut. They are also prey for seabirds, specifically the thick-billed murre, black guillemot, common murre, northern fulmar, black-legged kittiwake, ivory gull, and glaucous gull. Arctic cod are the primary food source for species endemic to the Arctic, namely narwhals, belugas, ringed seals, and harp seals.

== Diet ==
Arctic cod are generalists that feed on plankton and krill, more specifically hyperiid amphipods, gammarid amphipods, and copepods. Diet varies based on size, region, and locality. Arctic cod larvae feed on eggs, nauplii, and copepods. Larger Arctic cod engage in piscivory. When their preferred prey is scarce, Arctic cod are adaptable and will switch to any other available prey.

Because Arctic winters have low primary production rates, Arctic cod accumulate energy reserves rapidly during the late summer to prepare for the overwintering period. To withstand short summer growing seasons, Arctic cod juveniles enter winter with higher lipid concentrations compared to boreal species.

== Reproduction and life stages ==
Arctic cod have multiple reproductive cycles throughout their lives. Arctic cod are an r-selected species, meaning they reach maturity early and produce high numbers of offspring. On average, a female will lay between 9,000 and 21,000 eggs. Spawning occurs between September and April, and peaks between January and February. Spawning locations are not fully known, but spawning is suggested to occur in the Barents Sea to the southwest of the Svalbard Island chain, and the Kara and Pechora seas. In the Canadian Arctic, spawning is suggested to occur near the Franklin and Darney bays. In the Pacific Arctic, spawning is suggested to occur in the northern Bering Sea, Chukchi Sea, and Kotzebue Sound. Greenlandic Inuit fishers have noted a spawning area near Saattut Island.

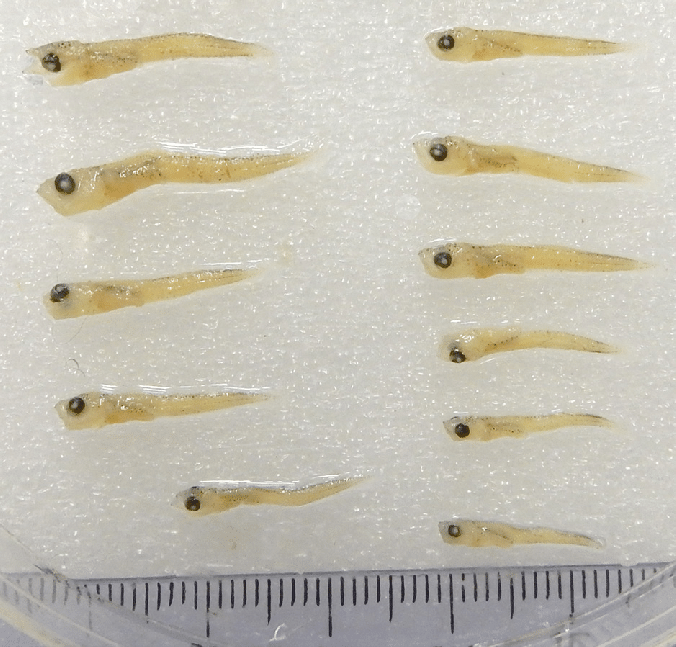
Larvae of Arctic cod, total length 15.0–23.5 mm, from Severnaya Zemlya, Mikoyan Bay.

The development and viability of Arctic cod eggs depend heavily on temperature. Eggs develop normally between −1.5 and 3 °C (29 and 37 °F); however, hatching success severely declines above 2 °C (36 °F). Incubation time decreases as temperatures increase: at 1.5 °C (35 °F), it will take 79 days for larvae to hatch, but at 3.8 °C (39 °F), incubation time decreases to 29 days. In the Canadian Arctic, Arctic cod hatch under the ice from January to July and remain under the ice until fall.

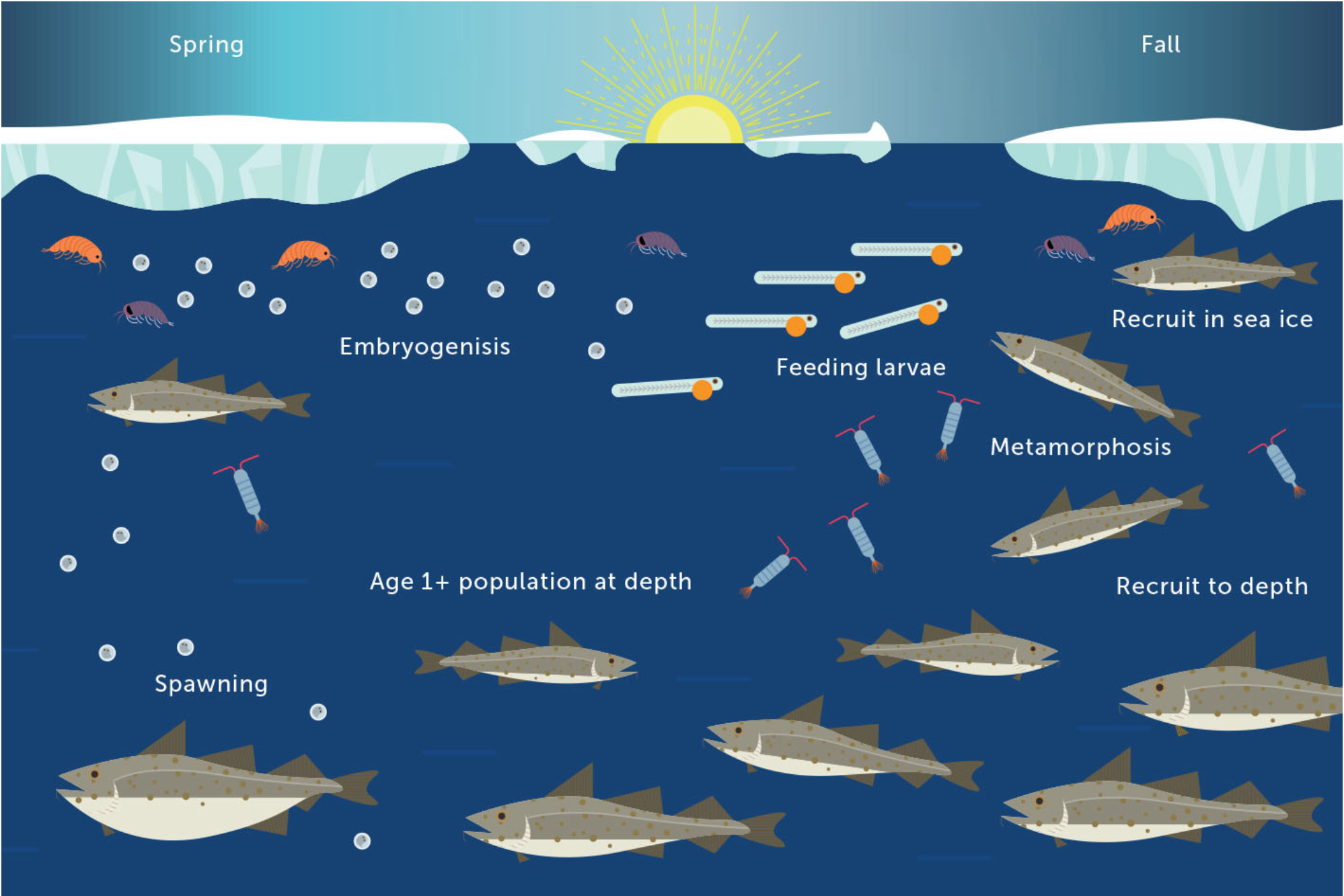
Life Cycle of Arctic cod in a year

Arctic cod larvae can be between 3.5mm and 7mm after hatching; however, in experimental settings, length after hatching decreases when temperatures increase. The larvae have a higher temperature tolerance range than the eggs. Larvae are euryhaline, meaning that they can withstand different salinity concentrations. Therefore, they can be found in areas with glacial meltwater, in river mouths, or in ice-covered areas. The larger the larvae are, the higher the chance of survival they have, especially during the transition between yolk feeding to exogenous feeding.

Juvenile Arctic cod have a much larger temperature tolerance range than larvae and eggs, tolerating temperatures from 0 to 12 °C (32 to 54 °F). Arctic cod exhibit isometric growth, but allometric fat storage. Juvenile Arctic cod are found in the pelagic zone of the water column and descend deeper after their first summer. Some juveniles are found within cavities in sea ice. It is hypothesized that juveniles that have hatched late remain sympagic to avoid predation from adult Arctic cod and competition from other juvenile Arctic cod. Arctic cod reach sexual maturity at around age 2 to 3.

Adult Arctic cod can tolerate temperatures up to 13.5 °C (56.3 °F) and function best between 3 and 10 °C (37 and 50 °F). Adults are found deeper than 100 meters (330 ft) in the water column and are not associated with sea ice.

== Conservation status ==
In 2021, the Arctic cod was listed as highly threatened by the Norwegian Red List due to the impacts of increasing ocean temperatures on embryo survival.

== Fishery ==
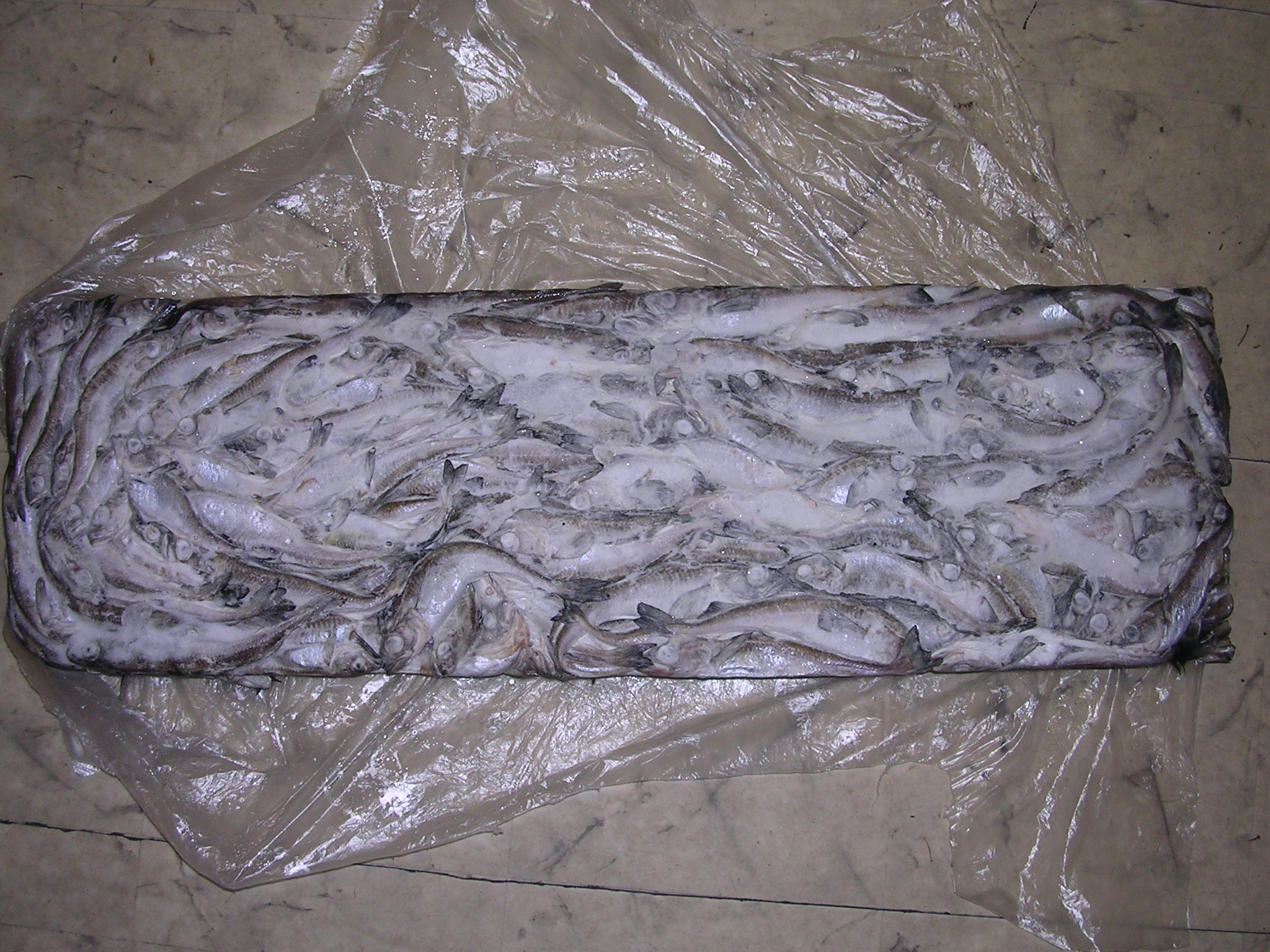
Arctic cod frozen at sea from a Russian vessel. Typically 10 or 16 kg net weight.

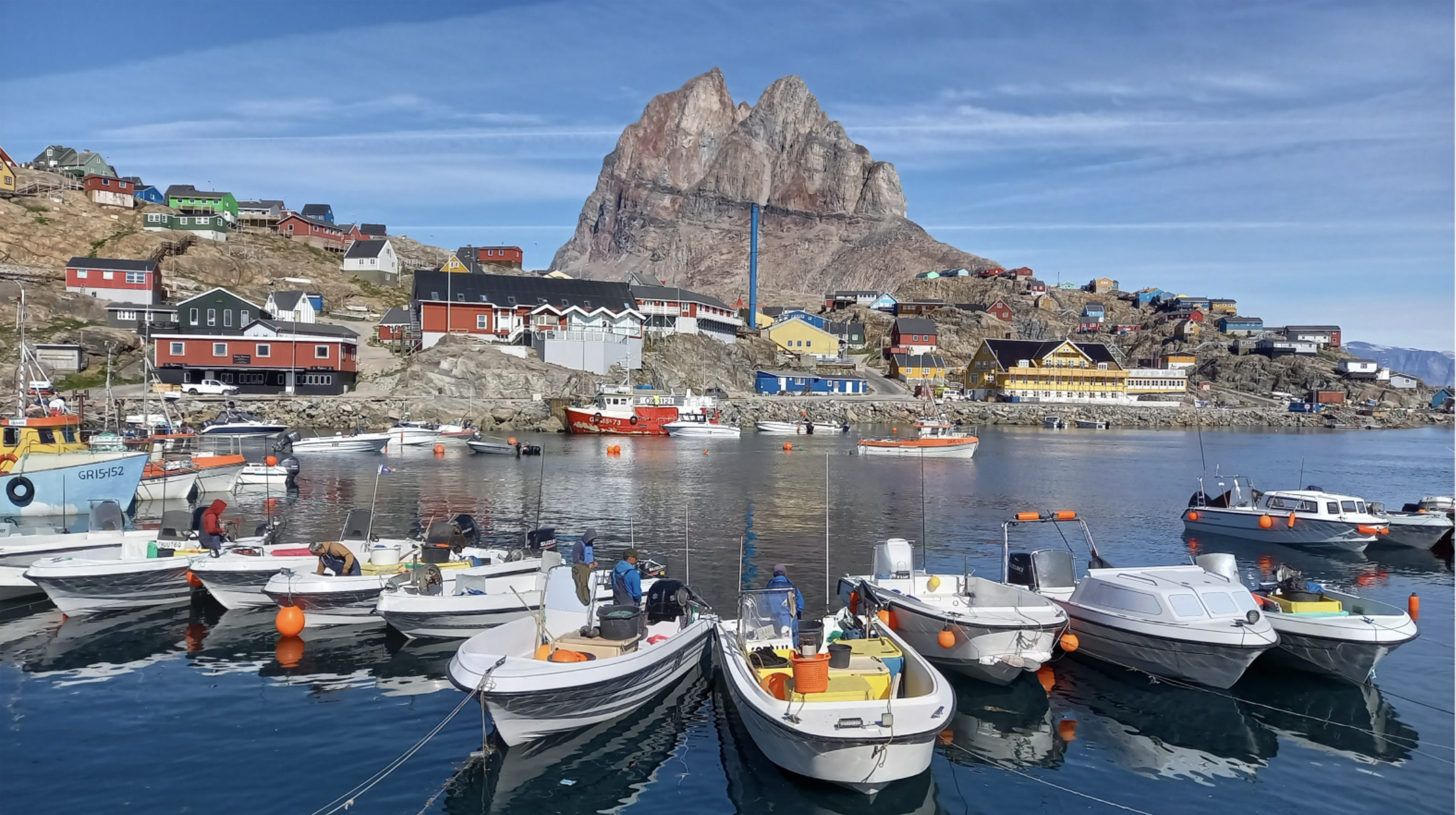
Uummannaq fishers preparing their longlines onboard dinghies used for Greenland halibut fishing, July 2022. The same dinghies are used for Arctic cod fishing, with nets instead of longlines.

Arctic cod was commercially fished by Norway and Russia in the Barents Sea from 1930 to 2012. The fishery was closed due to declining populations of Arctic cod. Arctic cod are unlikely to become a large-scale fishery in the Arctic due to the remoteness of their habitats and low prices for the species.

Arctic cod are not culturally significant to the Inuit and are not used in subsistence fishing. However, Arctic cod are used by Greenlandic Inuit fishers as bait for Greenland halibut, which is the main fishery in the area. Fishing for Arctic cod is a relatively new practice for the Greenlandic Inuit, as it became more accessible in the 1990s through the availability of sonar echosounders that help detect Arctic cod schools. Before the use of sonar, detection of Arctic cod was possible but less efficient. Therefore, Arctic cod were not fished at larger scales as it was not profitable. Greenlandic Inuit fishers locate schools of Arctic cod by observing the movements of predators in combination with the use of sonar. They catch the cod with mesh nets at depths of 10–50 m (33–164 ft) and up to 200 m (660 ft). Due to the remote fishing areas, fishers typically only go out to fish every 2 to 4 days.

Arctic cod is caught as bycatch in bottom trawls used for Greenland halibut and northern and striped shrimp fishing. Arctic cod bycatch reaches about 50 tons in each fishery.

== Impacts of climate change ==
Although very populous throughout the Arctic Ocean, Arctic cod can still be victim to threats from human actions. Global warming has increased steadily over the past years, and it has caused an increase in ocean temperatures of the Arctic Ocean. Arctic cod live in extremely cold water temperatures, and therefore they have adapted to sub-zero temperatures. Arctic cod populations are predicted to decline due to climate change.

The Canadian Arctic has low pelagic fish biodiversity and is controlled by lower trophic levels, meaning that the area is more sensitive to changes in Arctic cod populations than other Arctic regions. Changes to Arctic cod populations will have cascading effects on populations of endemic Canadian Arctic species used by Inuit subsistence fishers and hunters.

Ocean temperatures in the Arctic are warming and sea ice extent is reducing. Boreal species can withstand these warmer temperatures, extending their ranges northward into habitats historically inhabited by only Arctic species. In the Barents Sea, boreal capelin, Atlantic cod, and haddock have already started moving northwards into Arctic cod dominated areas. Arctic cod now face increased competition and predation from these boreal species.

Arctic cod embryos are also sensitive to temperature. Increasing sea surface temperatures will decrease the optimal thermal range for embryos. Their larvae must be in 3 °C to hatch normally, and a rise in ocean temperatures can easily lead to phenotypic changes of this cod species. Possible alterations of the species due to increasing ocean temperatures include, smaller size, reduced fecundity, earlier maturation, and increased investment in reproduction at an early age for some.

Arctic cod eggs are laid underneath sea ice, and as temperatures increase, sea ice cover will decrease. Arctic cod eggs will be increasingly exposed to UV radiation, turbulence and temperature changes, which could affect mortality. Reduced sea ice will also decrease the amount of refuge habitat available for juveniles. Ice dwelling Arctic cod will be affected by the loss of habitat complexity and structures provided by established sea ice. If sea ice forms later in autumn, Arctic cod spawning times may shift, and spawning habitat will decrease.

Climate change will also affect the primary production and availability of Arctic cod prey. Climate models predict that ice algae populations will increase because of decreases in ice thickness, allowing more light for primary production. This change will be favorable for young Arctic cod, but inter-annual variability in primary production might lead to different long-term outcomes.

Less sea ice will lead to increased anthropogenic activities in the Arctic, especially commercial shipping. Experimental studies have shown that Arctic cod respond to noise pollution from moving shipping vessels by retreating to areas with lower noise levels. Arctic cod also tend to aggregate in the presence of vessel noise. Increased usage of shipping lanes through the Arctic will likely fragment habitat for Arctic cod. With shipping comes the possibility of oil spills, which will also affect Arctic cod as they lack glomeruli to filter out toxins from their blood.
