= Grubby Hands Limited =

UK video game developer

- Industry: Video games
- Founded: 16 May 2011; 15 years ago
- Headquarters: United Kingdom
- Products: David Haye's Knockout; Boy Loves Girl; David Haye's Jungle Rumble
- Website: grubbyhands.com

Grubby Hands Limited is an independent games studio, best known for the mobile game David Haye’s Knockout. It is among the five most recent companies that were started by former staff members of Bizarre Creations, following the studio's closure in 2011.

== History ==
In February 2011, Activision, the owners of Bizarre Creations, decided to close the studio, prompting several former staff members to set up their own separate development companies of varying sizes. Danny Pearce, Bizarre Creations' former senior programmer, founded Grubby Hands in May 2011.

== Games ==
=== David Haye's Knockout ===
David Haye’s Knockout was made in association with David Haye, the former heavyweight champion whom the game is named after. The game was released in conjunction with Haye's heavyweight unification title fight with Wladimir Klitschko in Hamburg. The iPhone game caused much controversy within the press, specifically for the ability of the player to punch their opponent hard enough to decapitate them. On 10 June 2011, Grubby Hands released their first game David Haye's Knockout on the iPhone, iPad, and iPod touch.

On its first release, David Haye’s Knockout immediately topped the iPhone App Store Charts: reaching #1 in the Sports Chart, #3 in the Action Chart, #5 in the Games Chart, and #8 in the App Chart.

On 18 May 2012, Grubby Hands re-released an updated version of David Haye's Knockout.

They released a second David Haye game in December 2012, David Haye's Jungle Rumble, which went immediately to the top of the charts.

=== Boy Loves Girl ===
On 1 August 2011, Grubby Hands started developing their second iPhone game Boy Loves Girl with its eventual release on 21 December 2011.

== Interviews with Grubby Hands ==
- Bizarre Creations: iOS Developers Risen From The Flames
- Where Are All The British Games?
- Interview: Grubby Hands Talks Sequels, David Haye and more...
- Business and Love
- Interview with Grubby Hands Company Director, Dr Danny Pearce
