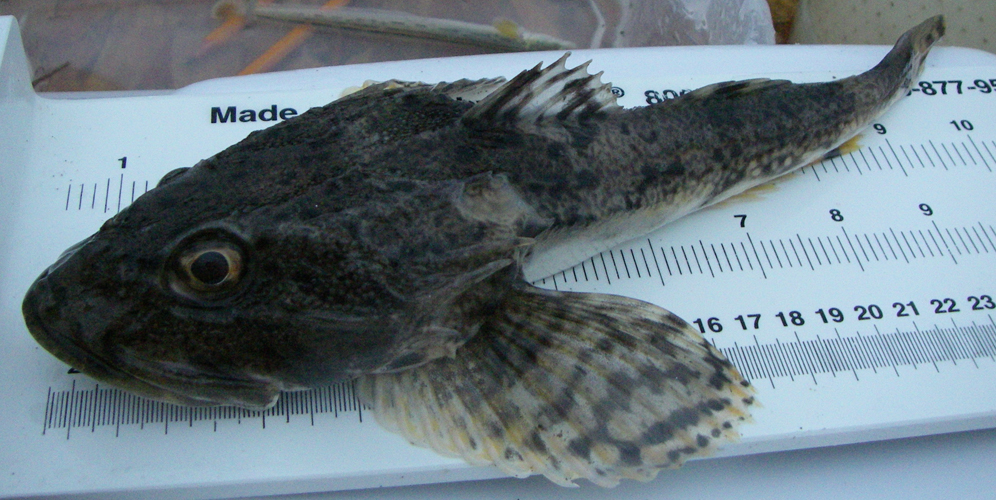
- Juvenile

Scientific classification
- Kingdom: Animalia
- Phylum: Chordata
- Class: Actinopterygii
- Order: Perciformes
- Suborder: Cottoidei
- Family: Psychrolutidae
- Genus: Myoxocephalus
- Species: M. jaok

Binomial name
- Myoxocephalus jaok (G. Cuvier, 1829)

Synonyms
- Cottus jaok Cuvier, 1820; Cottus humilis Bean, 1881; Myoxocephalus matsubarai Watanabe, 1958

= Myoxocephalus jaok =

Species of fish

Myoxocephalus jaok, the plain sculpin, is a species of marine ray-finned fish belonging to the family Cottidae, the typical sculpins. This species is found in the northern Pacific Ocean and adjacent Arctic Ocean.

== Taxonomy ==
Myoxocephalus jaok was first formally described as Cottus jaok in 1820 by the French zoologist Georges Cuvier with its type locality given as the coast of Kamchatka. The specific name, jaok, is the local name for this species in Kamchatka.

== Description ==
Myoxocephalus jaok has its dorsal fins supported by between 8 and 10 spines and between 14 and 17 soft rays while the anal fin has between 13 and 15 soft rays. The head depressed, with the upper surface having bony spines and ridges. There are rounded bony plates with serrated margins on the upper flanks. This species has a relatively narrow head with a u-shaped mouth when viewed from above. There are no cirri on the head and body and the top spine on the preoperculum is the longest and is straight and has no branches. There are many round bony spine bearing plates above the lateral line with a lesser number of smaller plates below the lateral line bearing rearward ponting spines. The lateral line is made up of three rows of pores. The overall colour is grey and brown with numerous small black spots and there may be indistinct dark bands. This species reaches a maximum published total length of 74 cm (29 in) and a maximum weight of 8.0 kg (17.6 lb).

== Distribution and habitat ==
Myoxocephalus jaok is found in the northern Pacific Ocean from the Sea of Japan and the Sea of Okhotsk through the Kuril Islands to southeastern Kamchatka and the western Bering Sea, including the eastern Aleutian Islands and from the Gulf of Alaska, north onto the eastern Chukchi Sea and the western Beaufort Sea. This species occurs in shallow waters where it is a demersal fish found on sandy and muddy substrates from the intertidal zone down to depths of typically less than 80 m (260 ft); rarely caught at depths greater than 150 m (490 ft).

== Biology ==
Myoxocephalus jaok has a catholic diet with over 100 different types of food item having been identified, although fish and decapods are the most important items. The fish taken include flatfishes, Alaska pollock (Theragra chalcogramma), Pacific sand lance (Ammodytes hexapterus) other cottids. The Decapoda include crabs such as Chionoecetes opilio, Hyas coarctatus and Telmessus cheiragonus as well as shrimps from the family Crangonidae. This species is an ambush predator, varying its diet with age, size season and opportunity. They spawn between December and March when the females lay eggs on plants and in mussel clusters in shallow waters and these are guarded by the males until they hatch. They young fish settle in waters close to the shore from the May following hatching. At least some adults migrate to shallow inshore waters in the summer and retreat to deeper waters in winter.
