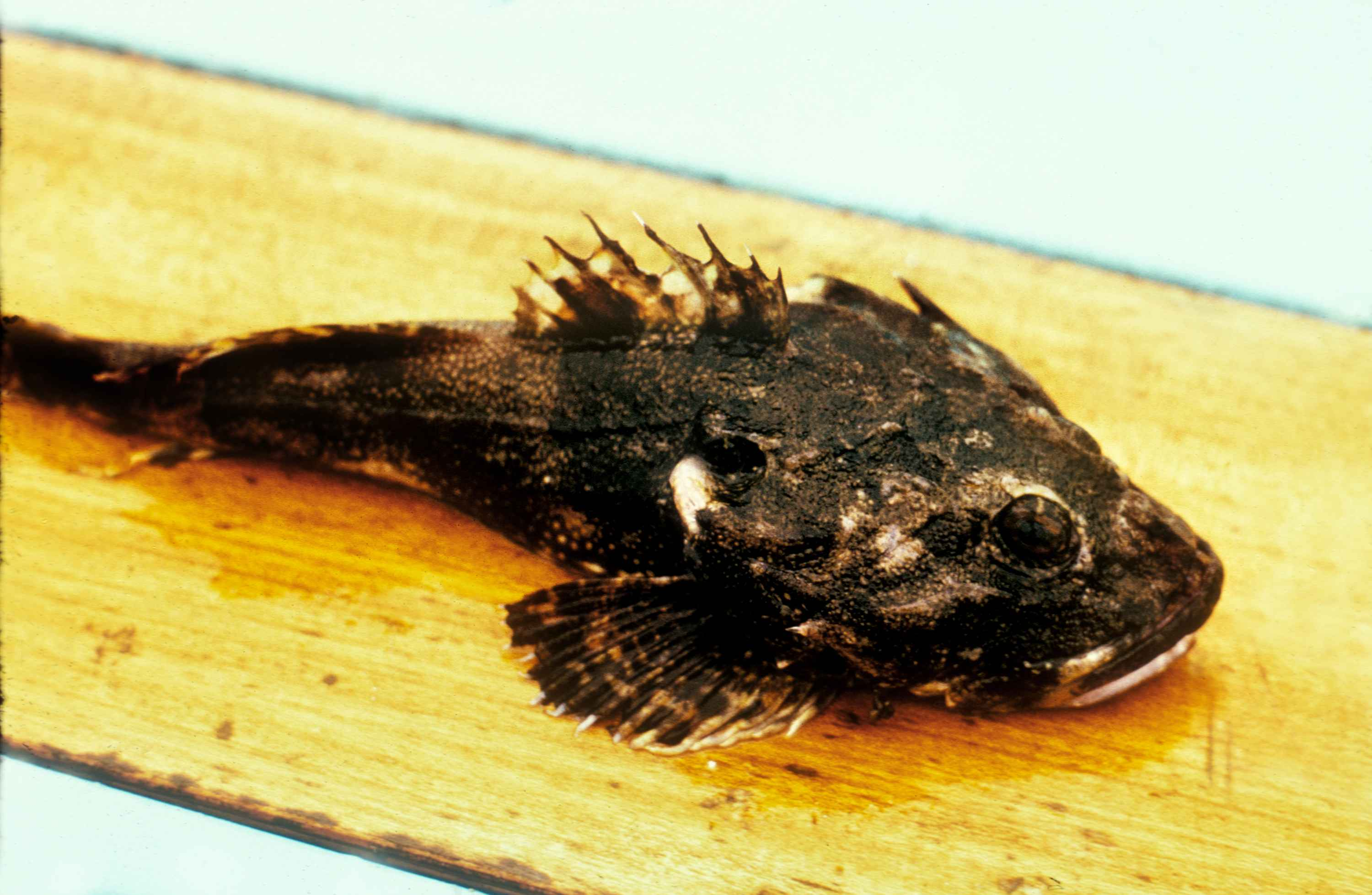

Scientific classification
- Kingdom: Animalia
- Phylum: Chordata
- Class: Actinopterygii
- Order: Perciformes
- Suborder: Cottoidei
- Family: Psychrolutidae
- Genus: Myoxocephalus
- Species: M. polyacanthocephalus

Binomial name
- Myoxocephalus polyacanthocephalus (Pallas, 1814)

Synonyms
- Cottus polyacanthocephalus Pallas, 1814; Ainocottus ensiger Jordan & Starks, 1904

= Myoxocephalus polyacanthocephalus =

Species of fish

Myoxocephalus polyacanthocephalus, the great sculpin, is a species of marine ray-finned fish belonging to the family Cottidae, the typical sculpins. It is found in the North Pacific Ocean from the Bering Sea and the Aleutian Islands, and extends from Hokkaido and the Kamchatka Peninsula to the Puget Sound, Washington. It is the largest member of the genus Myoxocephalus and the second most common in the Bering Sea. It can grow to a size of 80 cm and 9 kg weight.

Myoxocephalus polyacanthocephalus is a predatory fish. It has acellular bones.
