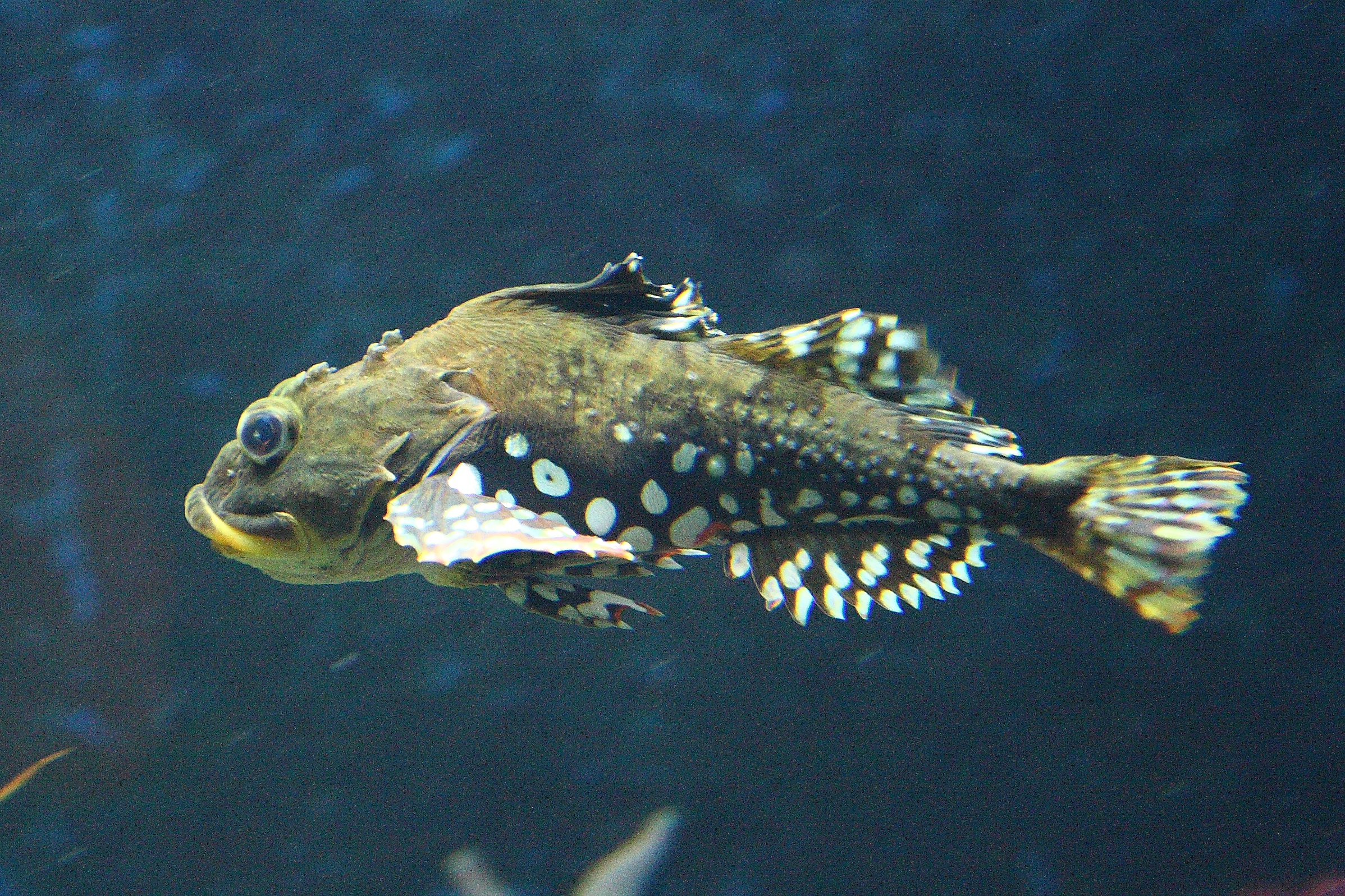
- Myoxocephalus scorpius

Scientific classification
- Kingdom: Animalia
- Phylum: Chordata
- Class: Actinopterygii
- Division: Teleostei
- Order: Perciformes
- Suborder: Cottoidei
- Superfamily: Cottoidea
- Family: Psychrolutidae
- Genus: Myoxocephalus; Tilesius, 1811

Type species
- Myoxocephalus stelleri Tilesius, 1811

Synonyms
- Acanthocottus Girard, 1850; Ainocottus Jordan & Starks, 1904; Boreocottus Gill, 1859; Littocottus Neelov, 1979; Onchocottus Gill, 1861; Oncocottus Gill, 1862; Ptyonotus Günther, 1860; Triglopsis Girard, 1851

= Myoxocephalus =

Myoxocephalus Temporal range: Middle Miocene to present Possible Early Oligocene record

Genus of fishes

Myoxocephalus is a genus of marine ray-finned fishes belonging to the cottoid family Psychrolutidae, the marine sculpins. They are found in the northern Pacific, Arctic and Atlantic Oceans, with a few species in lakes.

== Taxonomy ==
Myoxocephalus was first proposed as a monospecific genus in 1811 by Tilesius when he described Myoxocephalus stelleri from Kamchatka. The 5th edition of Fishes of the World (2016) still classified this genus in the subfamily Cottinae of the family Cottidae but more recently it has been classified in the subfamily Myoxocephalinae of the family Psychrolutidae.

== Species ==
There are currently 15 recognized species in this genus:

- Myoxocephalus aenaeus (Mitchill, 1814) (Grubby)
- Myoxocephalus brandtii (Steindachner, 1867) (Snowy sculpin)
- Myoxocephalus jaok (G. Cuvier, 1829) (Plain sculpin)
- Myoxocephalus niger (T. H. Bean, 1881) (Warthead sculpin)
- Myoxocephalus ochotensis (P. J. Schmidt, 1929)
- Myoxocephalus octodecemspinosus (Mitchill, 1815) (Longhorn sculpin)
- Myoxocephalus polyacanthocephalus (Pallas, 1814) (Great sculpin)
- Myoxocephalus quadricornis (Linnaeus, 1758) (Fourhorn sculpin)
- Myoxocephalus scorpioides (O. Fabricius, 1780) (Arctic sculpin)
- Myoxocephalus scorpius (Linnaeus, 1758) (Shorthorn sculpin)
- Myoxocephalus sinensis (Sauvage, 1873) (Chinese sculpin)
- Myoxocephalus stelleri (Tilesius, 1811) (Steller's sculpin)
- Myoxocephalus thompsonii (Girard, 1851) (Deepwater sculpin)
- Myoxocephalus tuberculatus (Soldatov & Pavlenko, 1922)
- Myoxocephalus verrucosus (Bean, 1891) (Warty sculpin)

Synonyms

- Myoxocephalus matsubarai Watanabe, 1958; valid as M. jaok
- Myoxocephalus yesoensis Snyder, 1911; valid as M. brandtii

In addition, the following fossil species are known:

- †Myoxocephalus aculeatus Schwarzhans et al, 2026 (Late Oligocene-aged Brejning Formation of Denmark)
- †Myoxocephalus antiquus Smith, 1975 (Pliocene-aged Glenns Ferry Formation of Idaho, USA)
- †Myoxocephalus idahoensis Smith, 1975 (Pliocene-aged Glenns Ferry Formation of Idaho, USA)
- †Myoxocephalus primas (Koken, 1891) (Early Oligocene of Belgium and Germany) [otolith]

Indeterminate remains of a marine Myoxocephalus are also known from the Middle Miocene-aged Kurasi Formation of Sakhalin, Russia.

In 2020 workers undertook a comparison of the Mitochondrial DNA of the fourhorn sculpin and the belligerent sculpin (Megalcottus platycephalus) and found that the fourhorn sculpin was more closely related to the belligerent sculpin than it was to the other species in the genus Myoxocephalus, they proposed that the fourhorn sculpin be reclassified as a member of the genus Megalocottus.

== Characteristics ==
Myoxocephalus sculpins have a no scales above the lateral line, which lacks bony plates, on the body, which may be naked or have bony plates, scutes or small, sharp spines. The head is large and deep and has a covering of thick skin, there are no bony granulations on the head bit some species have warty knobs or skin flaps. The head has thin sensory canals. The upper spine on the preoperculum is elongated with a wide base and points diagonally upwards. The upper jaw clearly projects beyond the lower and there are vomerine teeth but no palatine teeth. There is always a slit behind d the fourth gill arch but this may be reduced to a pore. The spiny dorsal fin is slight larger or similar in size to the soft-rayed dorsal fin and they are connected. In males the pelvic fins typically do not extend as far as the anus. The soft rays of the dorsal, anal and pectoral fins are simple. These sculpins are relatively large, the largest species is the great sculpin with a maximum published total length of 80 cm (31 in) while the smallest is the grubby with a maximum published total length of 18 cm (7.1 in).

== Distribution and habitat ==
Myoxocephalus sculpins are found in the northern Pacific and Atlantic Oceans and the Arctic Ocean. There are cases where they have become landlocked in lakes. They are fishes of the coast and continental shelf and many species can tolerate low salinities and they are found over sand, mud or rocks.

== Biology ==
Myoxocephalus Sculpins are predators on fishes and benthic invertebrates. They spawn in winter and spring, laying demersal eggs which the males guard.
