= Grubby (opossum) =

Popular invasive opossum (2022–2025)

- Grubby during her time at the Alaska Zoo
- Other name: Ophelia
- Species: Virginia opossum
- Sex: Female
- Born: c. 2022
- Died: October 11, 2025 (aged 3.5); Anchorage, Alaska, United States

Grubby (c. 2022 – October 11, 2025) was a Virginia opossum that traveled from somewhere in the state of Washington to Homer, Alaska, in a shipping container and eluded authorities for over a month, delivering a litter of joeys in the process. Opossums are considered an invasive species in Alaska. Grubby died on October 11, 2025, at the age of 3.

== Biography ==
=== Origin ===
Based on her estimated age of 3.5 years at the time of her death, Grubby's date of birth can be estimated to be around April 2022. The container on which she arrived originated in Washington State.

=== Initial capture, escape, and recapture ===
Grubby was first spotted in Homer in a shipping container delivered to the local Spenard Builders Supply store in the spring of 2023. Store employees were unsure what to do with an opossum, so they contacted the local animal shelter. The shelter in turn contacted the Alaska Department of Fish and Game (ADF&G), which advised the shelter to attempt to trap the animal and provide it to them. The shelter did manage to trap the opossum, but it subsequently escaped and was on the loose in central Homer for several weeks before being spotted by local police outside their station on Grubstake Avenue, inspiring the name "Grubby". When it became public knowledge that there was an opossum loose in Homer, the animal became a local topic of debate, with some favoring trapping and destroying the opossum while others showed enthusiastic support for saving Grubby, or even electing Grubby as mayor. Some local businesses offered opossum-themed sales and a "Free Grubby" hashtag trended on local social media groups.

In May 2023, a Homer police officer did manage to trap Grubby. Due to the public interest in the matter, she was handed over to the Alaska Zoo to reside in their invasive species collection instead of being euthanized. There, she was renamed 'Ophelia'. Grubby died on October 11, 2025, of complications from old age. The zoo estimated her age to be 3.5 years at the time of her death.

=== Offspring ===
Shortly after Grubby's relocation to the Alaska Zoo in 2023, there were more opossum sightings in Homer, and it became clear that Grubby had given birth to a litter of joeys, leading to a much more intensive trapping operation in Homer by ADF&G. Residents were advised to keep pets indoors while live trapping was taking place. By June 5, 2023, three joeys had been captured, but with opossums having an average litter size of nine to thirteen joeys, biologists continued trapping efforts. On June 13 it was reported that five joeys had been captured, but local ADF&G biologist Jason Herreman stated, "No matter what, unless we catch 13 of 'em, I wouldn't ever really be comfortable to say we got them all." One of the offspring, nicknamed "Homer", was later relocated to the Oregon Zoo in December 2023.
