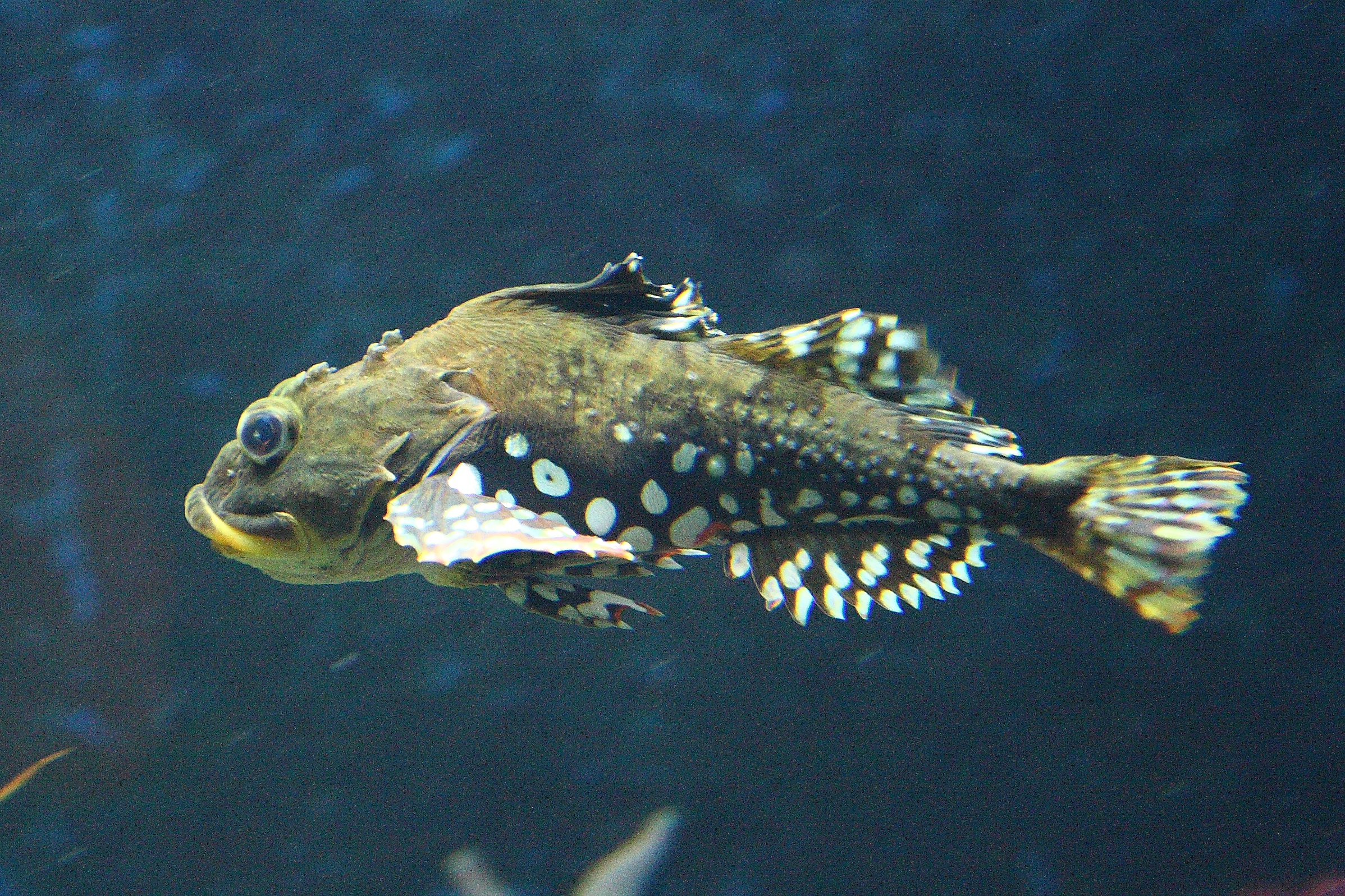

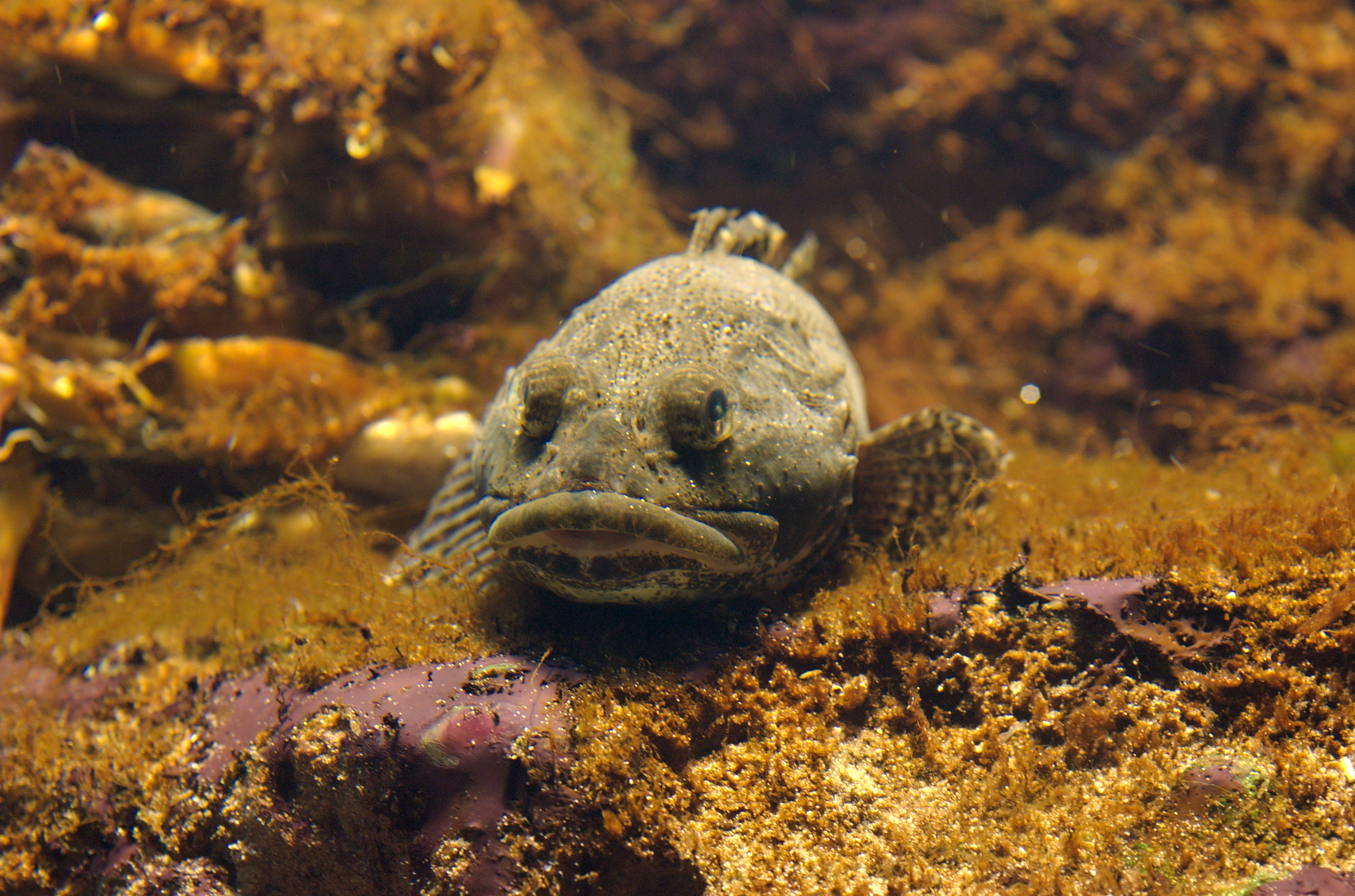

Conservation status
- Least Concern (IUCN 3.1)

Scientific classification
- Kingdom: Animalia
- Phylum: Chordata
- Class: Actinopterygii
- Order: Perciformes
- Suborder: Cottoidei
- Family: Psychrolutidae
- Genus: Myoxocephalus
- Species: M. scorpius

Binomial name
- Myoxocephalus scorpius (Linnaeus, 1758)

Synonyms
- Cottus scorpius Linnaeus, 1758; Acanthocottus scorpius (Linnaeus, 1758); Myoxocephalus scorpius scorpius (Linnaeus, 1758); Cottus groenlandicus Cuvier, 1829; Myoxocephalus scorpius groenlandicus (Cuvier, 1829); Cottus verrucosus Bean, 1881; Myoxocephalus verrucosus (Bean, 1881)

= Myoxocephalus scorpius =

Species of fish

Myoxocephalus scorpius, typically known as the shorthorn sculpin or bull-rout, is a species of fish in the family Cottidae. It is a demersal species of the Northern Atlantic and adjacent subarctic and Arctic seas. The species has many English names that are used less frequently or in small parts of its range, including Arctic sculpin, daddy sculpin, European sculpin, father-lasher, goat sculpin, Greenland sculpin, guffy, horny whore, pig-fish, scully, scummy, short-spined sea scorpion and warty sculpin.

== Appearance ==
It reaches maturity at 15–30 cm (6–12 in) in length and specimens from the Arctic and subarctic, which grow to the largest size, can reach up to 60 cm (24 in). The fish has a squat appearance, a large spiny head and a tapering body. It is a mottled grey-brown in colour but can be darker, including black as base colouring. It has a large mouth and spiny gill covers.

The shorthorn sculpin is not venomous, but it can be mistaken for similar looking venomous fishes, notably scorpionfish.

== Habitat and behaviour ==
The shorthorn sculpin is found among seaweed or on rocky bottoms with mud or sand from 0 to 451 m (0–1,480 ft). Although primarily a marine species, it also occurs in brackish waters like the Baltic Sea. Like some other coldwater fish, it has antifreeze proteins, which allow it to survive at temperatures around or slightly below freezing.

It was known that sculpin have been affected by heavy metal exposure in West Greenland by a former lead (Pb) - zinc (Zn) mine. Through analysing samples of three different sites, a positive correlation was found between fish at a closer distance to the mine and mucus secretion. This mucus creates a layer over the body that can cause respiratory stress, irregular swimming, and also affects their relationships with parasites. Researchers are hoping to use this mucosal mapping to help better understand effects of contaminant and parasite exposure for future studies.

They feed on a wide range of demersal and benthic fishes and crustaceans.

The shorthorn sculpin spawns in December through March, the eggs being laid on between rocks in a clump protected by the male. They usually hatch in five weeks.
