= Halibut =

Large edible flatfishes

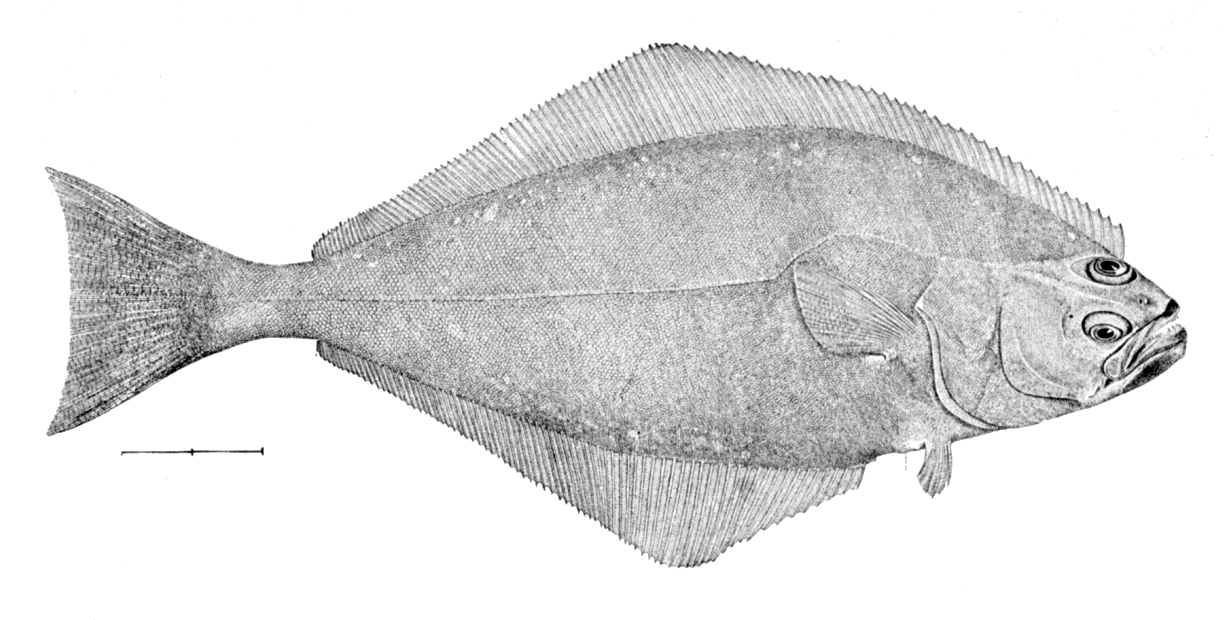
Atlantic halibut

Halibut is the common name for three species of flatfish in the family of right-eye flounders. In some regions, and less commonly, other species of large flatfish are also referred to as halibut.

The word is derived from haly (holy) and butte (flat fish), for its popularity on Catholic holy days. Halibut are demersal fish and are highly regarded as a food fish as well as a sport fish.

== Species ==
A 2018 cladistic analysis based on genetics and morphology showed that the Greenland halibut diverged from a lineage that gave rise to the Atlantic and Pacific halibuts. The common ancestor of all three diverged from a lineage that gave rise to the genus Verasper, comprising the spotted halibut and barfin flounder.

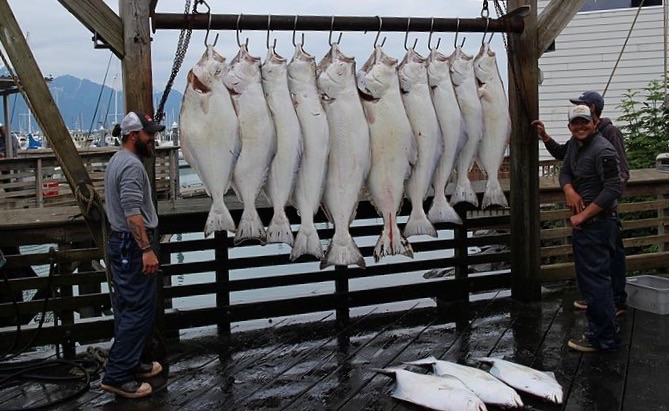
Fishermen in Seward, Alaska, with a fresh catch of halibut

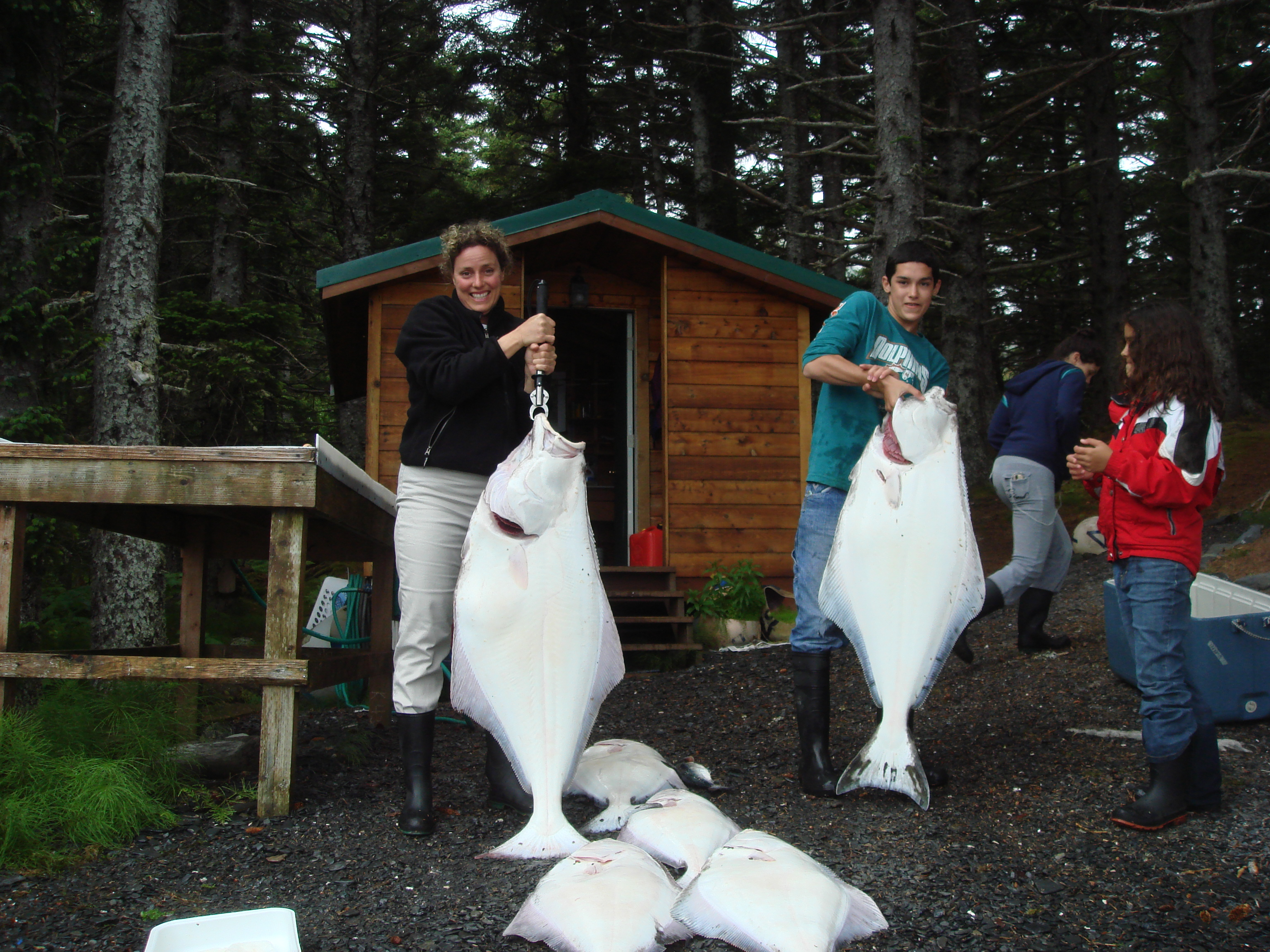
Halibut caught off the coast of Raspberry Island, Alaska, in 2007: The two fish being held up are 18 to 23 kg (40 to 50 lb)

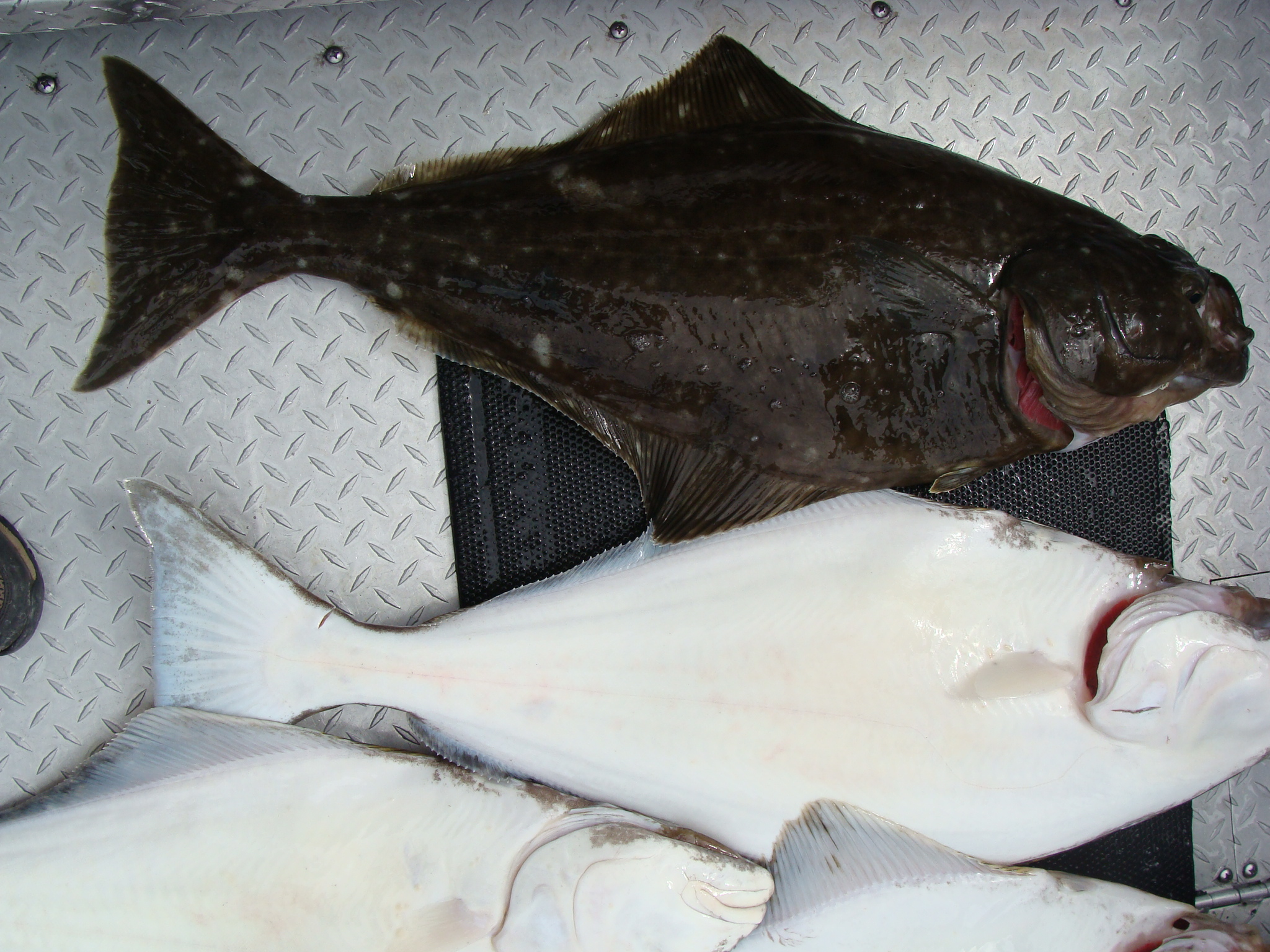
Halibut tend to be a mottled dark brown on their upward-facing side and white on their underside

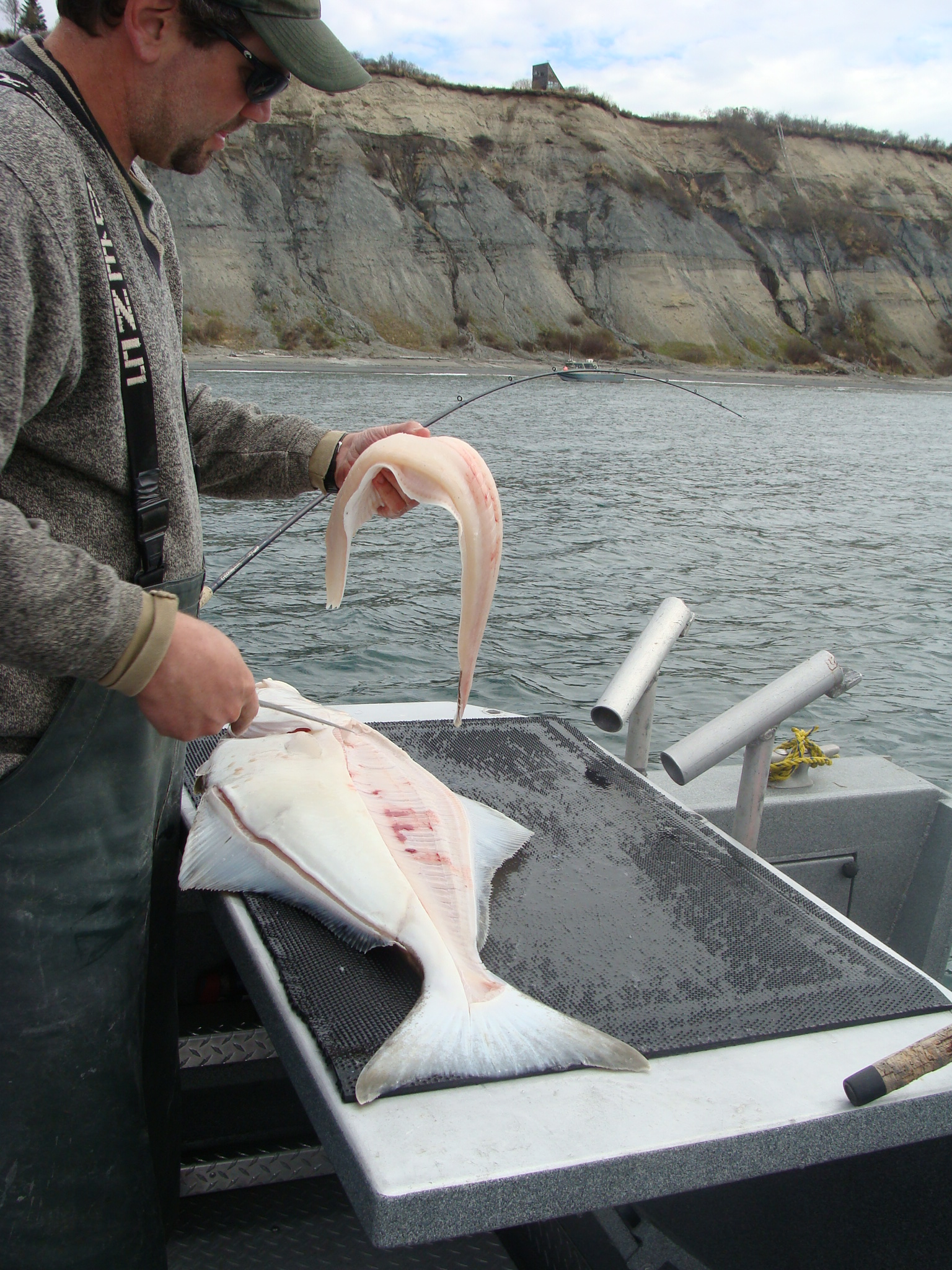
Filleting a Pacific halibut taken in Cook Inlet, Alaska. A halibut yields four large fillets, with the yield percentage higher than for most fish. Round halibut cheeks may provide additional meat

- Genus Hippoglossus
  - Atlantic halibut, Hippoglossus hippoglossus – lives in the North Atlantic
  - Pacific halibut, Hippoglossus stenolepis – lives in the North Pacific Ocean
- Genus Reinhardtius
  - Greenland halibut, Reinhardtius hippoglossoides – lives in the cold northern Atlantic, northern Pacific, and Arctic Oceans

== Physical characteristics ==
The Pacific and Atlantic halibut are the world's largest flatfish, with debate over which grows larger. Halibut are dark brown on the top side with a white to off-white underbelly and have very small scales, invisible to the naked eye, embedded in their skin. Halibut are symmetrical at birth with one eye on each side of the head. Then, about six months later, during larval metamorphosis one eye migrates to the other side of the head. The eyes are permanently set once the skull is fully ossified. At the same time, the stationary-eyed side darkens to match the top side, while the other side remains white. This color scheme disguises halibut from above (blending with the ocean floor) and from below (blending into the light from the sky) and is known as countershading.

The IGFA size record for halibut was apparently broken off the waters of Norway in July 2013 by a 234-kilogram (515-pound), 2.62-metre (8-foot-7-inch) fish. This was awaiting certification as of 2013. In July 2014, a 219-kilogram (482 lb) Pacific halibut was caught in Glacier Bay, Alaska; this is, however, discounted from records because the halibut was shot and harpooned before being hauled aboard.

== Diet ==
Halibut feed on almost any fish or animal they can fit into their mouths. Juvenile halibut feed on small crustaceans and other bottom-dwelling organisms. Animals found in their stomachs include sand lance, octopus, crab, salmon, hermit crabs, lamprey, sculpin, cod, pollock, herring, and flounder, as well as other halibut. Halibut live at depths ranging from a few meters to hundreds of meters, and although they spend most of their time near the bottom, halibut may move up in the water column to feed. In most ecosystems, the halibut is near the top of the marine food chain. In the North Pacific, common predators are sea lions, killer whales, salmon sharks and humans.

== Sex-determining genes ==
Halibut species vary in sex determination systems. The Atlantic halibut went down a purely XX/XY route, with the male being heterogametic, around 0.9 to 3.8 million years ago. The sex-determining gene for the Atlantic halibut is likely to be gsdf on chromosome 13. The Pacific halibut went down a ZZ/ZW route, with the female being heterogametic, around 4.5 million years ago. The master sex-determining gene of the Pacific halibut is located on chromosome 9 and it is likely to be bmpr1ba. The gene sox2 is likely to play the same role in the Greenland halibut.

== Halibut fishery ==
The North Pacific commercial halibut fishery dates to the late 19th century and today is one of the region's largest and most lucrative. In Canadian and US waters, long-line fishing predominates, using chunks of octopus ("devilfish") or other bait on circle hooks attached at regular intervals to a weighted line that can extend for several miles across the bottom. The fishing vessel retrieves the line after several hours to a day. The effects of long-line gear on habitats are poorly understood, but could include disturbance of sediments, benthic structures, and other structures.

International management is thought to be necessary, because the species occupies waters of the United States, Canada, Russia, and possibly Japan (where the species is known to the Japanese as ohyo), and matures slowly. Halibut do not reproduce until age eight, when about 80 cm (30 in) long, so commercial capture below this length prevents breeding and is against US and Canadian regulations supporting sustainability. Pacific halibut fishing is managed by the International Pacific Halibut Commission.

For most of the modern era, halibut fishery operated as a derby. Regulators declared time slots when fishing was open (typically 24–48 hours at a time) and fishermen raced to catch as many pounds as they could within that interval. This approach accommodated unlimited participation in the fishery while allowing regulators to control the quantity of fish caught annually by controlling the number and timing of openings. However, it led to unsafe fishing, as openings were necessarily set before the weather was known, forcing fishermen to leave port regardless of the weather. These derbies also meant fresh halibut was only on the market during several different weeks distributed throughout the year where the surge in supply would limit the price that could be set, therefore diminishing the income of halibut fishermen.

=== Individual fishing quotas ===
In 1995, US regulators allocated individual fishing quotas (IFQs) to existing fishery participants based on each vessel's documented historical catch. IFQs grant to holders a specific proportion of each year's total allowable catch (TAC). The fishing season is about eight months. The IFQ system improved both safety and product quality by providing a stable flow of fresh halibut to the marketplace. Critics of the program suggest, since holders can sell their quota and the fish are a public resource, the IFQ system gave a public resource to the private sector. The fisheries were managed through a treaty between the United States and Canada per recommendations of the International Pacific Halibut Commission, formed in 1923.

A significant sport fishery in Alaska and British Columbia has emerged, where halibut are prized game and food fish. Sport fisherman use large rods and reels with 35–70 kg (80–150 lb) line, and often bait with herring, large jigs, or whole salmon heads. Halibut are strong and fight strenuously when exposed to air. Smaller fish will usually be pulled on board with a gaff and may be clubbed or even punched in the head to prevent them from thrashing around on the deck. In both commercial and sport fisheries, standard procedure is to shoot or otherwise subdue very large halibut over 70–90 kg (150–200 lb) before landing them.

=== Overfishing and population decline ===
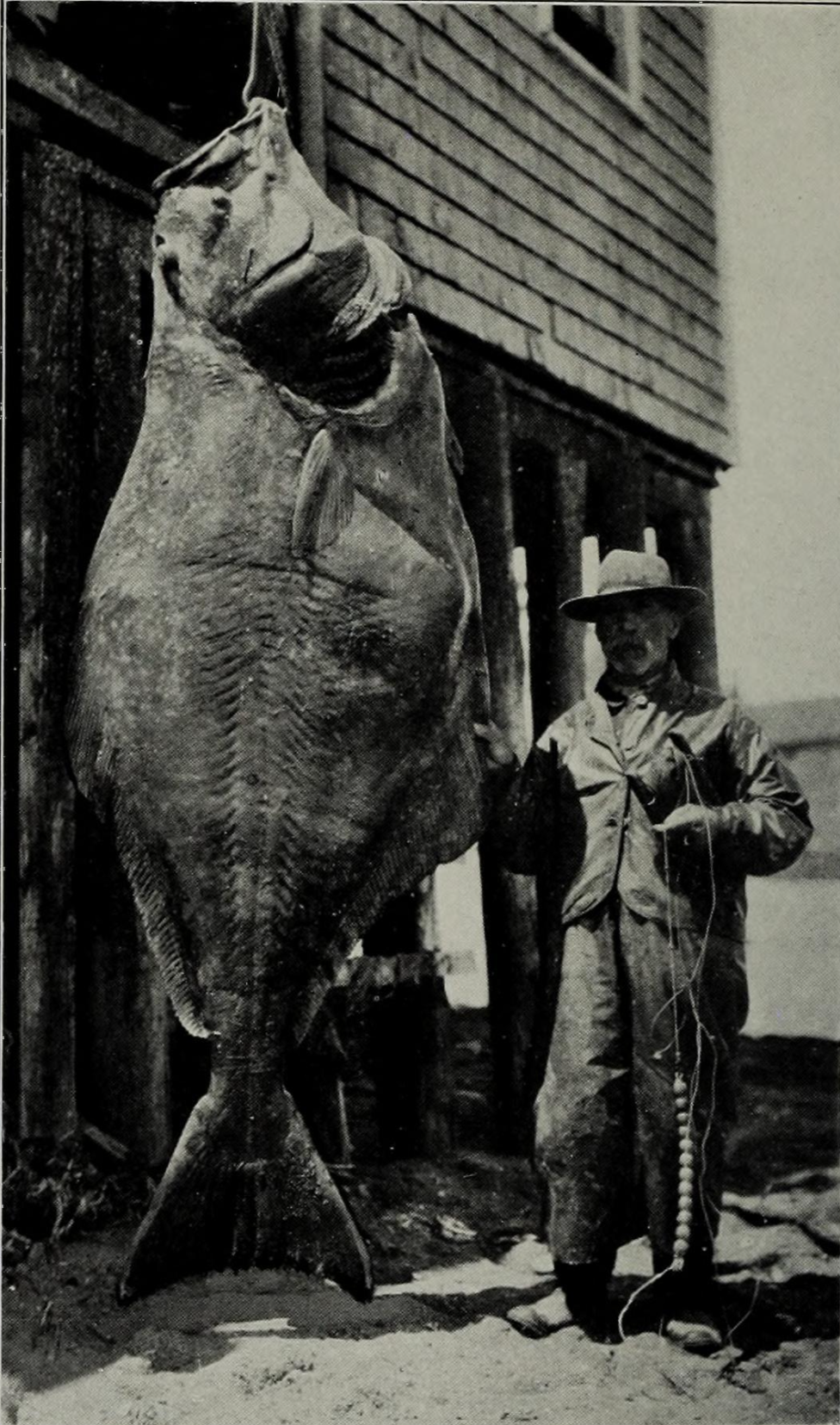
A 272 lb (123 kg) halibut caught in the early 20th century

The Atlantic halibut has been a major target of fishing since the 1840s with overfishing causing the depletion of the species in the Georges Bank in 1850, then all the way up to the Canadian Arctic in 1866. In the 1940s the American fishing industry collapsed but the Canadian fishing industry remained until there was a decline in Canadian halibut fishery in the 1970s and 1980s. This allowed the halibut population to briefly rebound before collapsing in the 1990s. Since a low point in the early 2000s, the population has rebounded once again and may be stabilizing, but the species is not nearly as abundant in most locations as it was in the early 1800s.

=== Atlantic halibut population ===
Currently, Atlantic halibut is managed as two stocks in Canadian waters, which are the Atlantic Continental Shelf stock and the Gulf of St. Lawrence stock. The Atlantic halibut has two other stocks in the Northwest Atlantic, those being the Gulf of Maine-Georges Bank stock controlled by the United States and one controlled by France near the Saint-Pierre and Miquelon Archipelago. The Georges Bank stock is still considered to be depleted and it is listed as a species of concern in the United States. In the two main populations of Atlantic halibut there are many subpopulations, but many have been lost due to patches of extreme overfishing and the populations remain depleted as a whole from what they were in the 1800s.

=== Pacific and Greenland halibut populations ===
The Pacific halibut and Greenland halibut have not had this level of fragmentation, and their population is far larger in the United States' waters, with North Pacific halibut and groundfish fisheries extracting the largest volume of catch out of all United States fishery areas. Sometimes the California halibut is mistaken for a subspecies, but they are not, and are not even a true halibut species. In the North Atlantic, observation of migration indicates that there are only two major populations of Greenland halibut that both stretch vast distances. Those populations being the Northeast one stretching from the Kara Sea to Greenland, and the Northwest one stretching from Newfoundland to Baffin Bay. These stocks had been previously thought to be four different populations, but migration has indicated that they are only two different populations, and that fishing has not fragmented them. New research also indicates that the Greenland halibut originally came from the Pacific Ocean and spread into the Arctic Basin when the Bering Strait opened for a second time around 3 million years ago, and thus the Pacific halibut is its closest living relative.

=== Evolutionary diversification of fragmented populations ===
In the Atlantic halibut studies have shown that the Atlantic Continental Shelf stock and the Gulf of St. Lawrence stock have begun to differentiate genetically from each other due to low connectivity between populations, low rates of exchange, and subsequent adaptation to local environments. Some adaptations can show up as changes in life-history trait parameters, which can change on a faster time scale than evolution and cause behavioural segregation. This can occur even in areas with enough genetic mixing to prevent genetic divergence. One small but significant observed adaptation difference in the Atlantic halibut has been that the fish in the warmer Scotian Shelf have a faster growth rate than the halibut in the colder southern Grand Banks. The Pacific halibut population remains largely genetically homologous throughout their range, but there is some variation of life-history traits on a geographic gradient. Despite its large range, the populations of Greenland halibut remain largely homogenous due to a lack of barriers for gene flow between its four major populations. There are small differences between subpopulations due to differing environmental factors, such as salinity and temperature gradients, but not to the degree seen in Atlantic halibut, as gene flow and migration continues throughout many different stocks.

== As food ==
Halibut, Atlantic and Pacific, raw
Nutritional value per 100 g (3.5 oz)
- Energy: 380 kJ (91 kcal)
- Carbohydrates: 0 g
- Sugars: 0 g
- Dietary fiber: 0 g
- Fat: 1.3 g
- Protein: 18.6 g
Vitamins and minerals
| Vitamins | Quantity %DV^{†} |
| Vitamin A | 67 IU |
| Thiamine (B1) | 4% 0.05 mg |
| Riboflavin (B2) | 2% 0.03 mg |
| Niacin (B3) | 41% 6.5 mg |
| Vitamin B6 | 32% 0.55 mg |
| Folate (B9) | 3% 12 μg |
| Vitamin B12 | 46% 1.1 μg |
| Vitamin C | 0% 0 mg |
| Vitamin D | 24% 190 IU |
| Vitamin E | 4% 0.61 mg |
| Minerals | Quantity %DV^{†} |
| Calcium | 1% 7 mg |
| Iron | 1% 0.2 mg |
| Magnesium | 5% 23 mg |
| Manganese | 0% 0.01 mg |
| Phosphorus | 19% 236 mg |
| Potassium | 15% 435 mg |
| Selenium | 83% 45.6 μg |
| Sodium | 3% 68 mg |
| Zinc | 4% 0.4 mg |
- Other constituents: Quantity
- Water: 80.3 g
- Cholesterol: 49 mg
- Link to USDA Database entry
- ^{†}Percentages estimated using US recommendations for adults, except for potassium, which is estimated based on expert recommendation from the National Academies.

=== Nutrition ===
Raw Pacific or Atlantic halibut meat is 80% water and 19% protein, with negligible fat and no carbohydrates (table). In a 100-gram (3 1/2-ounce) reference amount, raw halibut contains rich content (20% or more of the Daily Value, DV) of protein, selenium (65% DV), phosphorus (34% DV), vitamin D (32% DV), and several B vitamins: niacin, vitamin B6, and vitamin B12 (42–46% DV).

Cooked halibut meat – presumably through the resulting dehydration – has relatively increased protein content and reduced B vitamin content (per 100 grams), while magnesium, phosphorus, and selenium are rich in content.

=== Food preparation ===
Halibut yield large fillets from both sides of the fish, with the small round cheeks providing an additional source of meat. Halibut are often boiled, deep-fried or grilled while fresh. Smoking is more difficult with halibut meat than it is with salmon due to its ultra-low fat content. Eaten fresh, the meat has a clean taste and requires little seasoning. Halibut is noted for its dense and firm texture. Halibut have historically been an important food source to Alaska Natives and Canadian First Nations, and continue to be a key element to many coastal subsistence economies. Accommodating the competing interests of commercial, sport, and subsistence users is a challenge.

As of 2008, the Atlantic population was so depleted through overfishing that it might be declared an endangered species. According to Seafood Watch, consumers should avoid Atlantic halibut. Most halibut eaten on the East Coast of the United States is from the Pacific.

In 2012, sport fishermen in Cook Inlet reported increased instances of a condition known as "mushy halibut syndrome". The meat of the affected fish has a "jelly-like" consistency. When cooked it does not flake in the normal manner of halibut but rather falls apart. The meat is still perfectly safe to eat but the appearance and consistency are considered unappetizing. The exact cause of the condition is unknown but may be related to a change in diet.

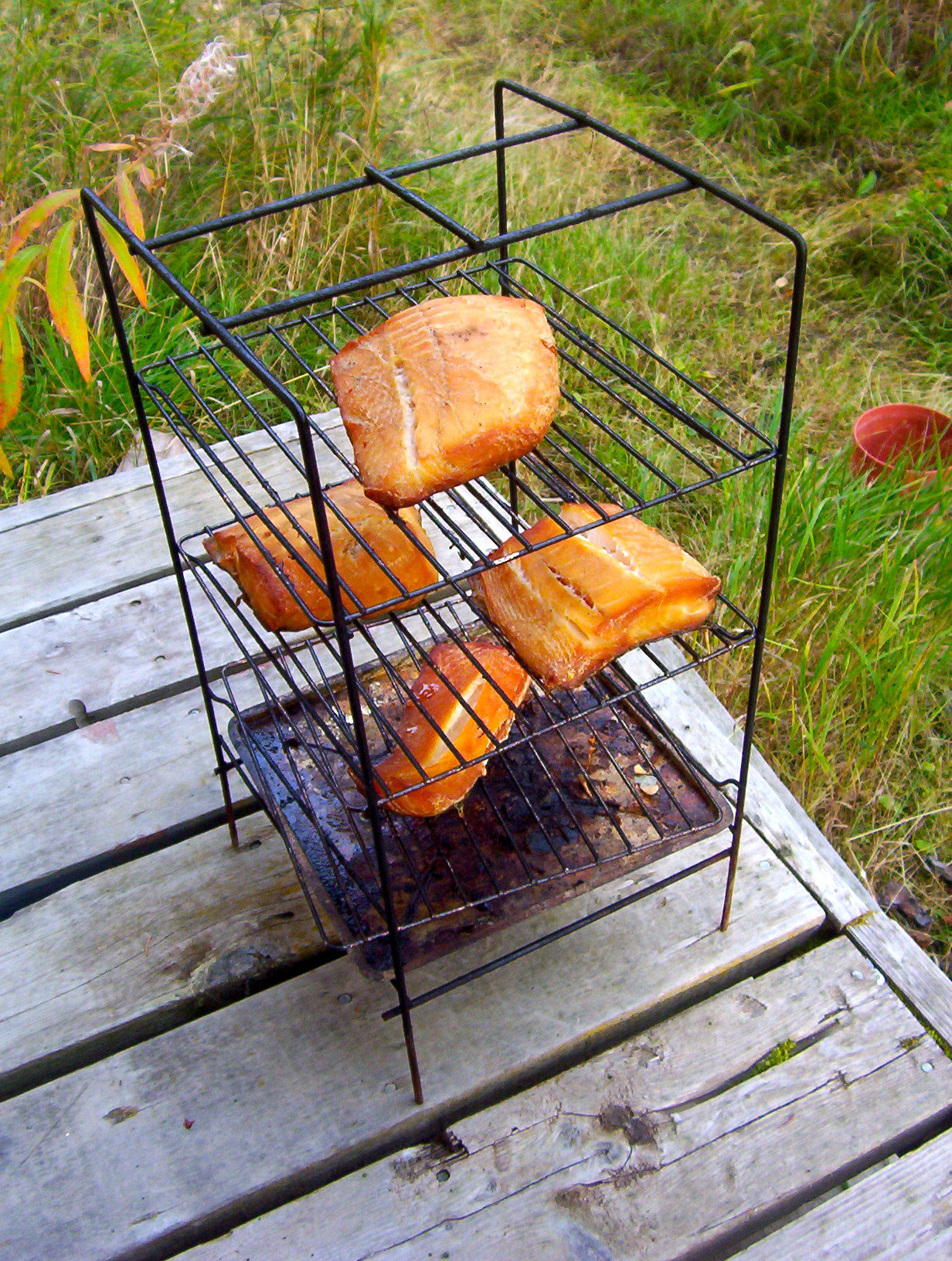
Hot smoked Pacific halibut

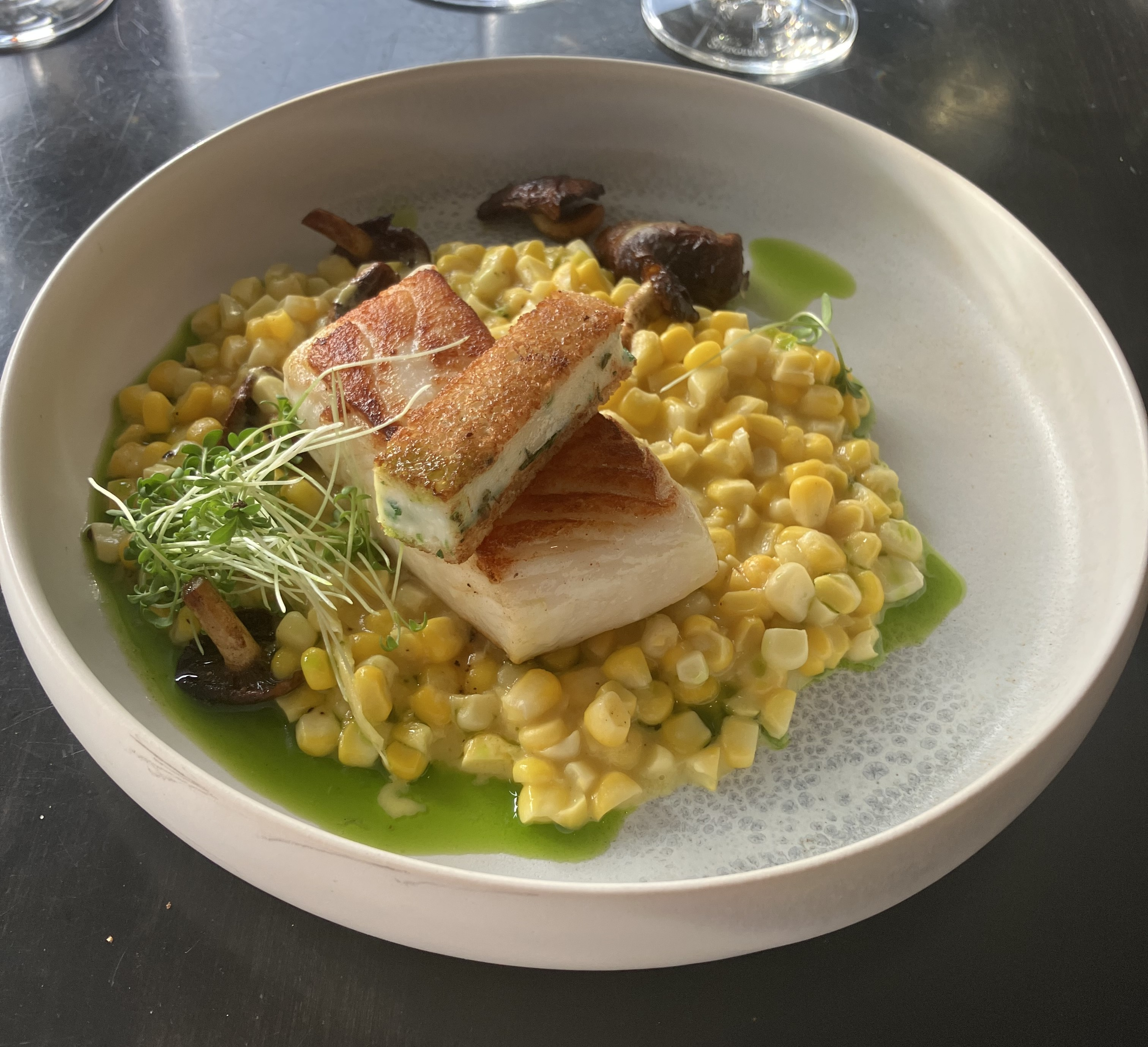
Pacific halibut with miso marinade on a corn and mushroom succotash

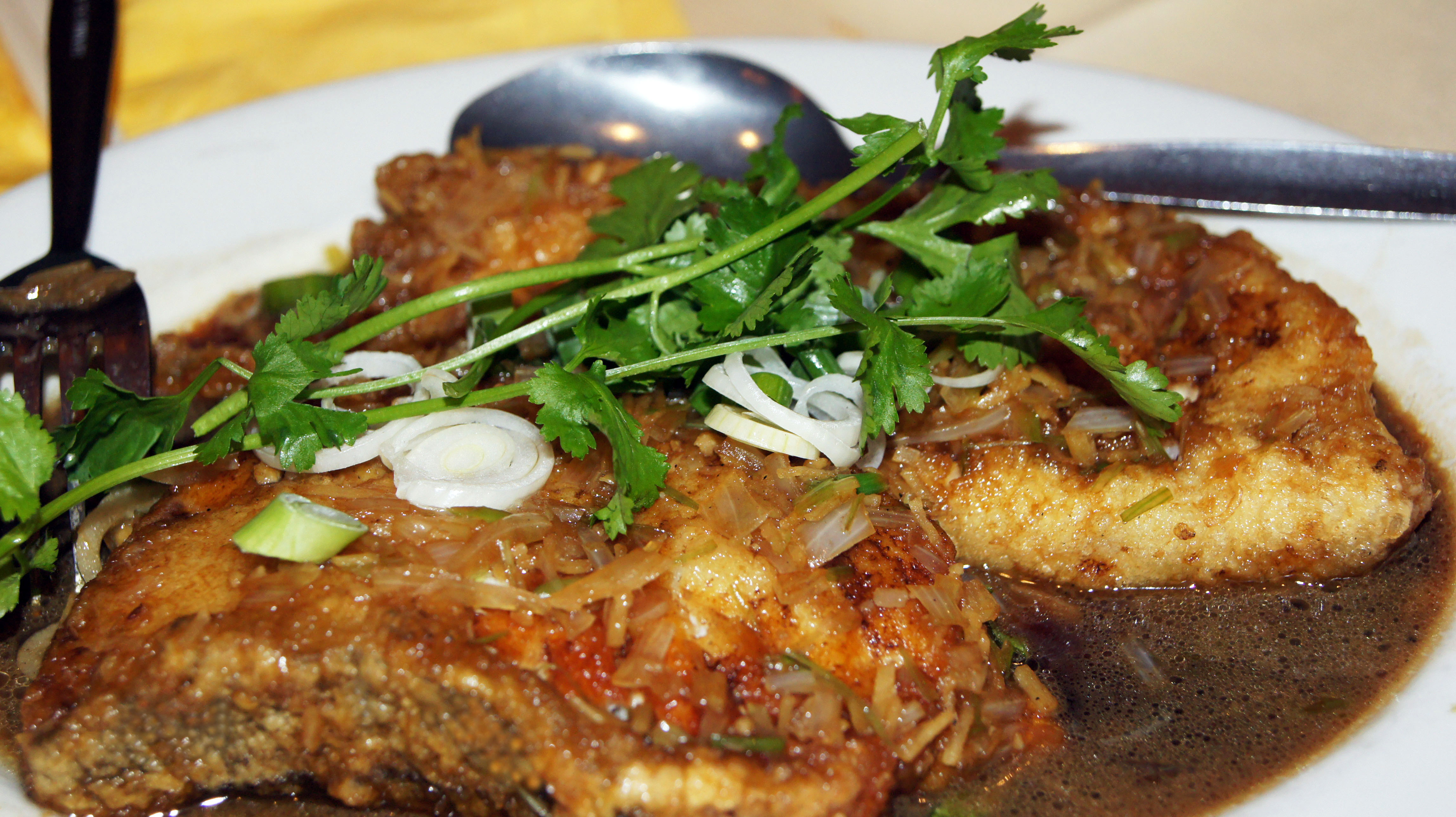
Steamed halibut in black bean sauce

== Other species sometimes called "halibut" ==
- Of the same family (Pleuronectidae) as proper halibut
  - Kamchatka flounder, Atheresthes evermanni – sometimes called "arrowtooth halibut"
  - Roundnose flounder, Eopsetta grigorjewi – often called "shotted halibut"
  - Greenland turbot, Reinhardtius hippoglossoides – often called "Greenland halibut"
  - Spotted halibut, Verasper variegatus
- Family Paralichthyidae
  - California flounder, Paralichthys californicus – sometimes called "California halibut"
  - Olive flounder, Paralichthys olivaceus – sometimes called "bastard halibut"
- Family Psettodidae
  - Psettodes erumei – sometimes called "Indian halibut"
- Family Carangidae (jack family, not a flatfish)
  - Black pomfret, Parastromateus niger – sometimes called "Australian halibut"
