= Hook set =

In recreational fishing terminology, the hookset or setting the hook is when an angler makes a sudden lifting motion to a fishing rod in order to pull the line and anchor the fish hook firmly into the mouth of a fish once it has gulped in the hook along with the bait/lure.

In order to securely tether the fish with the line, sufficient force is needed to drive the hook point through the epithelium into the connective tissue and muscle of the fish's mouth, preferably under and around a jaw bone. If this were not achieved, while it is still possible for the hook to anchor itself in to the fish's oral tissue, the likelihood of successfully landing the fish is reduced since, without the hook piercing to enough depth, the fish can shake the hook loose during struggle, spit it out and then escape. A deep enough hookset also catches more tissue (thus making it less likely to tear through the flesh), and transfers most of the deformational stress longitudinally along the shank portion of the hook (where it has the greatest tensile strength), instead of onto the bend (the curved portion of the hook) where the hook is more vulnerable to deflection and slippage when pulled by the line.

The hookset technique usually involves suddenly jerking the rod, by either an upward lift or a sweeping motion to the side, depending on the orientation of the rod at the moment the fish bites. Some fishermen will perform several hooksets in quick succession to ensure that the hook is firmly anchored, especially on tough-mouthed fish (such as some saltwater species). In contrast, anglers using circle hooks shouldn't set the hook with a vigorous action, since the hook's design allows it to slide and automatically set itself onto the fish's lip when the angler reels the line in. Timing of setting the hook is important, especially when fly fishing, as some game fish such as trout are vigilant enough to quickly realize the artificial fly is not real food and subsequently spit out the fly lure. Furthermore, it is important to act quickly so that the bait is not swallowed past the fish's pharynx, as this causes the hook to set in the gullet or gill of the fish and cause mutilating (even lethal) internal injuries to the fish, often inappropriate when practicing environmental sampling methods such as catch and release.

Using barbed hooks assist in more firmly securing the hookset, as the reverse barb point serves as an anchoring mini-hook to prevent the hook from dislodging out of the fish's tissue. However, the barb hinders angler's ability to remove the hook without causing further (and often significant) lacerations to the surrounding tissue. In situations that warrant catch and release, barbless hooks are frequently used as their withdrawal is much easier, which also means to successfully catch the fish, a harder (and thus deeper) hookset is crucial and there is a constant need to maintain a taut line tension.
