= Tube fly =

Style of artificial fly in fly fishing

- Artificial fly
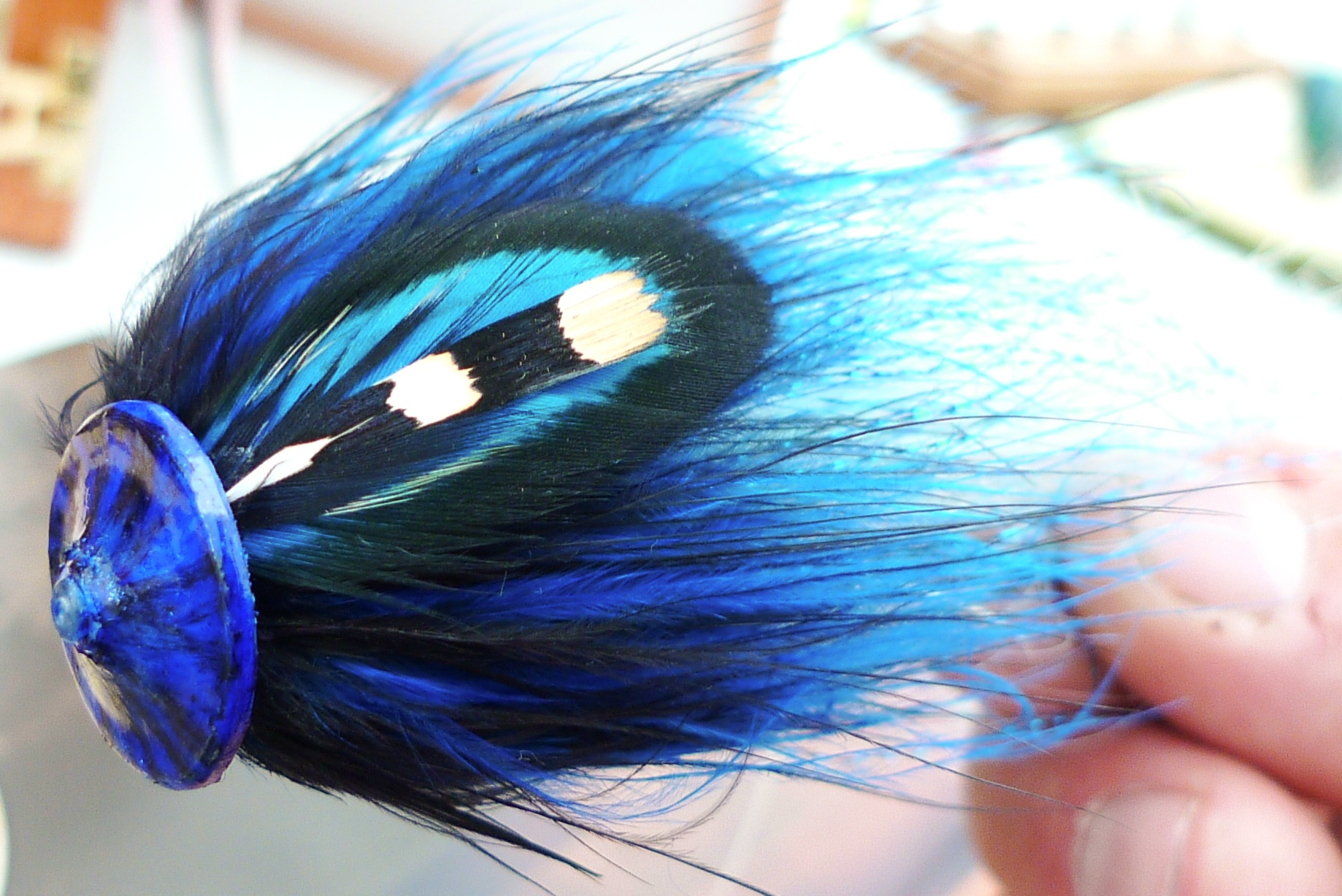
- Blue tube fly
- Type: Tube fly

History
- Creator: Winnie Morawski
- Created: ca 1945
- Body: metal tube

A tube fly is a general tying style of artificial fly used by fly anglers. Tube flies differ from traditional artificial flies as they are tied on small diameter tubes, not hooks. Tube flies were invented in Aberdeen, Scotland, by fly-dresser Minnie Morawski for Atlantic salmon anglers around 1945. Tube flies were designed to improve hooking success and to prevent damage to complex and expensive salmon flies by the teeth of hooked salmon. Tube flies have been widely adapted to fly patterns for a variety of cold water and warm water species and are extremely popular for steelhead and salmon in the Pacific Northwest and northeast United States, as well as saltwater species along the Atlantic, Florida and Gulf Coasts. They are widely used in European waters for Atlantic salmon, sea trout and pike.

== History ==
Credit for the invention of the tube fly tying style belongs to fly dresser Minnie Morawski of the Charles Playfair and Company, Aberdeen, Scotland. In 1945 she began experimenting with hollowed out sections of turkey quills as a base for traditional salmon and trout flies rather than traditional hooks. Initial patterns were tied on top of the turkey quill tubes but the tying style quickly evolved into tying patterns "in the round" and on plastic tubes. By the late 1950s, the advantages of the tube fly style were being hailed by Trout and Salmon magazine as the most important innovation in salmon fishing since the introduction of "greased line fishing" techniques in the 1930s.

The tube fly style was quickly adopted in the Pacific Northwest, Northeast U.S. and Florida for salmon, striped bass and tarpon respectively in saltwater environments. For the most part, the tube fly style was being adapted in the U.S. to fly patterns that were trolled rather than cast while fishing. Throughout the late 1940s through early 1970s a variety of small entrepreneurial fly tiers sold commercially tied tube flies along the Pacific, Atlantic and Florida coasts to anglers. As anglers in both Europe and the U.S. gained exposure to the advantages of tube flies, more patterns emerged and more species of game fish were targeted with tube style flies. The use of tube flies for casting to salmon and steelhead in the Puget Sound region was first documented in Fly Fishing for Pacific Salmon (Ferguson, Johnson, Trotter, 1985).

Sometime in the late 1960s and early 1970s, American anglers began introducing the tube fly style to surface poppers, sliders and other floating patterns for both saltwater and freshwater species. In 1987 Bob Popovic, a noted New Jersey–based fly designer and angler introduced the use of high density foam material for saltwater poppers tied tube style. Although traditional hook-based flies remain the dominant style used by fly anglers, tube fly style patterns and materials have been adopted for globally for most species and waters targeted by fly anglers.

== Typical configuration and advantages ==
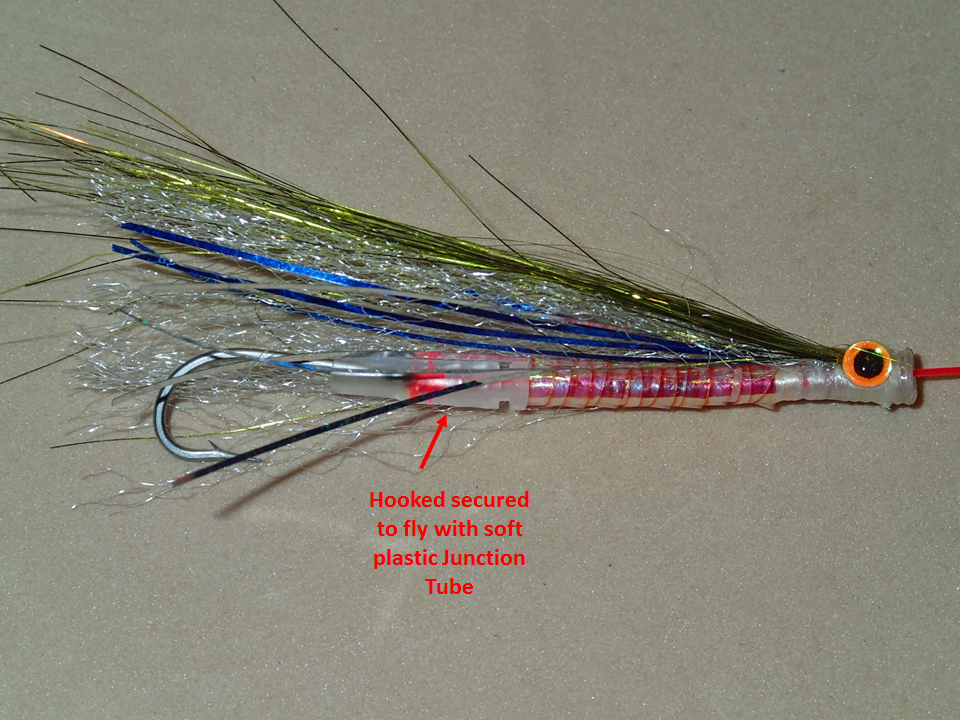
A rigged tube fly showing junction tube and hook

Tube flies are threaded on a tippet instead of the traditional method of tying the fly to the tippet. The angler threads a tippet through the tube and attaches the tippet to a hook. Hooks used for tube flies are typically short shank, wide gap hooks. Once tied to the tippet, the hook is pulled into a junction tube attached to the rear of the tube fly. When a fish is hooked, the fly is typically dislodged from the hook and slides up the tippet. This protects the fly from damage by the fishes teeth. The use of wide gap, short shank hooks with tube flies provides less leverage for fish and results in higher hookup rates over traditional style flies. An additional advantage results from the ability to replace dulled or damaged hooks without replacing the fly. Tube fly hooks can be oriented with hook point down or up depending on conditions.

== Construction ==
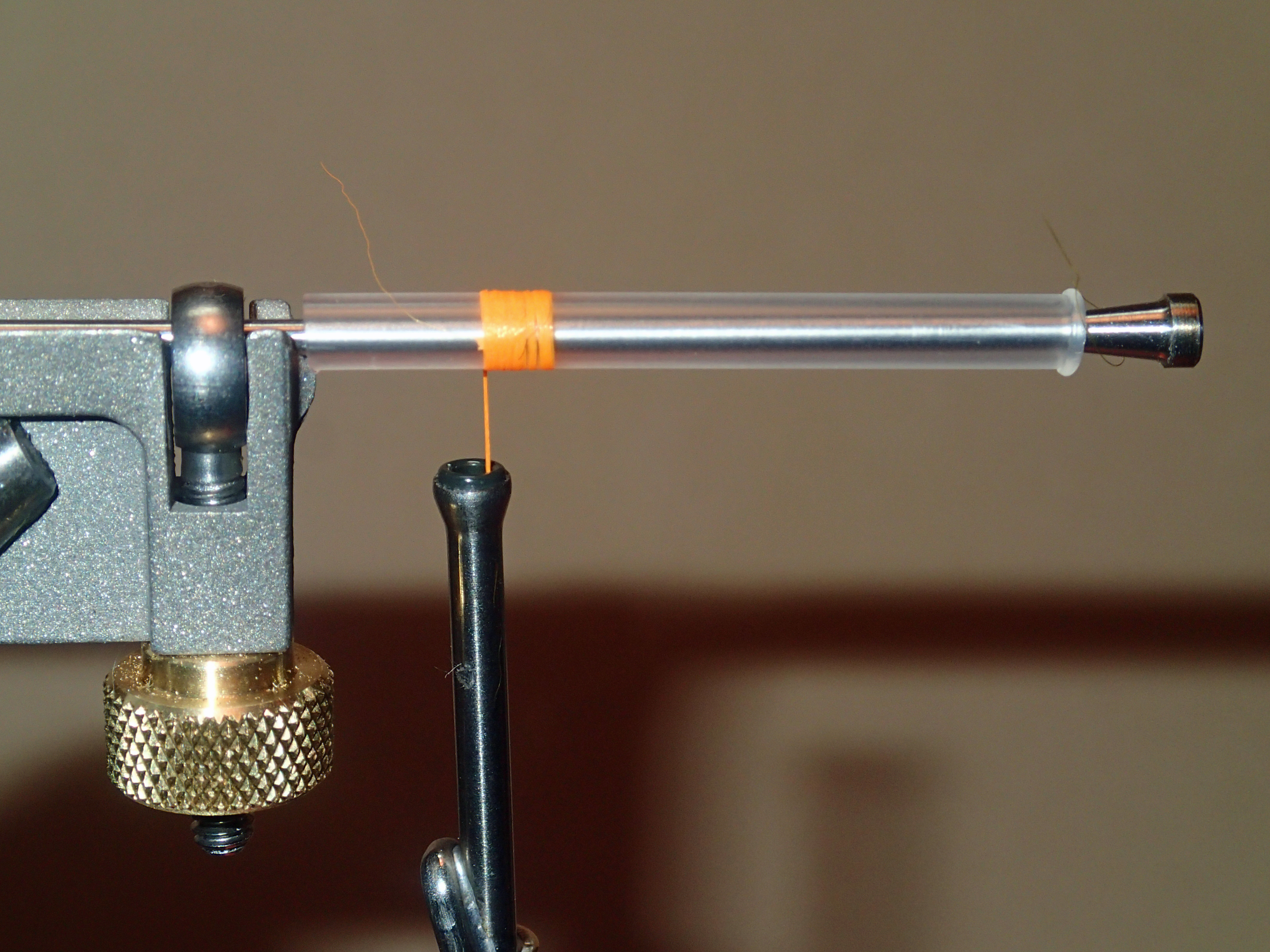
Tube fly vise adapter with tube in place

Tube flies are tied on short sections of brass, copper, aluminum or plastic tubing instead of hooks. Metal tubes are used to add weight to the fly and are usually lined with smaller diameter plastic tubes to protect the tippet. All manner of commercially available tubes and tube fly components are available to the fly tier, many of a specialty nature. Tube fly patterns are tied in the same manner and with the same type of materials used to tie traditional artificial flies. However instead of a hook being clamped in a vise, tube flies are tied using purpose built tube fly vises or adapters. The small diameter tubing is threaded on a tapered needle until secure allowing the addition of materials without the tube slipping or spinning. The ends of plastic tubes are flared with a heat source either before or after the addition of materials to prevent thread from coming off the end of the tube. Plastic or metal cones are sometimes added at the head of the fly to add weight and or create sonic disturbances in the water.

== Typical patterns ==
Tube flies are most popular for salmon, steelhead and large saltwater patterns. However just about any large to medium fly pattern can be tied and fished as a tube fly.
