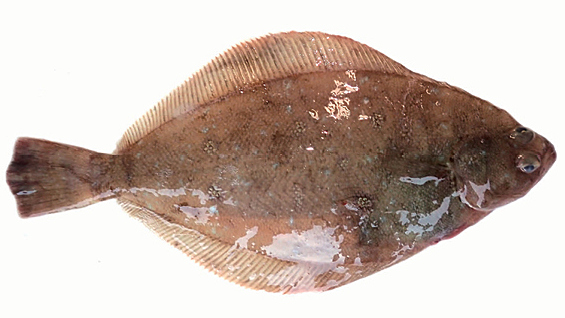

Scientific classification
- Kingdom: Animalia
- Phylum: Chordata
- Class: Actinopterygii
- Order: Carangiformes
- Suborder: Pleuronectoidei
- Family: Pleuronectidae
- Subfamily: Hippoglossinae
- Genus: Eopsetta; Jordan & Goss, 1885

Type species
- Hippoglossoides jordani Lockington, 1879

= Eopsetta =

Genus of fishes

Eopsetta is a genus of righteye flounders native to the northern Pacific Ocean.

== Species ==
There are currently two recognized species in this genus:

- Eopsetta grigorjewi (Herzenstein, 1890) (Shotted halibut)
- Eopsetta jordani (Lockington, 1879) (Petrale sole)
