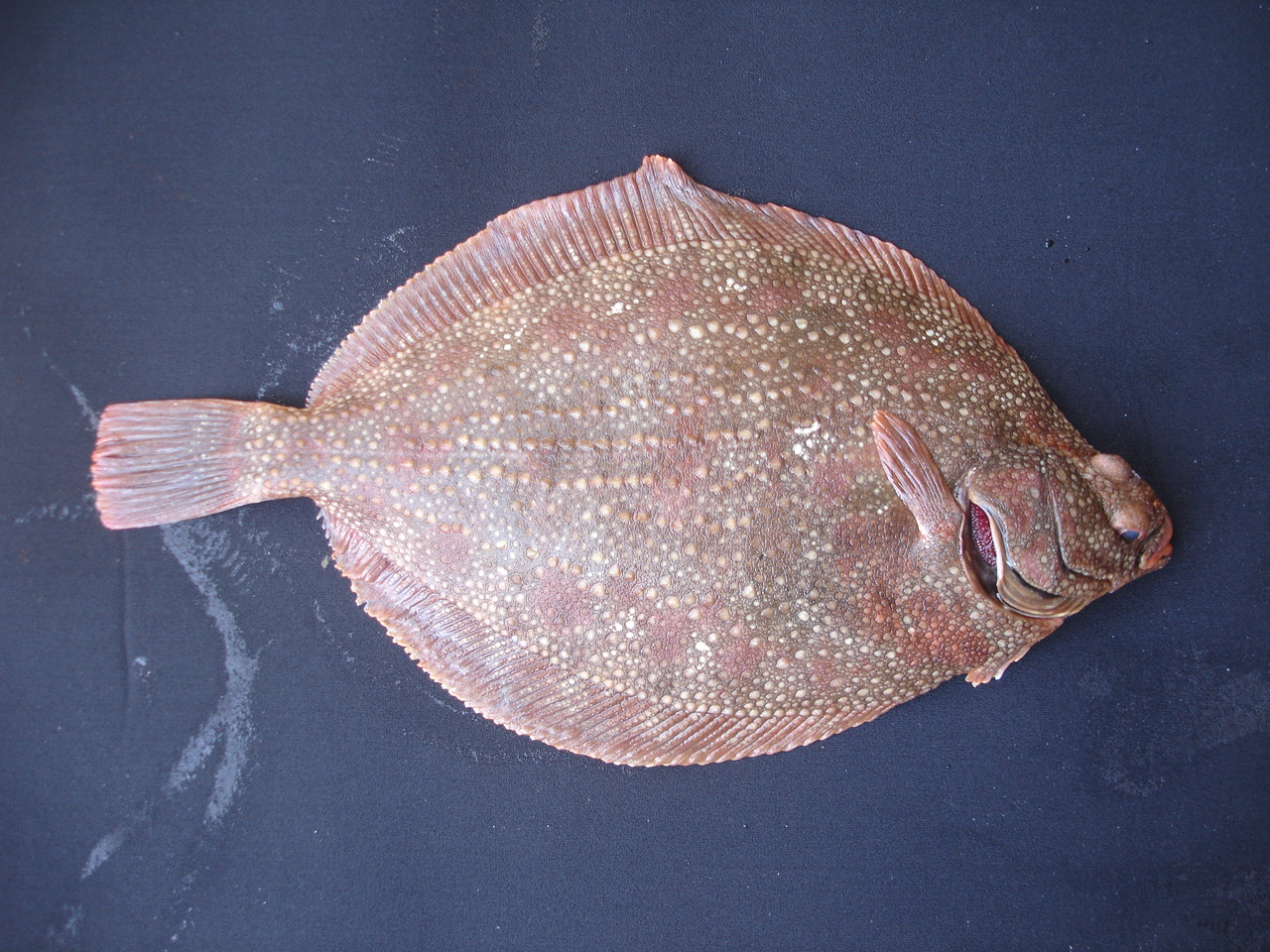

Scientific classification
- Kingdom: Animalia
- Phylum: Chordata
- Class: Actinopterygii
- Division: Teleostei
- Order: Carangiformes
- Suborder: Pleuronectoidei
- Family: Pleuronectidae
- Genus: Clidoderma
- Species: C. asperrimum

Binomial name
- Clidoderma asperrimum (Temminck & Schlegel, 1846)

Synonyms
- Platessa asperrima Temminck & Schlegel, 1846

= Roughscale sole =

Species of fish

The roughscale sole (Clidoderma asperrimum) is an edible flatfish of the family Pleuronectidae. It is a demersal fish that lives on sandy, muddy bottoms at depths from 15 to 1,900 metres (49 to 6,234 ft), though it is most commonly found at depths of between 400 and 600 metres (1,300 and 2,000 ft). It can reach 62 centimetres (24 in) in length and can weigh up to 4.4 kilograms (9.7 lb). Its native habitat is the northern Pacific, from the coasts of China and Japan, across the Bering Sea to Alaska, Canada and the Californian coast of America.

== Diet ==
The roughscale sole's diet consists of zoobenthos organisms such as marine invertebrates and fish.
