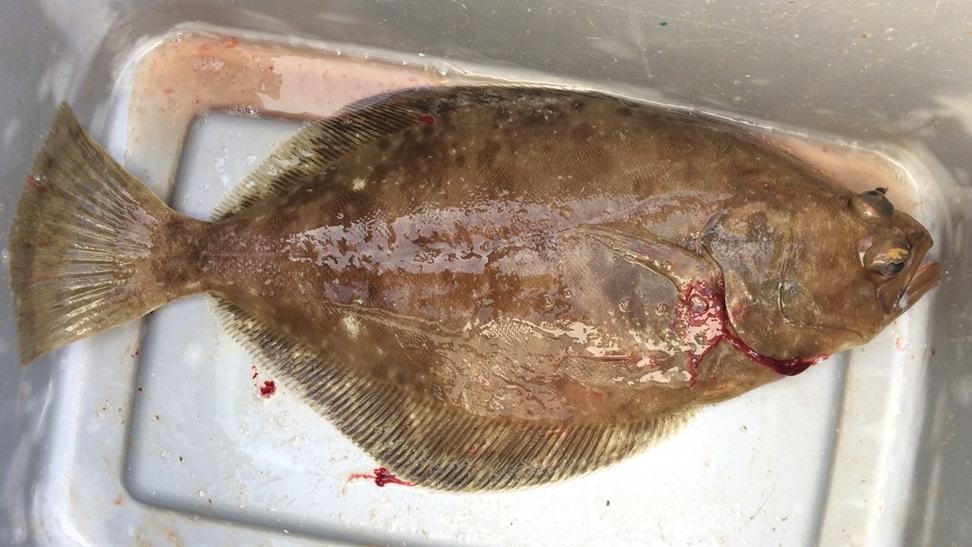

Conservation status
- Least Concern (IUCN 3.1)

Scientific classification
- Kingdom: Animalia
- Phylum: Chordata
- Class: Actinopterygii
- Order: Carangiformes
- Suborder: Pleuronectoidei
- Family: Pleuronectidae
- Genus: Eopsetta
- Species: E. jordani

Binomial name
- Eopsetta jordani (Lockington, 1878)

Synonyms
- Hippoglossoides jordani Lockington, 1879

= Petrale sole =

Species of fish

The Petrale sole (Eopsetta jordani) is an edible flatfish of the family Pleuronectidae. It is a demersal fish that lives on sandy bottoms, usually in deep water, down to depths of about 550 metres (1,800 ft). Males can grow to 53 centimetres (21 in) in length, females to 70 centimetres (28 in), and they can weigh up to 3.7 kilograms (8.2 lb). Its native habitat is the Eastern Pacific, stretching from the coast of Baja California in the south to the Aleutian Islands in the Bering Sea in the north.

Petrale sole is an important commercial fish, caught all along the West Coast of the United States and Canada and into the Bering Sea, almost exclusively by trawler.

== Identification ==
Petrale sole is a right-eyed flounder with an oval body. Its upper surface is uniformly light to dark brown, and its lower surface is white, sometimes with pink traces. It has a large mouth with two rows of small, arrow-shaped teeth on the upper jaw and one row of teeth on the lower jaw.

== Diet ==
Juvenile petrale sole feed on cumaceans, carideans and amphipods, whilst adults will eat shrimps, crabs, epibenthos organisms and other fish, such as herring, hake, anchovy, pollock and other flatfish.

== Commercial fishing ==
The Petrale sole is an important commercial fish, and has been fished off Oregon since at least 1884. One fishery exists, off the west coast of the United States. Although Petrale sole are native to Alaska and are caught there and in other fisheries, no other designated Petrale sole fishery exists.

Between 1995 and 2004 the coastwide catch of Petrale sole ranged from 1,616 to 2,377 tonnes. The Pacific Fishery Management Council has established Acceptable Biological Catch limits for the annual harvests of petrale sole in the waters off the US west coast; from 1995 to 2000 the coastwide total annual catch did not exceed the catch limit, but from 2001 the catch in the Northern assessment area has exceeded the portion of the catch limit attributed to that area.

The estimated biomass of petrale sole in the northern segment of the fishery reached a historical low of 1,267 tonnes in 1992, but has increased steadily since then to 4,960 tonnes in 2005. The southern segment reached a historical low of 1,012 tonnes in 1986, and, after remaining stable for ten years, by 2005 it had increased to 4,667 tonnes. Petrale sole was declared overfished in 2009 and then rebuilt in 2015 after a period of reduced catches.

== Nutrition ==
Nutrition information for Petrale sole is as follows.

Serving Size	100g
=== Calories ===	73 kcal
=== Protein ===	16.4 g
Protein calories: 69 kcal Protein calories % : 95.3%	
=== Fat ===	0.4 g
Fat calories: 3 kcal Fat calories % : 4.7%	
=== Carbohydrate ===	0.0 g
Carbohydrate calories: 0 kcal Carbohydrate calories % : 0.0%	
Cholesterol	63.9 mg
Sodium	58.0 mg

Serving Size	per 100g	per 100 kcal
Omega 3 (EPA+DHA)	138 mg	190 mg
Vitamin B3	2.8 mg	3.9 mg
Vitamin B6	0.2 mg	0.3 mg
Vitamin B12	2.5 mcg	3.4 mcg
Vitamin D	140 IU	193 IU
Vitamin E	0 mg	0 mg
Calcium	6.8 mg	9.4 mg
Magnesium	21.8 mg	30.0 mg
Phosphorus	211 mg	291 mg
Potassium	403 mg	555 mg
Selenium	40 mcg	55 mcg
