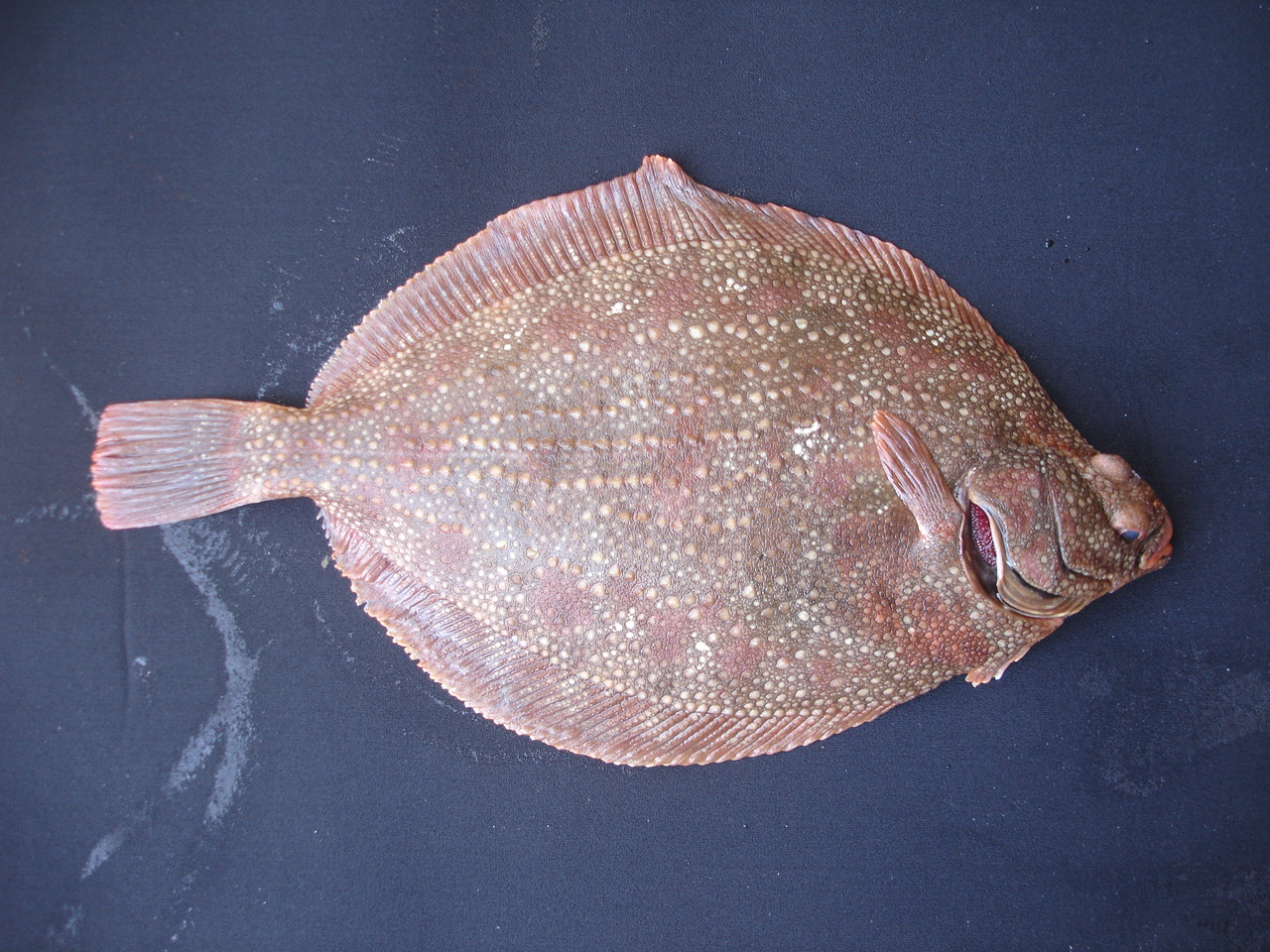

Scientific classification
- Kingdom: Animalia
- Phylum: Chordata
- Class: Actinopterygii
- Order: Carangiformes
- Suborder: Pleuronectoidei
- Family: Pleuronectidae
- Subfamily: Hippoglossinae
- Genus: Clidoderma; Bleeker, 1862

Type species
- Clidoderma asperrimum Temminck & Schlegel, 1846

= Clidoderma =

Clidoderma Temporal range: Middle Miocene–present

Genus of fishes

Clidoderma is a genus of righteye flounders containing one extant species and two described fossil species from Japan.

== Fossil species ==
Two fossil species are known from the Middle Miocene of Japan. C. chitaensis Ohe & Kawase 1995 is known from the Yamami formation of the Chita Peninsula and C. yamagataensis Sakamoto, Uyeno & Otsu 2001 known from Yamagata Prefecture. An indeterminate fossil species is also known from the Middle Miocene of Sakhalin, Russia.

== Extant species ==
There is currently one recognized extant species in this genus:

- Clidoderma asperrimum (Temminck & Schlegel, 1846) (Roughscale sole)

== See also ==
- Prehistoric fish
- List of prehistoric bony fish
