= Slender sole =

Conservation status
- Least Concern (IUCN 3.1)

Scientific classification
- Kingdom: Animalia
- Phylum: Chordata
- Class: Actinopterygii
- Order: Carangiformes
- Suborder: Pleuronectoidei
- Family: Pleuronectidae
- Subfamily: Hippoglossinae
- Genus: Lyopsetta; Jordan & Goss, 1885
- Species: L. exilis

Binomial name
- Lyopsetta exilis (Jordan & Gilbert, 1880)
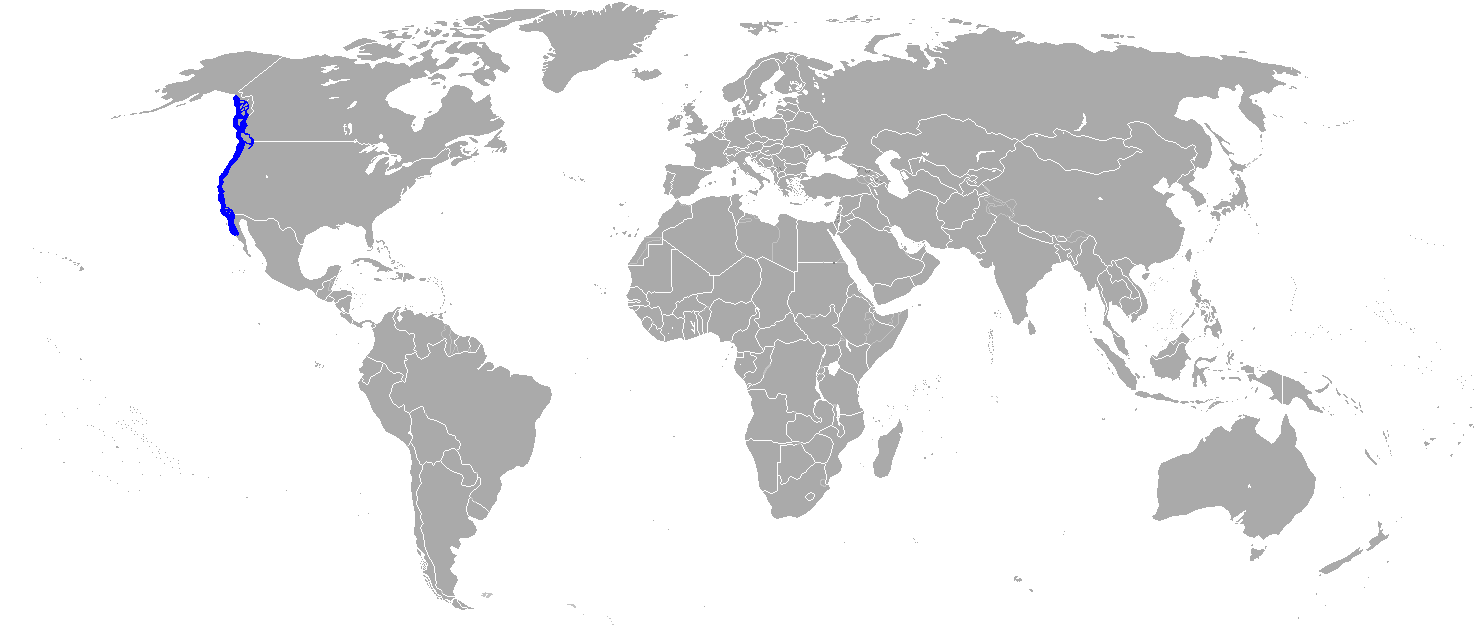
- Distribution of the slender sole

Species of fish

The slender sole (Lyopsetta exilis) is a species of flatfish in the family Pleuronectidae. It is a demersal fish that lives on bottoms near rocky areas at depths of between 25 and 800 metres (82 and 2,625 ft). Its native habitat is the eastern Pacific coast, from the mouth of the Alsek River in Alaska in the north to Isla Cedros in Baja California, Mexico in the south. It can reach up to 35 centimetres (14 in) in length.

== Diet ==
The slender sole's diet consists of zoobenthos crustaceans such as krill, mysids, amphipods and shrimps, as well as marine worms and some fish.

== Commercial fishing ==
The slender sole is harvested by the commercial fishing industry, and is considered to be a good food fish, but it is not landed in significant quantities due to its small size.
