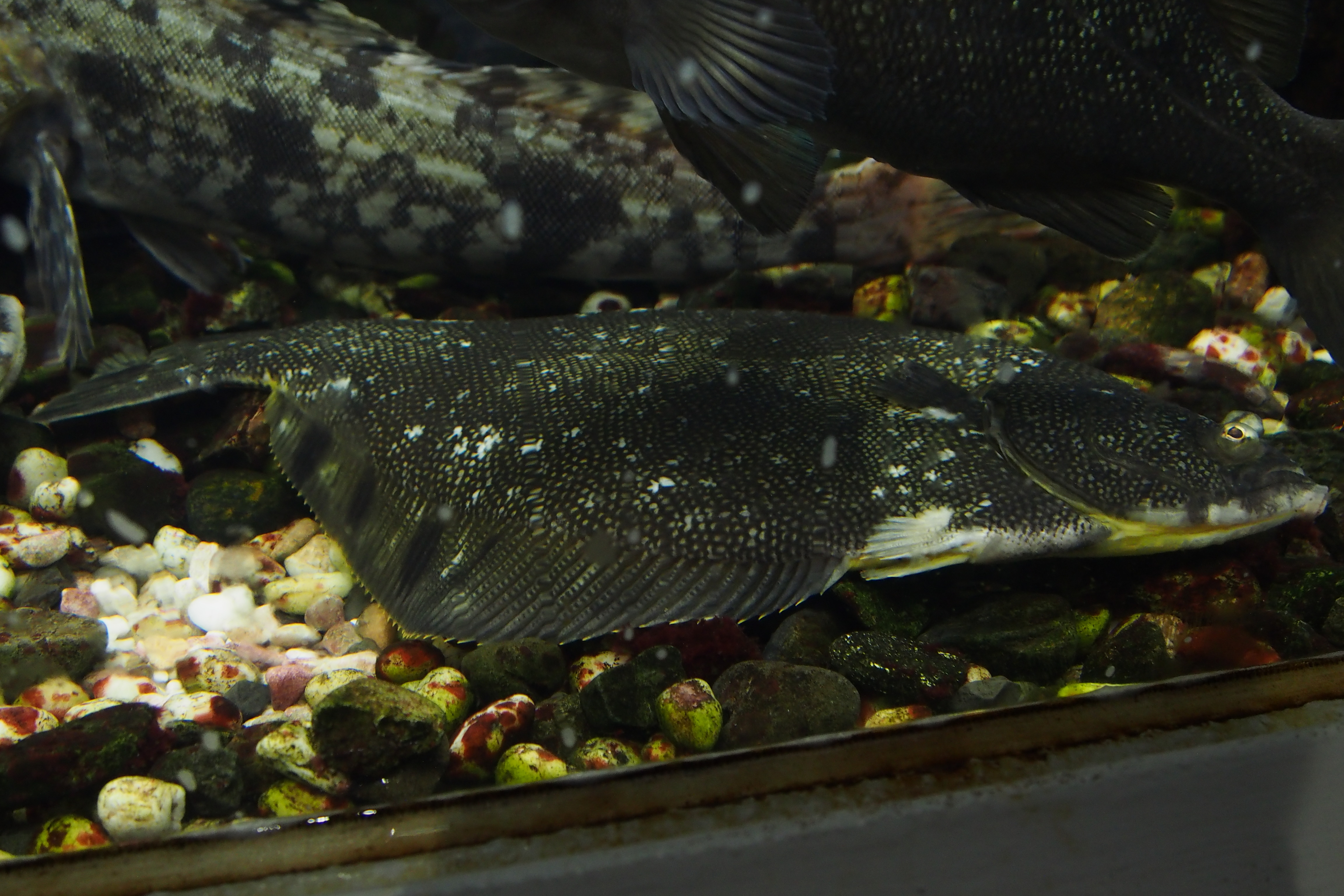

Scientific classification
- Kingdom: Animalia
- Phylum: Chordata
- Class: Actinopterygii
- Order: Carangiformes
- Suborder: Pleuronectoidei
- Family: Pleuronectidae
- Subfamily: Hippoglossinae; Gill, 1864

= Hippoglossinae =

Hippoglossinae Temporal range: Middle Miocene–present

Subfamily of fishes

The Hippoglossinae are a subfamily of fish in the family Pleuronectidae. The name is derived from the Ancient Greek words hippos, "horse", and glossa, "tongue".

== Genera ==
- Clidoderma
- Eopsetta
- Hippoglossus
- Lyopsetta
- Reinhardtius
- Verasper

The fossil genus †Psettoraptor Nazarkin, 2002 is known from the Middle Miocene of Sakhalin, Russia.
