= Fish hook =

Device for catching fish

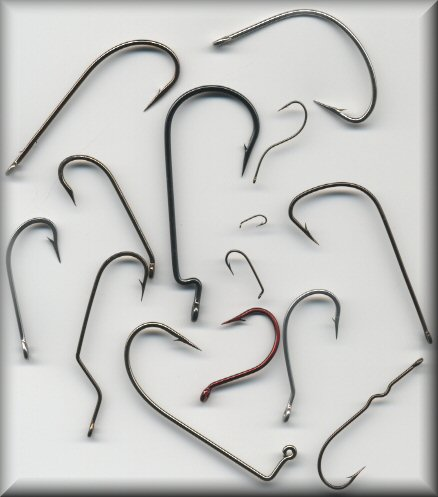
A variety of fish hooks

A fish hook or fishhook, formerly also called an angle (from Old English angol and Proto-Germanic *angulaz), is a hook used to catch fish either by piercing and embedding onto the inside of the fish mouth (angling) or, more rarely, by impaling and snagging the external fish body. Fish hooks are normally attached to a line, which tethers the target fish to the angler for retrieval, and are typically dressed with some form of bait or lure that entices the fish to swallow the hook out of its own natural instinct to forage or hunt.

Fish hooks have been employed for millennia by fishermen to catch freshwater and saltwater fish. There is an enormous variety of fish hooks in the world of fishing. Sizes, designs, shapes, and materials are all variable depending on the intended purpose of the hook. Fish hooks are manufactured for a range of purposes from general fishing to extremely limited and specialized applications. Fish hooks are designed to hold various types of artificial, processed, dead or live baits (bait fishing); to act as the foundation for artificial representations of invertebrate prey (e.g. fly fishing); or to be attached to or integrated into other devices that mimic prey (lure fishing). In 2005, the fish hook was chosen by Forbes as one of the Top 20 tools in human history.

== History ==
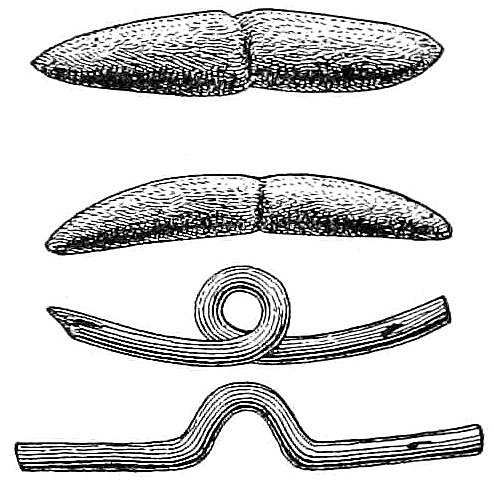
Primeval stone and bronze gorges

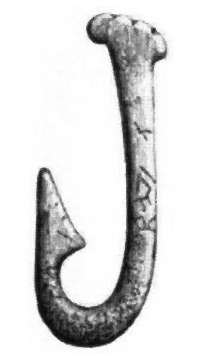
Stone Age fish hook made from bone

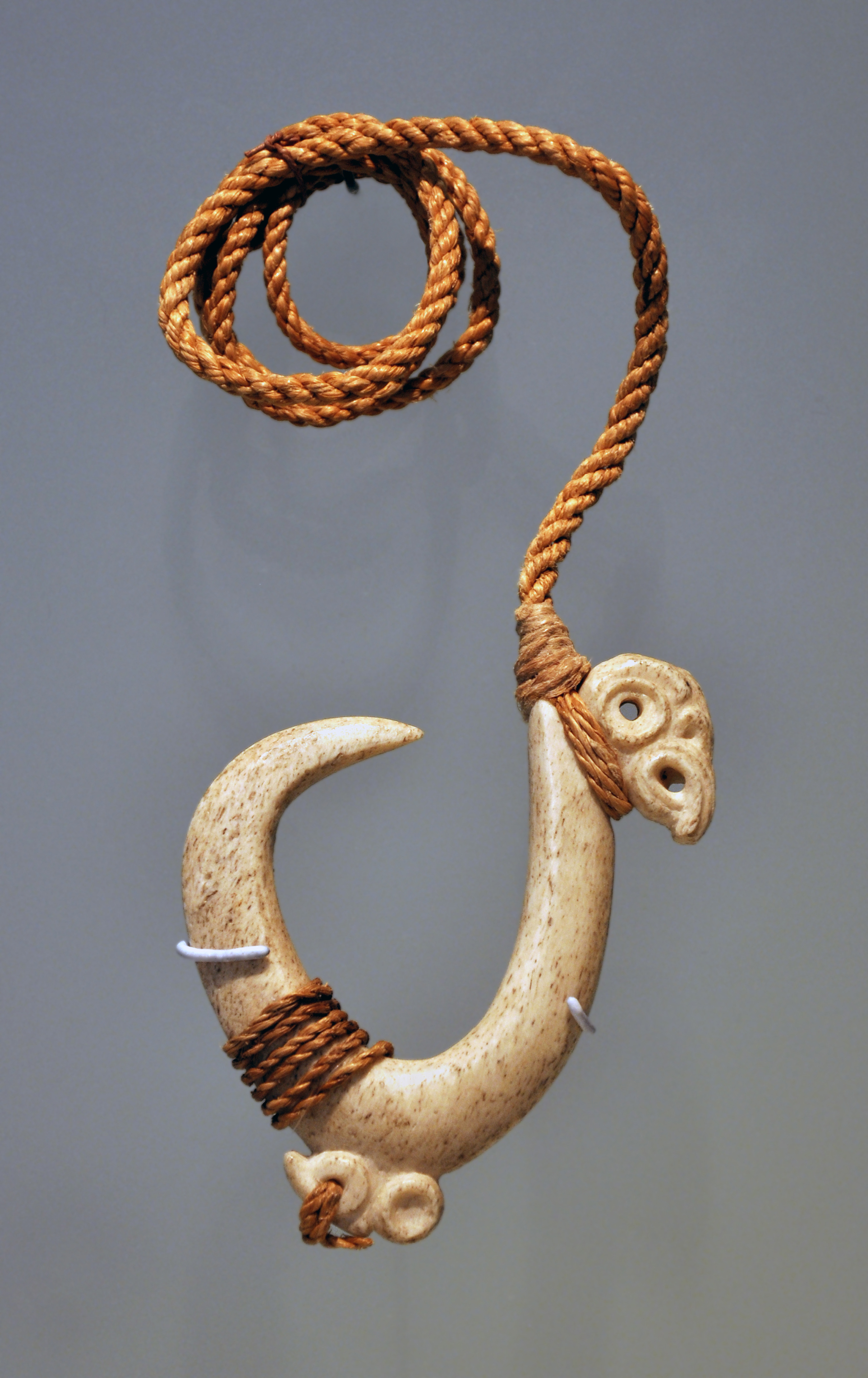
Traditional bone fishing hook of the New Zealand Māori

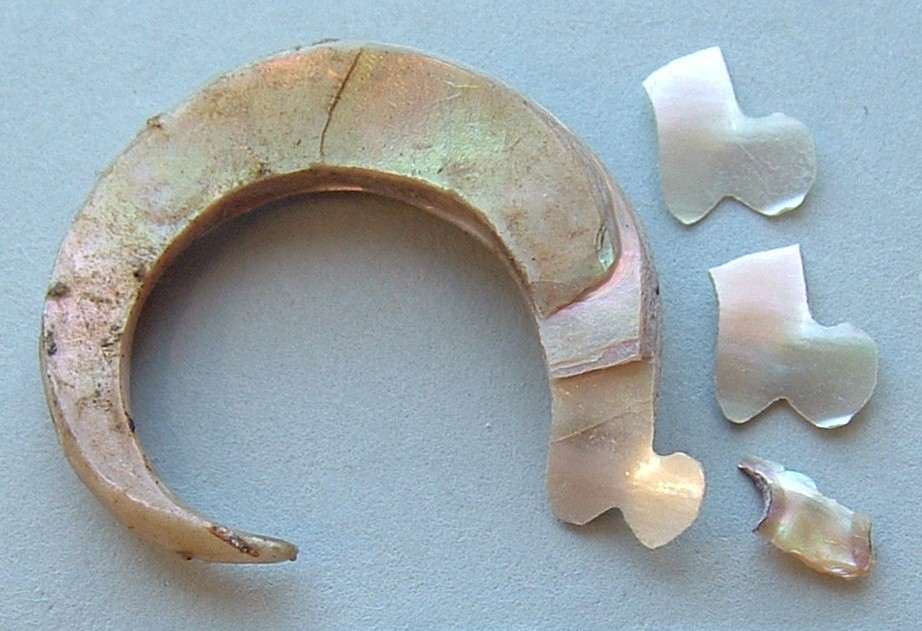
Native American shell fish hook from California. Auckland Museum

The fish hook or similar angling device has been made by humans for many thousands of years. The earliest prehistoric tackle is known as a gorge, which consisted of a double-pointed stick with a thin rope tied to the middle. When angling, the gorge is laid parallel to the line and buried inside a bait ball, which can be swallowed easily by the fish. Once inside the fish's mouth, the bait ball often softens and gets fragmented by the pharyngeal teeth, and any pulling along the line will cause the freed-up gorge to rotate transversely and get stuck across the fish's gullet, similar to how a fish bone or chicken bone may pierce and obstruct a human's esophagus. They performed similar anchoring functions to hooks, but needed both ends to claw firmly into the fish's gullet to work properly.

The world's oldest fish hooks (made from sea snail shells) were discovered in Sakitari Cave in Okinawa Island dated between 22,380 and 22,770 years old. They are older than the fish hooks from the Jerimalai cave in East Timor dated between 23,000 and 16,000 years old, and New Ireland in Papua New Guinea dated 20,000 to 18,000 years old.

The earliest fish hooks in the Americas, dating from about 11,000 B.P., have been reported from Cedros Island on the west coast of Mexico. These fish hooks were made from sea shells. Shells provided a common material for fish hooks found in several parts of the world, with the shapes of prehistoric shell fish hook specimens occasionally being compared to determine if they provide information about the migration of people into the Americas.

An early written reference to a fish hook is found with reference to the Leviathan in the Book of Job 41:1; Canst thou draw out leviathan with a hook? Fish hooks have been crafted from all sorts of materials including wood, animal and human bone, horn, shells, stone, bronze, iron, and up to present day materials. In many cases, hooks were created from multiple materials to leverage the strength and positive characteristics of each material. Norwegians as late as the 1950s still used juniper wood to craft Burbot hooks. Quality steel hooks began to make their appearance in Europe in the 17th century and hook making became a task for specialists.

== Sections ==
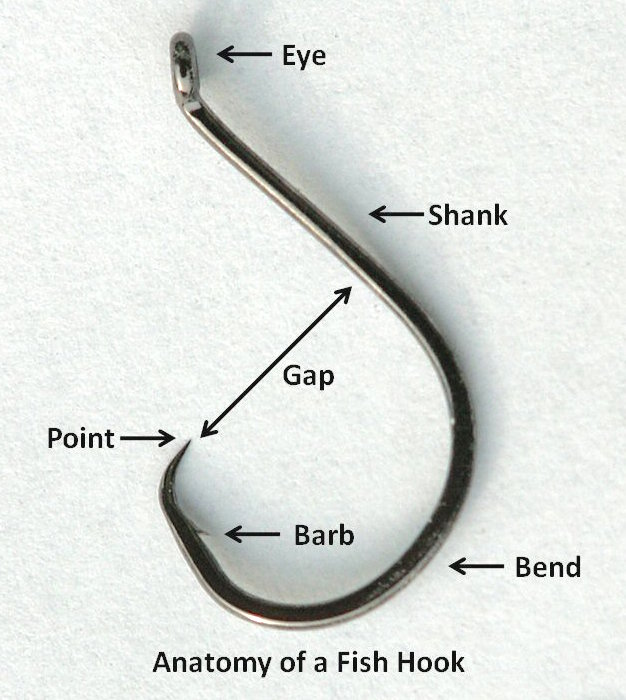
Anatomy of a fish hook

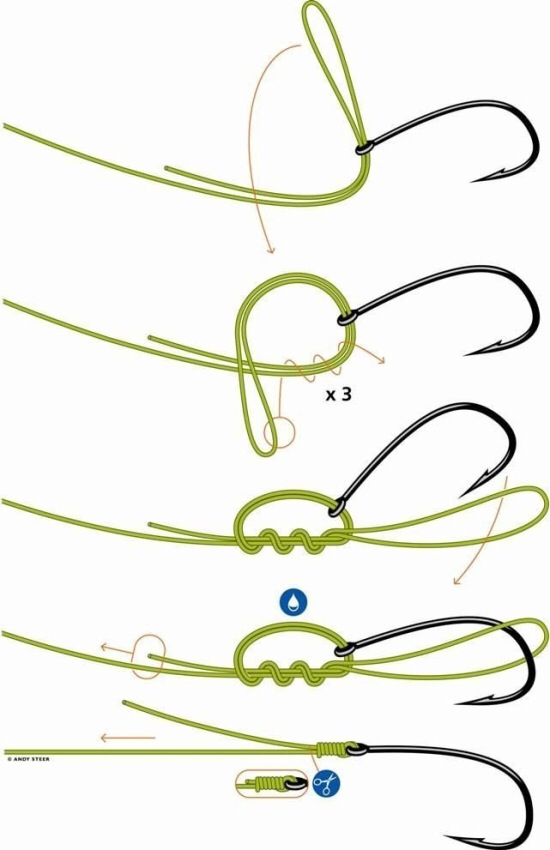
The Palomar knot, a commonly used knot to attach a monofilament line to the hook

The hook can be divided into different portions from the back ends to the front:

- The eye is the circular ring/loop at the back end to which fishing lines can be attached via knots, and (typically) receives the pulling force from the line.
- The shank is the (usually) straight shaft section of the hook, which relays pulling force from the line to the hook bend.
- The bend is the section where the hook curves back from the shank.
- The barb is a small reverse-pointing (relative to the main hook point) spike that grabs the surrounding fish tissue and stops the hook from sliding back out of its anchorage. Hooks that lack barbs are thus barbless.
- The point is the distalmost portion where the hook tapers into a sharp end, which pierces and embeds into the fish's tissue.

The perpendicular distance between the hook point and the frontmost inner arc of the bend is known as the bite of the hook, which indicates the maximum depth the hook can be embedded or set. The width of the opening between the point and the shank is called the gap or mouth of the hook, which dictates the thickness of the tissue that the hook can catch.

== Hook types ==
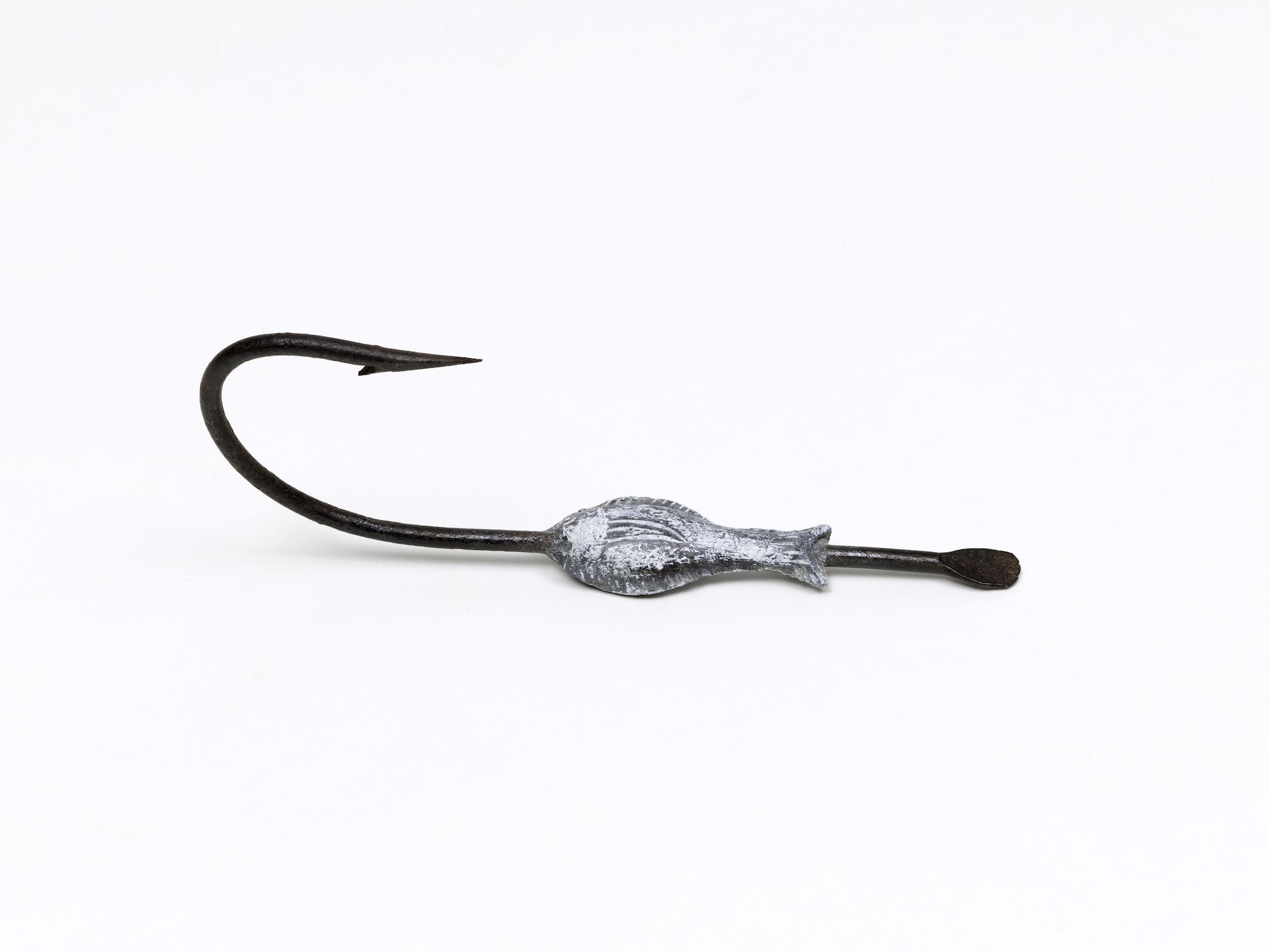
Iron fish hook, decorated with a small fish in lead, used for the cod fishery around Iceland, NAVIGO National Fisheries Museum, Belgium

There are a large number of different types of fish hooks. At the macro level, there are bait hooks, fly hooks and lure hooks. Within these broad categories there are wide varieties of hook types designed for different applications. Hook types differ in shape, materials, points and barbs, and eye type, and ultimately in their intended application. When individual hook types are designed the specific characteristics of each of these hook components are optimized relative to the hook's intended purpose. For example, a delicate dry fly hook is made of thin wire with a tapered eye because weight is the overriding factor. Whereas Carlisle or Aberdeen light wire bait hooks make use of thin wire to reduce injury to live bait but the eyes are not tapered because weight is not an issue. Many factors contribute to hook design, including corrosion resistance, weight, strength, hooking efficiency, and whether the hook is being used for specific types of bait, on different types of lures or for different styles of flies. For each hook type, there are ranges of acceptable sizes. For all types of hooks, sizes range from 32 (the smallest) to 20/0 (the largest).

=== Shapes and names ===
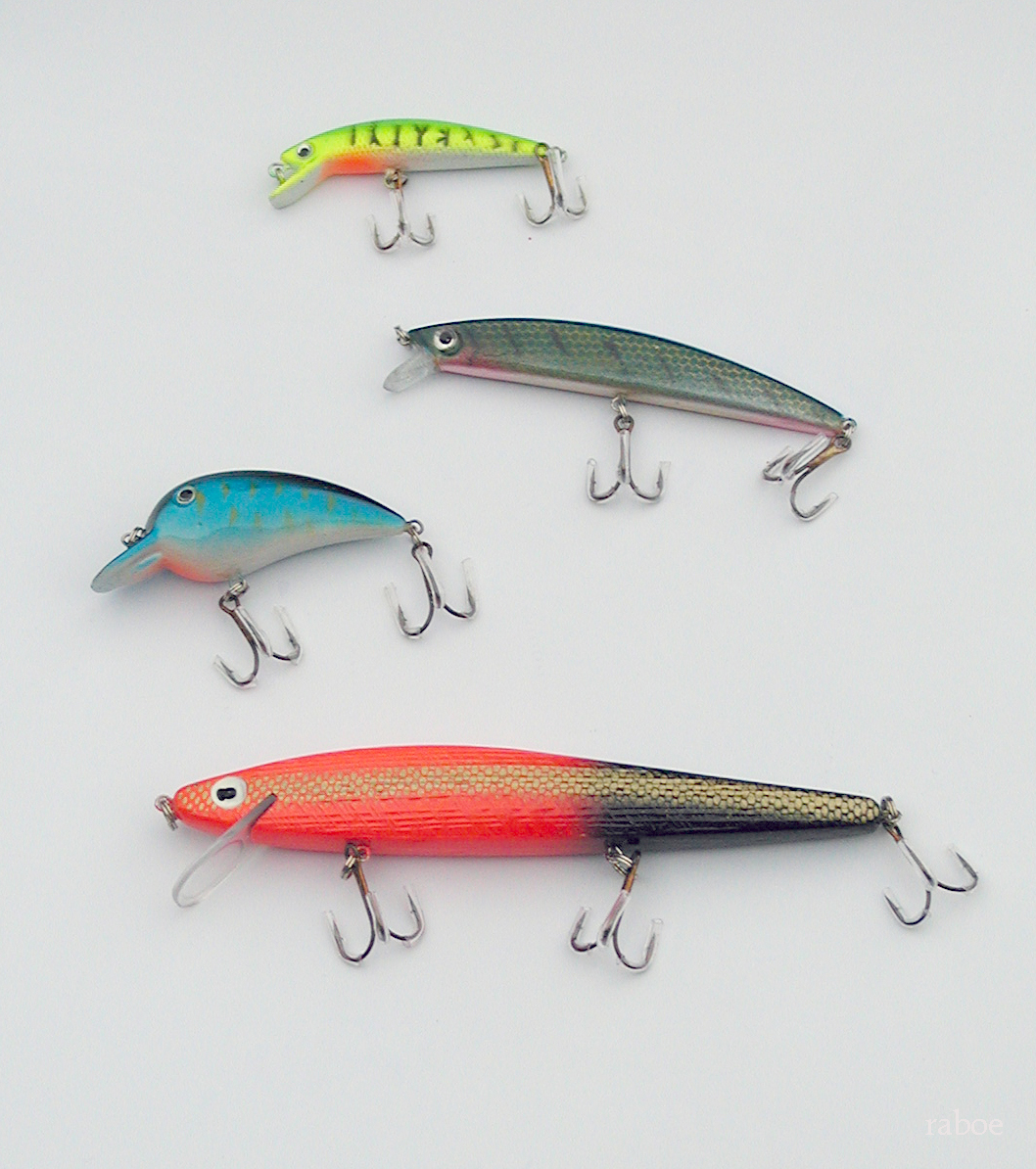
Treble hooks attached to artificial lures

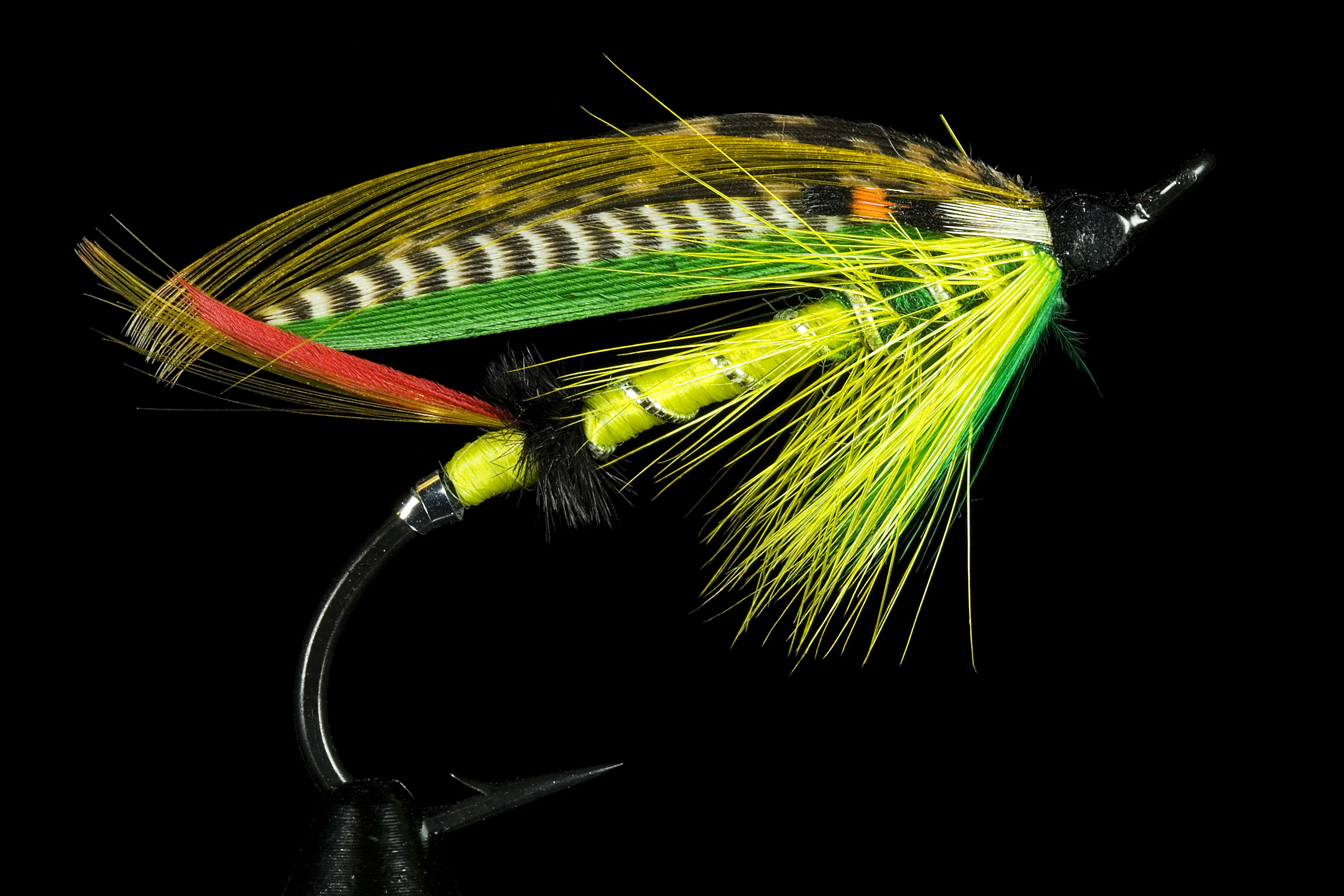
A Salmon Fly hook as the foundation for a Green Highlander, a classic salmon fly

Hook shapes and names are as varied as fish themselves. In some cases, hooks are identified by a traditional or historic name, e.g. Aberdeen, Limerick or O'Shaughnessy. In other cases, hooks are merely identified by their general purpose or have included in their name, one or more of their physical characteristics. Some manufacturers just give their hooks model numbers and describe their general purpose and characteristics. For example:

- Eagle Claw: 139 is a Snelled Baitholder, Offset, Down Eye, Two Slices, Medium Wire
- Lazer Sharp: L2004EL is a Circle Sea, Wide Gap, Non-Offset, Ringed Eye, Light Wire
- Mustad Model: 92155 is a Beak Baitholder hook
- Mustad Model: 91715D is an O'Shaughnessy Jig Hook, 90-degree angle
- TMC Model 300: Streamer D/E, 6XL, Heavy wire, Forged, Bronze
- TMC Model 200R: Nymph & Dry Fly Straight eye, 3XL, Standard wire, Semi-dropped point, Forged, Bronze

The shape of the hook shank can vary widely from merely straight to all sorts of curves, kinks, bends and offsets. These different shapes contribute in some cases to better hook penetration, fly imitations or bait holding ability. Many hooks intended to hold dead or artificial baits have sliced shanks which create barbs for better baiting holding ability. Jig hooks are designed to have lead weight molded onto the hook shank. Hook descriptions may also include shank length as standard, extra-long, 2XL, short, etc. and wire size such as fine wire, extra heavy, 2X heavy, etc.

==== Single, double and triple hooks ====
Hooks are designed as either single hooks—a single eye, shank and point; double hooks—a single eye merged with two shanks and points; or triple—a single eye merged with three shanks and three evenly spaced points. Double hooks are formed from a single piece of wire and may or may not have their shanks brazed together for strength. Treble hooks are formed by adding a single eyeless hook to a double hook and brazing all three shanks together. Double hooks are used on some artificial lures and are a traditional fly hook for Atlantic Salmon flies, but are otherwise fairly uncommon. Treble hooks are used on all sorts of artificial lures as well as for a wide variety of bait applications.

==== Bait hook shapes and names ====
Bait hook shapes and names include the Salmon Egg, Beak, O'Shaughnessy, Baitholder, Shark Hook, Aberdeen, Carlisle, Carp Hook, Tuna Circle, Offset Worm, Circle Hook, suicide hook, Long Shank, Short Shank, J Hook, Octopus Hook and Big Game Jobu hooks.

==== Fly hook shapes and names ====
Fly hook shapes include Sproat, Sneck, Limerick, Kendal, Viking, Captain Hamilton, Barleet, Swimming Nymph, Bend Back, Model Perfect, Keel, and Kink-shank.

=== Points and barbs ===
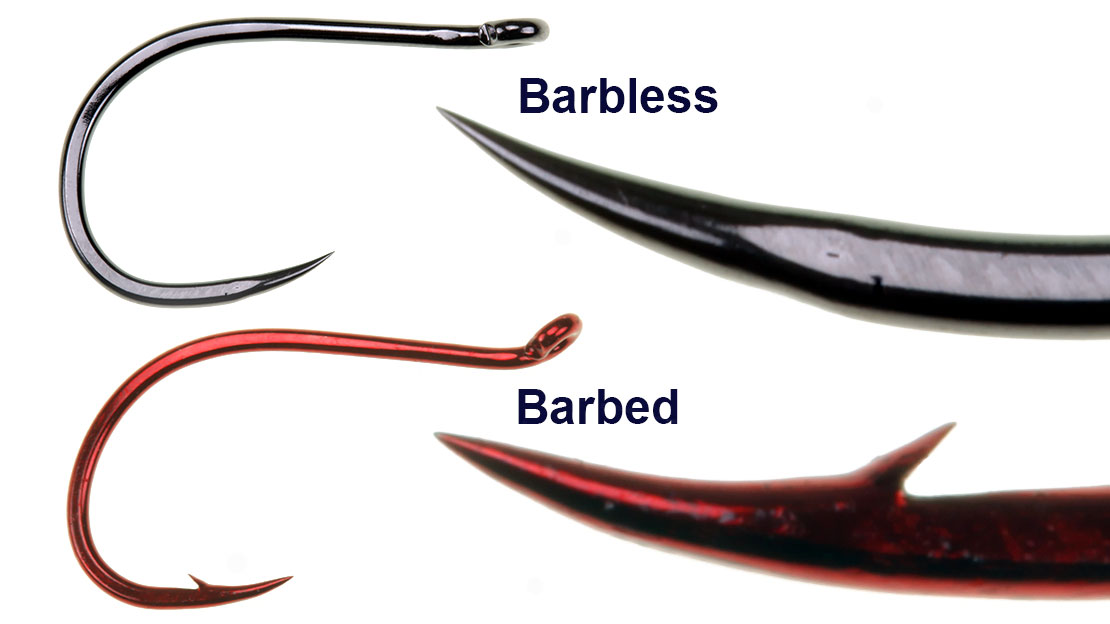
Barbless hook (top) vs. barbed hook (bottom)

The hook point is probably the most important part of the hook, because it is the point that must penetrate into the fish's flesh first if the hook is to have any anchorage whatsoever. Both the profile of the hook point and its angulation influence how well the point will pierce the tissue. Hook points are mechanically (ground) or chemically sharpened.

Most modern hooks are barbed, with a backward-protruding spike (i.e. barb) that helps secure the hook anchorge by catching surrounding flesh to stop the point from sliding back out of the penetration. Because the barb increases the practical cross-sectional area of the hook point, it also negatively affects how far the point penetrates under the same force (especially when piercing harder tissue), although the tissue-grabbing ability of the barb alone is usually sufficient for maintaining the hook anchorage without needing a deep penetration.

Some hooks are barbless, with a simply tapered point and lacking any barb. Historically, ancient fish hooks were all barbless, but today barbless hooks are still used mainly to facilitate quicker hook removal and make catch-and-release less hurtful for the fish. The downside of barbless hooks is that because there is no barb to help secure the point anchorage, the hook is theoretically more susceptible to dislodging unless the penetration is maintained with a constantly taut line tension. There are however also some arguments that a barbless hook point will penetrate more smoothly into the fish tissue and thus allow a deeper hookset, compensating for the absence of barbs. Having a deeper hookset also means the stress tends to be concentrated nearer towards the hook's bend rather than the point, allowing it to better withstand a heavier pulling load.

==== Hook point types ====
Hook points are also described relative to their offset from the hook shank. A kerbed hook point is offset to the left, a straight point has no offset and a reversed point is offset to the right.

Hook points are commonly referred to by these names: needle point, rolled-in, hollow, spear, beak, mini-barb, semi-dropped and knife edge. Some other hook point names are used for branding by manufacturers.

=== Eyes ===
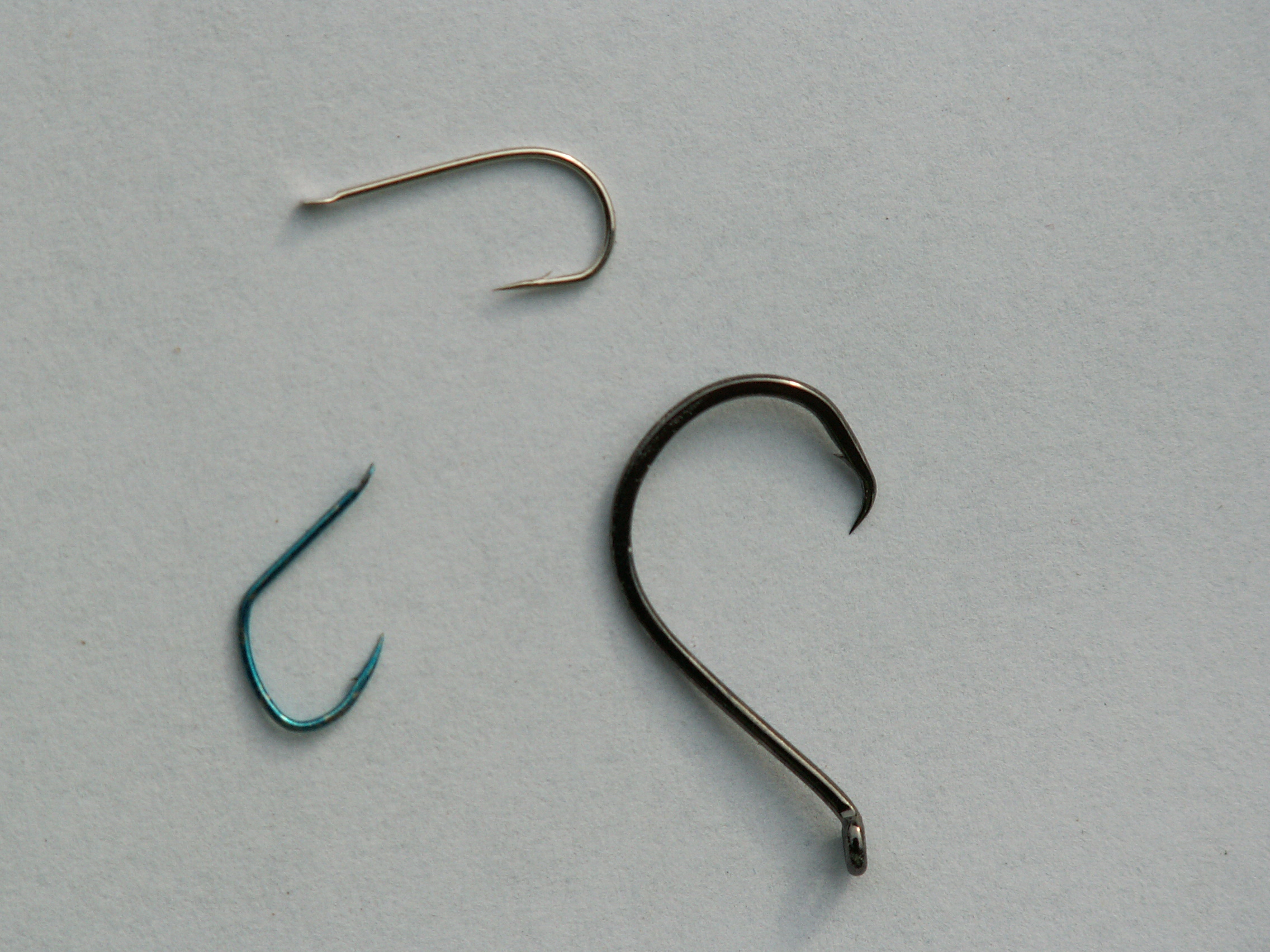
(Clockwise from top) A standard J-hook with straight eye, a circle hook with down-turned (outward angled) eye, and an eyeless Japanese Tenkara hook with a spade end.

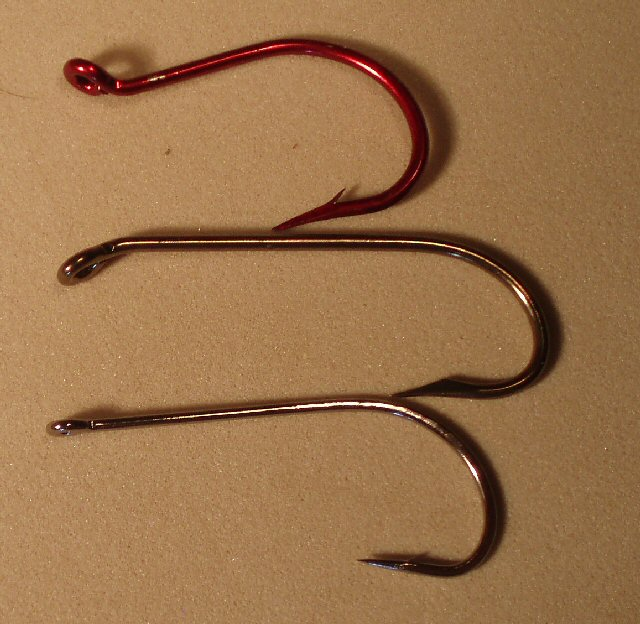
Up-turned, down-turned and straight hook eyes

The eye of the hook is the widened ring/loop at its proximal end, with a hole where the fishing line (typically the leader line) is passed through (threaded) for fastening via knot-tying. Hook eye design is usually optimized for either strength, weight and/or presentation. Typical eye types include:

- Ringed eye or ball eye — a circular loop often with a closely opposed gap between the loop end and the loop base;
- Brazed eye — like a ringed eye, but the loop end is welded shut fully without any gap;
- Tapered eye — like a ringed eye, but with a pointed loop end;
- Looped eye — the loop end is elongated with the extended portion laid parallel to the hook shank;
- Needle eye — the eye hole is ellipsical, or just a narrow slit.

Most hook eyes are directly knotted to the fishing line and are responsible for relaying the pulling force from the line onto the hook body, but sometimes the line is passed cleanly through the eye and tied directly onto the shank instead of onto the eye loop — this is known as a snell knot or "snelling", and the eye does not take part in transferring any force, merely serving to restrict line wobbling and knot sliding. In fishing lures, it is also not uncommon to see the hook being linked to the lure via a split ring through the eye, which allows the hook more range of motion.

Hook eyes can also be categorized into three types according to the angulation of the loop plane against the shank, where hooks with bent/"turned" eyes being more optimized for snelling:

- Straight — the eye is in-line with the shank;
- Up-turned — the eye is angled away from the hook point;
- Down-turned — the eye is angled towards the hook point.

Some hooks, such as the traditional Japanese Tenkara hooks, lack any opening for the line to be threaded, and are thus eyeless. Eyeless hooks instead have a widened "spade end" to help snelling the line onto the shank without slipping.

=== Size ===
There are no internationally recognized standards for hooks and thus size is somewhat inconsistent between manufacturers. However, within a manufacturer's range of hooks, hook sizes are consistent.

Hook sizes generally are referred to by a numbering system that places the size 1 hook in the middle of the size range. Smaller hooks are referenced by larger whole numbers (e.g. 1, 2, 3...). Larger hooks are referenced for size increases by increasing whole numbers followed by a "/" and a "0" (i.e. sizes over zero), for example, 1/0 (read as "one nought"), 2/0, 3/0.... The numbers represent relative sizes, normally associated with the gap (the distance from the point tip to the shank). The smallest size available is 32 and largest is 20/0.

== See also ==
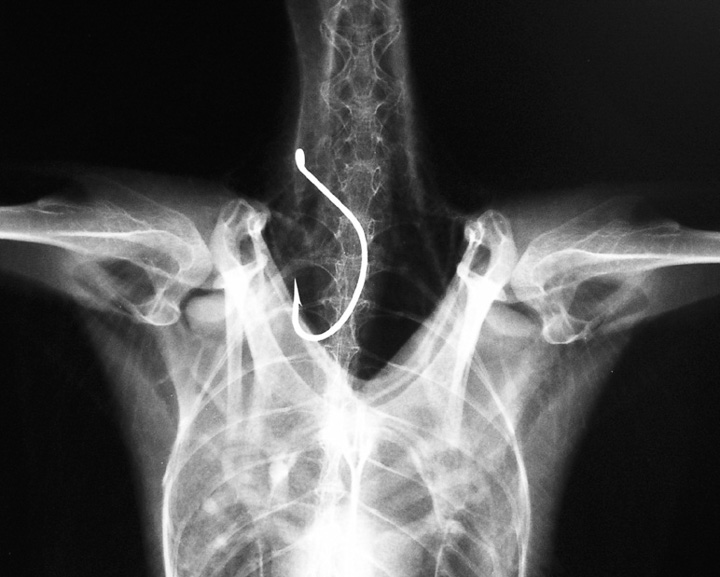
Veterinary X-ray of a fish hook stuck in the crop of an unidentified species of cormorant

- Angling
- Flossing
