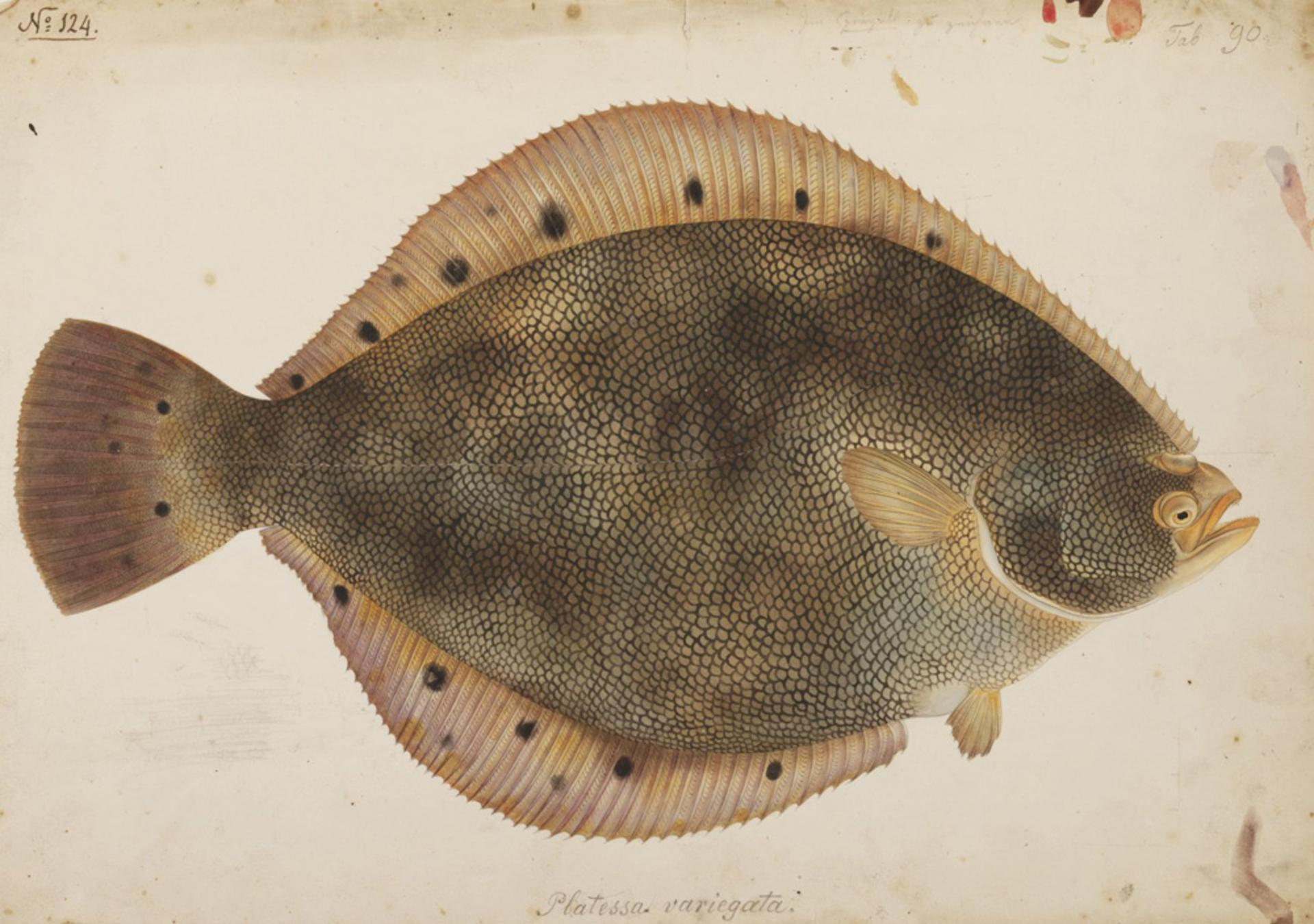
- eyed side view
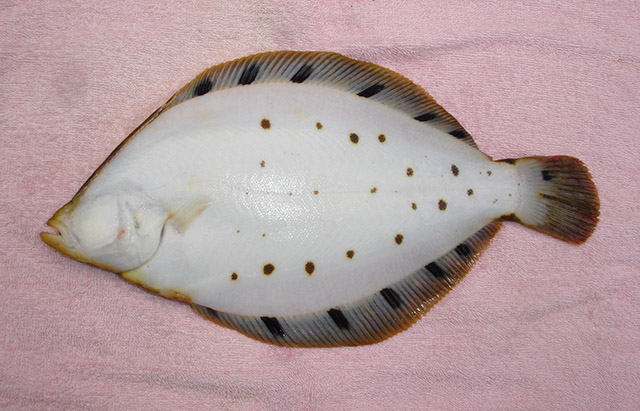
- blind side

Scientific classification
- Kingdom: Animalia
- Phylum: Chordata
- Class: Actinopterygii
- Division: Teleostei
- Order: Carangiformes
- Suborder: Pleuronectoidei
- Family: Pleuronectidae
- Genus: Verasper
- Species: V. variegatus

Binomial name
- Verasper variegatus (Temminck & Schlegel, 1846)

Synonyms
- Platessa variegata Temminck & Schlegel, 1846

= Spotted halibut =

Species of fish

The spotted halibut (Verasper variegatus) is a flatfish of the family Pleuronectidae. It is a demersal fish that lives on sandy, muddy bottoms in the sublittoral coastal zone at depths of up to 100 metres (330 ft). It can reach 60 centimetres (24 in) in length and can weigh up to 4.0 kilograms (8.8 lb). Its native habitat is the northwestern Pacific, from Japan to Korea and the East China Sea.
