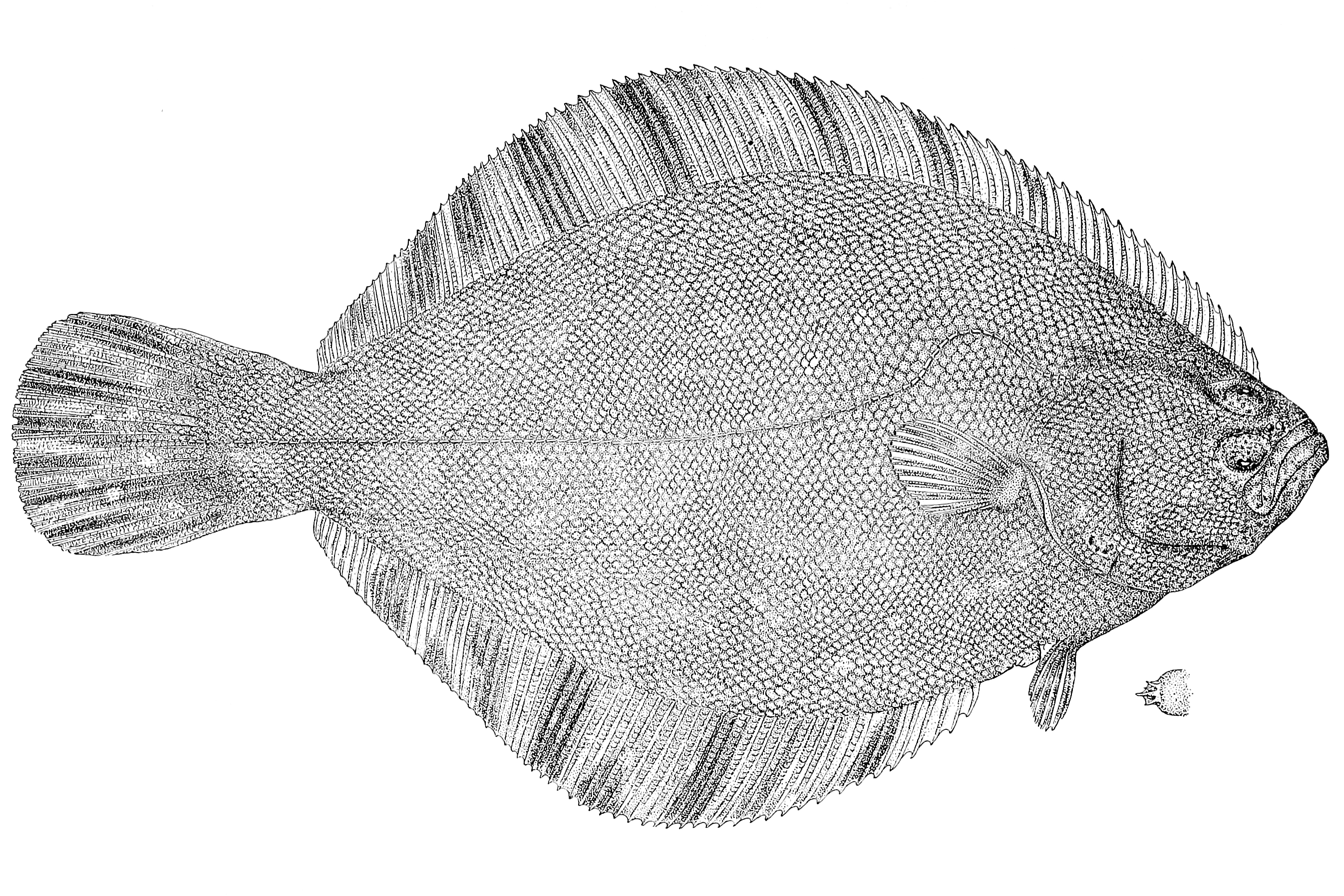

Scientific classification
- Kingdom: Animalia
- Phylum: Chordata
- Class: Actinopterygii
- Division: Teleostei
- Order: Carangiformes
- Suborder: Pleuronectoidei
- Family: Pleuronectidae
- Genus: Verasper
- Species: V. moseri

Binomial name
- Verasper moseri Jordan & Gilbert, 1898

= Barfin flounder =

Species of fish

The barfin flounder (Verasper moseri) is a flatfish of the family Pleuronectidae. It is a demersal fish that lives on sandy, muddy bottoms at depths of up to 900 metres (3,000 ft). It can reach up to 70 centimetres (28 in) in length and can weigh as much as 4.0 kilograms (8.8 lb). Its native habitat is the northwestern Pacific, specifically the Sea of Okhotsk, Japan's northern Pacific coast, the Strait of Tartary and the Kuril Islands.
