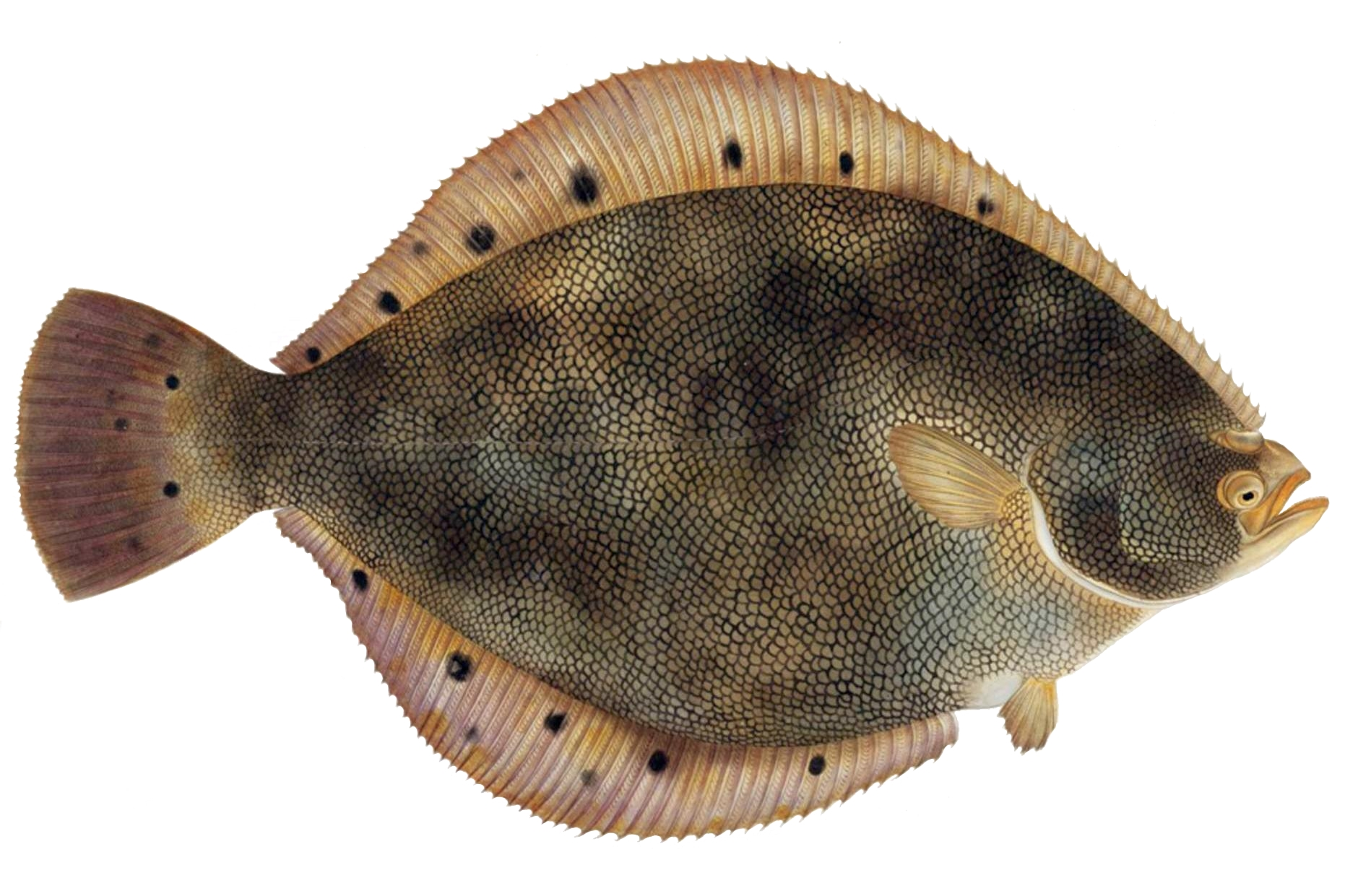
- Verasper variegatus

Scientific classification
- Domain: Eukaryota
- Kingdom: Animalia
- Phylum: Chordata
- Class: Actinopterygii
- Order: Carangiformes
- Suborder: Pleuronectoidei
- Family: Pleuronectidae
- Subfamily: Hippoglossinae
- Genus: Verasper; Jordan & Gilbert, 1898

Type species
- Verasper moseri Jordan & Gilbert, 1898

= Verasper =

Genus of fishes

Verasper is a genus of righteye flounders native to the north-western Pacific Ocean.

== Species ==
There are currently two recognized species in this genus:

Image	Scientific name	Distribution
	Verasper moseri Jordan & Gilbert, 1898 (Barfin flounder)	Sea of Okhotsk, Japan's northern Pacific coast, the Strait of Tartary and the Kuril Islands.
	Verasper variegatus (Temminck & Schlegel, 1846) (Spotted halibut)	north-western Pacific, from Japan to Korea and the East China Sea.
