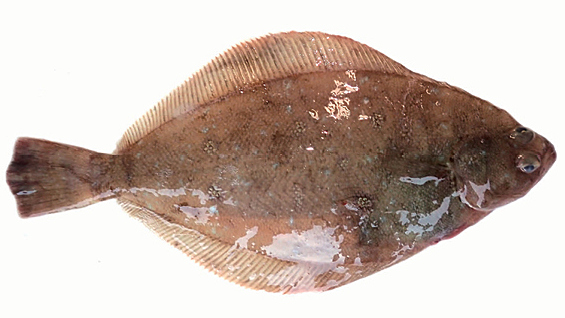

Conservation status
- Vulnerable (IUCN 3.1)

Scientific classification
- Domain: Eukaryota
- Kingdom: Animalia
- Phylum: Chordata
- Class: Actinopterygii
- Order: Carangiformes
- Suborder: Pleuronectoidei
- Family: Pleuronectidae
- Genus: Eopsetta
- Species: E. grigorjewi

Binomial name
- Eopsetta grigorjewi (Herzenstein, 1890)

Synonyms
- Hippoglossus grigorjewi Herzenstein, 1890; Verasper otakii Jordan & Snyder, 1900

= Shotted halibut =

Species of fish

The shotted halibut (Eopsetta grigorjewi) is a flatfish of the family Pleuronectidae. It is a demersal fish that lives on sandy mud bottoms in the sublittoral zone at depths of between 60 metres (200 ft) and 1,325 metres (4,347 ft). It can reach 60 centimetres (24 in) in length. Its native habitat is the Western Pacific, stretching from the Pacific coast of Japan in the north, through the east coast of Korea, down the coast of China and the Yellow Sea, as far as Taiwan in the south.
