= Circle hook =

Fish hook which is sharply curved back in a circular shape

External videos
- Best way to rig a lure with a circle hook YouTube

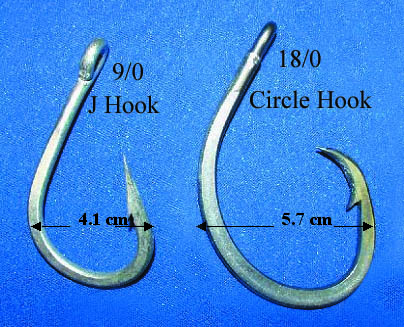
Difference between a traditional J-hook (left) and a circle hook (right)

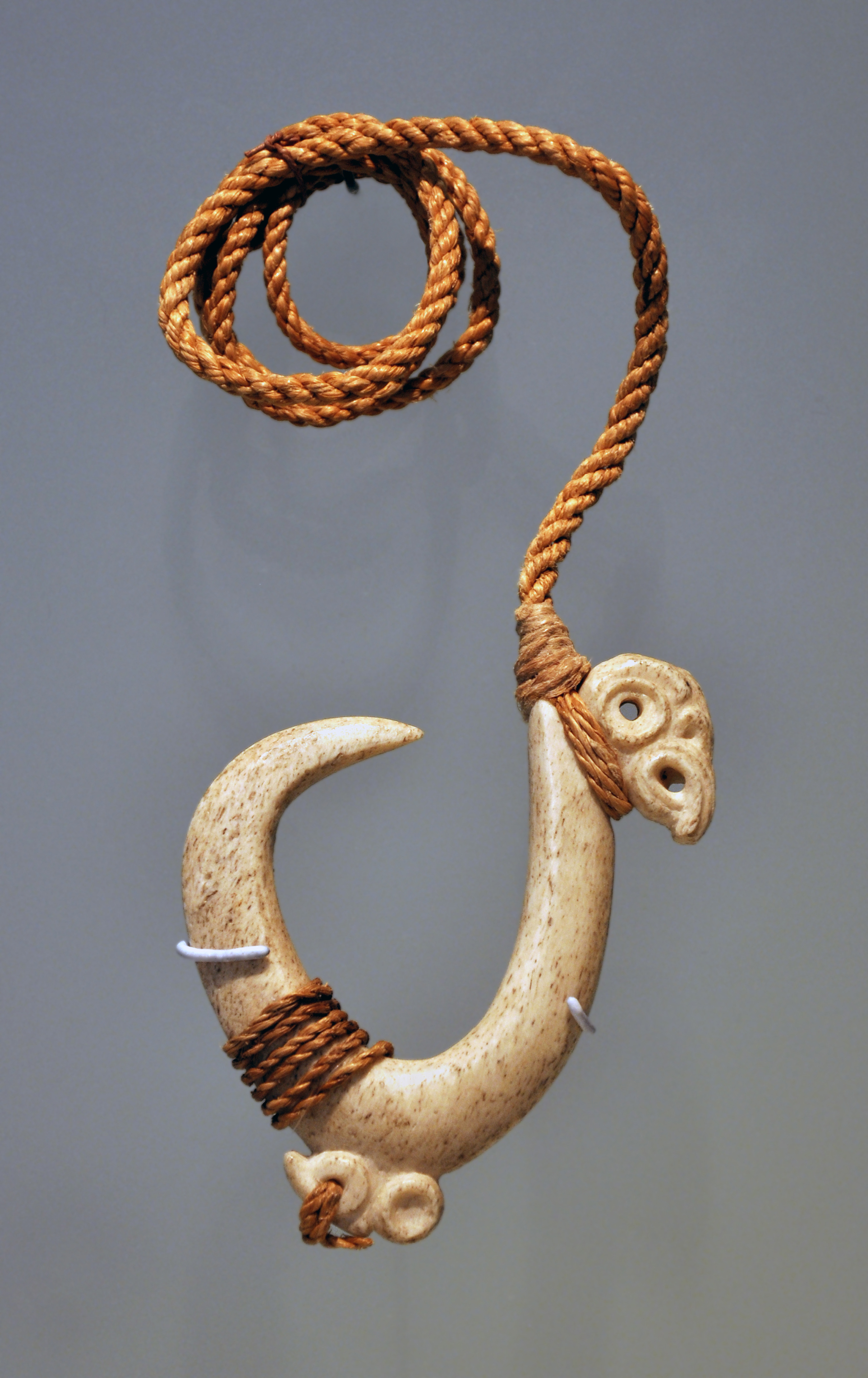
Traditional Māori bone matau, or fishhook. The shape avoids stress concentrations which could break the bone. The hole on the underside is for attaching bait.

A circle hook is a type of fish hook which is sharply curved back in a circular shape. The hook is designed to slide out of the throat and rotate into the corner of the fish's mouth, which often results in hooking the jaw or lip of the fish during the hook-set. This design lowers the mortality rates of released fish compared to J-hook (like O'Shaughnessy or Octopus hooks) which are often swallowed and can damage the gills or vital organs.

== Difference between J-Hook and circle hook ==
J-hook has a rounded throat, an upward-facing point, a straight medium-sized shank that is slightly longer than the point, and a small brazed eye. Circle hooks have a circular bend, a medium-length shank, and a sharp inward-facing point.

There is also a difference in the hook-set mechanism where the circle hook's shape allows it to only hook onto an exposed surface, which in the case of a fish is typically the lip or corner of its mouth. When the fish takes the baited circle hook and swallows it, and as the hook is reeled in, or the fish swims away, it is designed to be safely pulled out of the fish until it reaches the mouth. At this point it will catch the corner of the mouth, resulting in fewer gut-hooked fish.

Unlike with j-hooks, an angler doesn't need to strike to set the circle hook.

Circle hooks has become widely used among billfish anglers in past years because the hook generally catches more billfish and rarely hooks the gut. Studies have shown that circle hooks do less damage to billfish than the traditional J-hooks, yet they are just as effective for catching billfish. This is good for conservation, since it improves survival rates after release.
