= Sôhachi =

Sôhachi might refer to two species of flatfish from the family Pleuronectidae:

- Cleisthenes herzensteini
- Cleisthenes pinetorum
