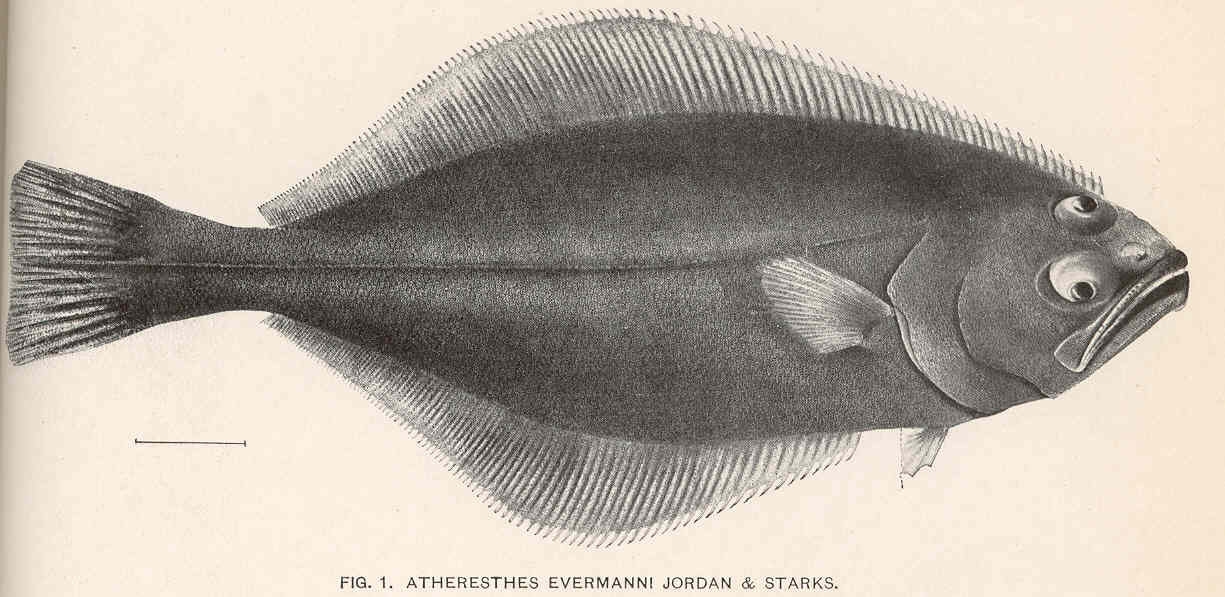

Conservation status
- Least Concern (IUCN 3.1)

Scientific classification
- Kingdom: Animalia
- Phylum: Chordata
- Class: Actinopterygii
- Order: Carangiformes
- Suborder: Pleuronectoidei
- Family: Pleuronectidae
- Genus: Atheresthes
- Species: A. evermanni

Binomial name
- Atheresthes evermanni D. S. Jordan & Starks, 1904

Synonyms
- Reinhardtius evermanni (Jordan & Starks, 1904); Reinhardtius oleosus Tanaka, 1918

= Kamchatka flounder =

Species of fish

The Kamchatka flounder, Atheresthes evermanni, is a flatfish of the family Pleuronectidae. It is a demersal fish that lives at depths of between 20 metres (66 ft) and 1,200 metres (3,900 ft). Its native habitat is the temperate waters of the northern Pacific. It can grow as long as 100 centimetres (39 in) in length, and can weigh up to 8.5 kilograms (19 lb).

== Range ==
The native habitat of the Kamchatka flounder ranges from the Shelikof Strait and the Aleutian Islands in Alaska, across the Bering Sea, to the Gulf of Anadyr, Kamchatka Peninsula and the seas of Okhotsk and Japan.

In the east of its range the Kamchatka flounder overlaps with the range of the arrowtooth flounder, and similarities in appearance between the two species mean that they were not distinguished in commercial fishing until 2007.

== Diet ==
The Kamchatka flounder's diet consists of fish and zoobenthos organisms such as squid, cuttlefish, shrimps, prawns, amphipods, mysids, mollusks and marine worms, though the most important prey item is the walleye pollock, which accounted for 56-86% of stomach contents by weight in one study.

== Predators ==
Kamchatka flounder have been found in the stomachs of only 17 different species of fish in the Bering Sea and Aleutian Islands, including Pacific cod, Pacific halibut, pollock, arrowtooth flounder and sculpin.

== Commercial fishing ==
A market has developed for Kamchatka flounder and as such it is targeted by the commercial fishing industry. Catches have risen from 1,183 tons in 2007 to 19,662 tons in 2010 (prior to 2007 Kamchatcka flounder was not differentiated from the arrowtooth flounder catch; it is estimated that around 10% of the arrowtooth flounder catch was Kamchatka flounder). Total biomass was estimated at 128,800 tons in 2010.
