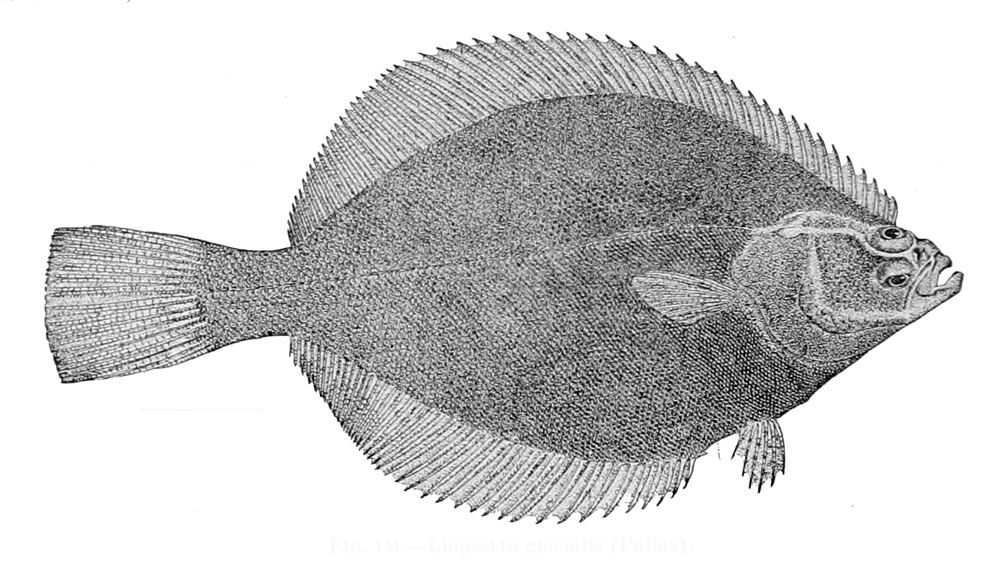

Conservation status
- Least Concern (IUCN 3.1)

Scientific classification
- Kingdom: Animalia
- Phylum: Chordata
- Class: Actinopterygii
- Division: Teleostei
- Order: Carangiformes
- Suborder: Pleuronectoidei
- Family: Pleuronectidae
- Genus: Liopsetta
- Species: L. glacialis

Binomial name
- Liopsetta glacialis (Pallas, 1776)

Synonyms
- Pleuronectes glacialis Pallas, 1776; Pleuronectes cicatricosus Pallas, 1814; Platessa dwinensis Lilljeborg, 1851; Pleuronectes franklinii Günther, 1862

= Arctic flounder =

Species of fish

The Arctic flounder (Liopsetta glacialis), also known as the Christmas flounder, eelback flounder and Polar plaice, is a flatfish of the family Pleuronectidae. It is a demersal fish that lives on coastal mud bottoms in salt, brackish and fresh waters at depths of up to 90 metres (300 ft). Its native habitat is the polar waters of the northeastern Atlantic and Arctic oceans, from the White and Barents seas to the coasts of Siberia in Russia and Queen Maud Gulf in Canada, and from the Chuckchi and Bering seas to Bristol Bay in Alaska and the northern Sea of Okhotsk. It can grow up to 35 centimetres (14 in) in length.

== Description ==
The Arctic flounder is a right-eyed flatfish. Its upper side is dark olive green to dark brown in colour, sometimes with black spots or dark patches; its underside is white. Its fins are pale brown, sometimes with a yellow tinge or faint dark spots.

== Diet ==
The diet of the Arctic flounder consists mainly of small fish and zoobenthos invertebrates such as amphipods, molluscs and marine worms.
