= Far Eastern smooth flounder =

Scientific classification
- Kingdom: Animalia
- Phylum: Chordata
- Class: Actinopterygii
- Order: Carangiformes
- Suborder: Pleuronectoidei
- Family: Pleuronectidae
- Genus: Liopsetta
- Species: L. pinnifasciata

Binomial name
- Liopsetta pinnifasciata (Kner, 1870)

Synonyms
- Pleuronectes pinnifasciatus Kner, 1870

Species of fish

The Far Eastern smooth flounder (Liopsetta pinnifasciata) is a flatfish of the family Pleuronectidae. It is a demersal fish that lives on bottoms in salt, brackish and fresh waters. Its native habitat is the temperate waters of the northwestern Pacific, specifically Japan, Russia and the Kuril Islands. It can grow up to 50 centimetres (20 in) in length.
