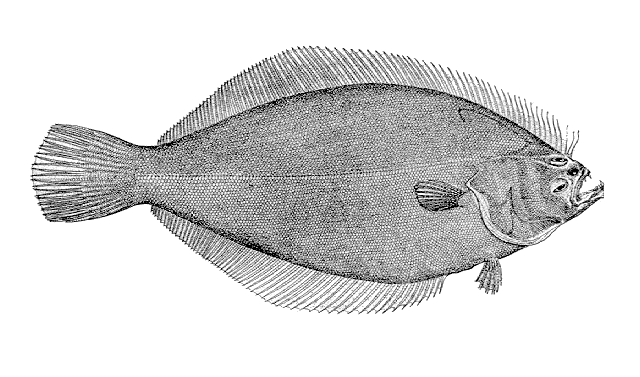

Conservation status
- Least Concern (IUCN 3.1)

Scientific classification
- Kingdom: Animalia
- Phylum: Chordata
- Class: Actinopterygii
- Order: Carangiformes
- Suborder: Pleuronectoidei
- Family: Pleuronectidae
- Subfamily: Pleuronectinae
- Genus: Psettichthys; Girard, 1854
- Species: P. melanostictus

Binomial name
- Psettichthys melanostictus Girard, 1854

= Pacific sand sole =

Species of fish

The Pacific sand sole (Psettichthys melanostictus), also known as simply sand sole, is a species of flatfish found in the north-eastern Pacific waters where it lives on sandy bottoms. It is the only species in the genus Psettichthys, and ranges from the Bering Sea to northern California.

== Description and taxonomy ==
The Pacific sand sole, belongs to the order Pleuronectiformes, and the family Pleuronectidae. They are considered a flatfish due to their body shape, just like Hippoglossus (halibuts), Solea (soles), and Platichthys (flounders). This fish can get over 62.95 cm (24.78 in) in length and on average this fish can weigh approximately 2.484 kg (5.476 lbs). Their dorsal side, which houses both of their eyes, can come in a variety of colors like gray, green, or brown, with blotches of dark brown or black. Their underside or ventral side is usually white. By obtaining these colors, the pacific sand sole fish can have a better advantage of camouflaging into their surroundings; making them harder to see by their prey.

== Life cycle ==
When they are first born, their eyes are on both sides of their body like other fish. However, when the Pacific sand sole starts to mature, one of their eyes starts to migrate to either the left or the right side of their body, just like a flounder when their eyes migrate. From that point, their eyes will stay that way. They will live on the bottom of the ocean, on the sand, lying on one side of their body, while both of their eyes are on top of their body.

== Habitat ==
These fish can be found in and around the Bering Sea, all the way down to Southern California, in the northern Pacific Ocean. These fish will stay on the bottom of the ocean at an average depth of 155 m (508.53 ft). They live on the sandy bottoms of the ocean. They feed on other fish, worms, crustaceans, and molluscs.
