= Cleisthenes (disambiguation) =

Cleisthenes can refer to:

- Cleisthenes, the reformer of ancient Athens.
- Cleisthenes of Sicyon, the ancient tyrant of Sicyon.
- Cleisthenes (son of Sibyrtius), an Athenian theoros satirized by Aristophanes
- Cleisthenes (fish), a genus of flounders.
