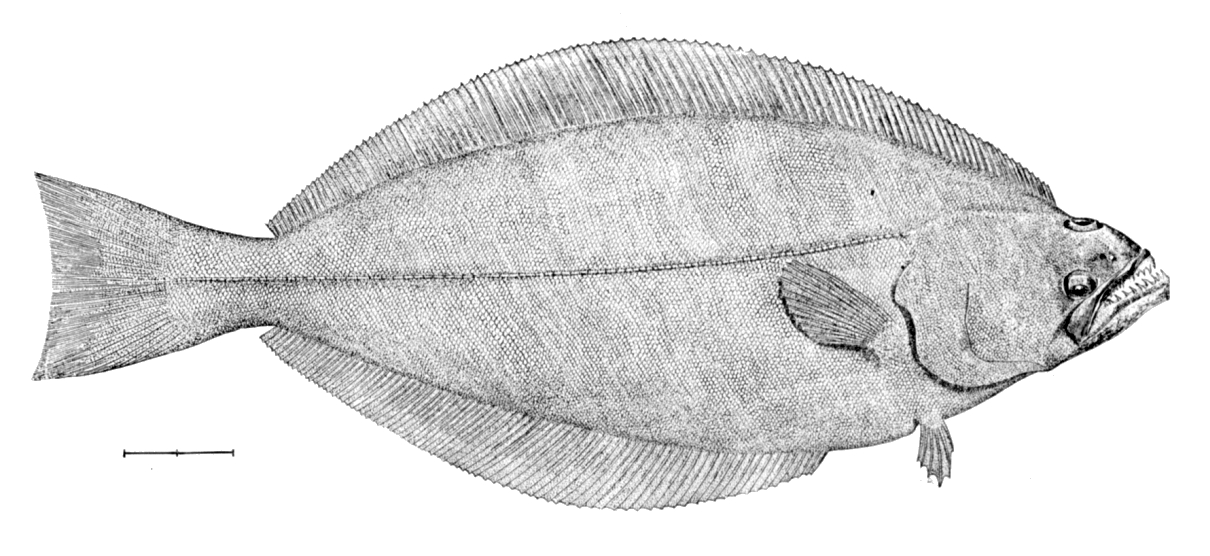

Conservation status
- Near Threatened (IUCN 3.1)

Scientific classification
- Kingdom: Animalia
- Phylum: Chordata
- Class: Actinopterygii
- Division: Teleostei
- Order: Carangiformes
- Suborder: Pleuronectoidei
- Family: Pleuronectidae
- Genus: Reinhardtius; Gill, 1861
- Species: R. hippoglossoides

Binomial name
- Reinhardtius hippoglossoides (Walbaum, 1792)

Synonyms
- Pleuronectes hippoglossoides Walbaum, 1792; Pleuronectes pinguis O. Fabricius, 1824; Hippoglossus groenlandicus Günther, 1862; Reinhardtius matsuurae Jordan & Snyder, 1901

= Greenland halibut =

Species of fish

The Greenland halibut or Greenland turbot (Reinhardtius hippoglossoides) belongs to the family Pleuronectidae (the right-eye flounders), and is the only species of the genus Reinhardtius. It is a predatory fish that mostly ranges at depths between 500 and 1,000 m (1,600–3,300 ft), and is found in the cold northern Atlantic, northern Pacific, and Arctic Oceans.

It has a variety of other English vernacular names, including black halibut, blue halibut, lesser halibut, and Newfoundland turbot; while both Newfoundland turbot and Greenland turbot are in common use in North America (sometimes even without the location, just "turbot"), these names are typically not used in Europe, where they can cause easy confusion with the true turbot (Scophthalmus maximus).

The Greenland halibut is fished commercially across its range with disputes over the fishing rights for this species in the Atlantic Ocean off Canada resulting in the Turbot War of the mid-1990s (a "war" without any injuries or casualties).

The Greenland halibut is a flatfish, and the left eye has migrated during the fish's development so that it is on the right side of the head. However, in this fish, it has not moved as far as in bottom-dwelling flatfish and the fish can probably see forwards. The Greenland halibut can swim in a vertical position and both sides of its body are a speckled brown colour, but the left side is rather paler than the right.

The Hellefisk Fjord in Greenland is named after this fish, hellefisk being the Danish name for Greenland halibut.

== Description ==
Its morphology with the left eye positioned on the dorsal ridge of the forehead gives it an appearance of a cyclops when looking straight at it. The central position of the left eye in the Greenland halibut probably gives it a much wider range of peripheral vision in comparison to other flatfish, where the eye has migrated completely. Its body shape is elongated and compressed dorsoventrally and muscles on both sides are equally developed. Both sides are pigmented, but the left blind side is slightly lighter in color than the right side. The maximum length is about 120 cm (3.9 ft) and the maximum weight is about 45 kg (99 lb), the normal length is 80–100 cm (2.6–3.3 ft) and they usually weigh 11–25 kg (24–55 lb).

== Distribution and habitat ==
The Greenland halibut is a cold-water species found at depths from near the surface to 2,200 m (7,200 ft), but mainly between 500 and 1,000 m (1,600 and 3,300 ft). It is mainly found in waters with temperatures from 1 to 4 °C (34–39 °F), but has also been observed at subzero temperatures down to −2.1 °C (28.2 °F). It has a circumpolar distribution in the Northern Hemisphere and is found in both the North Atlantic and the North Pacific Oceans. In the North Pacific, it ranges from the Sea of Japan near Honshu northwards to the Chukchi Sea, east through the Aleutian Islands, and south as far as northern Baja California in Mexico. In the North Atlantic, it occurs from the British Isles to northern Norway, Faroe Islands, Iceland, and eastern Greenland in the east and from Newfoundland to northwestern Greenland in the west.

== Biology ==
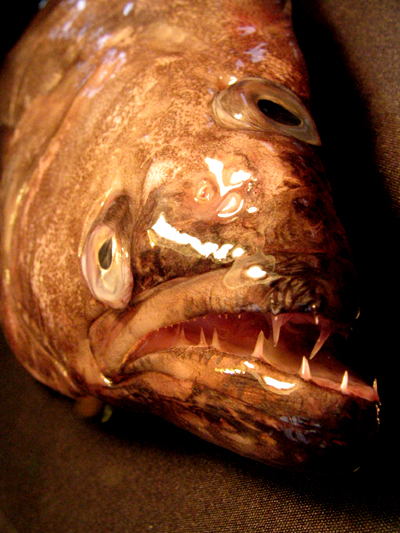
Close-up of the head, showing the strong teeth of this predatory species (upperside of fish on left, underside on right)

As a species of flatfish, it is presumed that this fish would be primarily associated with the seabed, however, tagging information shows that they spend time both close to the seabed and with frequent excursions into the water column, presumably for feeding. These movements up into the water column explain why it is often caught pelagically. It has been speculated that when in the water column they will swim in a vertical position, but data from data storage tags do not support this hypothesis.

Greenland halibut are opportunistic predators and consume a variety of prey from demersal and pelagic habitats. Generally, individuals less than 20 cm in length feed upon small crustaceans, such as amphipods. As they grow, their diet shifts and they begin to feed upon shrimps and fish, and individuals greater than 60 cm (24 in) are primarily piscivorous. Their diet also varies spatially, reflecting the availability of different prey items in different areas. In the north-east Arctic, squid and fish, such as Atlantic herring, capelin and Atlantic cod, are important components of their diet, with squid making up a greater component of the diet of smaller individuals. In the Beaufort Sea and eastern Canada, polar cod and gelatinous snailfish are important prey items while in the shrimp grounds of west Greenland, shrimp and redfish are the primary prey. They are known to feed on significant quantities of offal discarded from fishing vessels.

Greenland halibut spawn from January–March. During spawning, Greenland halibut will perform spawning rises where they will rise up through the water column from deep water to depths of around 200–350 m where they will release their eggs and sperm before descending back to deeper water. Females will release one batch of eggs each year thereafter while the males will spawn with multiple females over the course of the spawning season. The eggs and larvae remain suspended in the water column throughout development and complete their metamorphosis on attaining a length of 6–8.5 cm (2.4–3.3 in)

Greenland halibut have an unusual form of gonad development in comparison with many other fish species. They will develop two groups of oocytes concurrently, one group will be spawned in the current spawning cycle, the other will be spawned in the next spawning cycle. The reason for this is due to the large eggs (2.5-3.0 mm in diameter) and in the cold water which they inhabit, it takes more than one year for oocytes to complete vitellogenesis. If they were to develop one group of oocytes at a time, they would be able to spawn only every two years.

== Fishing and conservation ==
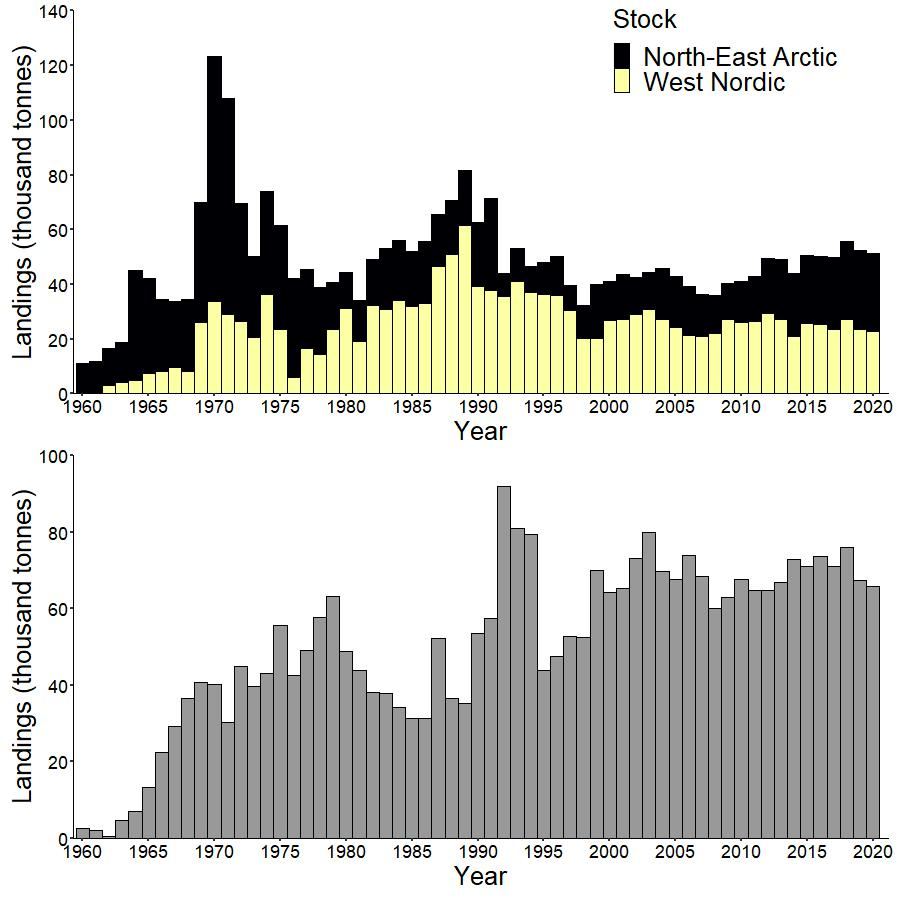
Landings of Greenland halibut (Reinhardtius hippoglossoides) in the eastern (top) and western (bottom) Atlantic ocean. Landings from the eastern Atlantic are split into the north-east Arctic stock and the west Nordic stock.Data from ICES and NAFO.

Greenland halibut are fished commercially by several countries, including Russia, Norway, Iceland, Germany, Spain, Greenland and Canada, and are caught using a variety of gear, including bottom trawls, longline and gillnets. Reported landings have been around 50–140 thousand metric tonnes per year since 1960. Fishing is the most important industry in Greenland, and Greenland halibut is the second-most important species (after northern prawn), meaning that any changes can have a significant effect on the country's overall economy, as well as the local economy as most inshore fisheries involve small-scale, small-boat fishers. Similarly, the fishery for Greenland halibut is very important to some First Nations and Inuit communities in Canada.

The species is not threatened overall, and it can be locally abundant, but it is near threatened. Until the 1970s, the species declined due to overfishing, but since the 1980s, an overall slight increase has been seen, although some local populations have further declined. The primary threat is overfishing. Secondary threats are related to their deep-water spawning grounds. Some are in areas with oil and gas extraction. Other spawning grounds are in deep, near-shore regions where the ecosystem relies on nutrients from meltwater from glaciers, but these are gradually disappearing.

In 2010, Greenpeace International added the Greenland halibut to its seafood red list because some fishing for the Greenland halibut is by bottom trawl, which can cause significant environmental damage, and some populations appear to be overfished. In coastal regions and some offshore regions, fishing for Greenland halibut mainly is done by deep-sea long line fishing (out of reach of seabirds and too cold for sea turtles, issues for this fishing type elsewhere in shallower and warmer waters) and stationary bottom gillnets, which does not cause the same damage as bottom trawling. In 2017, the Marine Stewardship Council certified that the fishery for Greenland halibut was sustainable. Because Canada and Greenland share the offshore populations in the Davis Strait–Baffin Bay region in between them, the two have shared the fishing quota and follow the same guidelines in this region. Offshore populations in this region are healthy, stable and well-managed, but in more coastal areas some populations have fallen due to overfishing, although they do get a regular input of young fish from the stable offshore populations. Deals on fishing quotas for offshore fishing for Greenland halibut and other species have also been reached between Greenland, the Faroe Islands, Norway, and Russia. Among well-monitored populations, the ones in the East Greenland–Iceland region (i.e., Greenland Sea, Denmark Strait and nearby) experienced the greatest decline since the 1970s. In 2019, the parties agreed on a reduction of fishing for Greenland halibut in the Greenland Sea region, following recommendations by biologists. In some inshore waters of Greenland, fishing quotas for Greenland halibut have been temporarily raised several times, contrary to recommendations by fisheries biologists, and leading to recommendations of a clearer separation of decisions on quotas and the Greenlandic Government (decisions not fully left to Greenland's Fisheries Commission). A smaller fishery for the species also exists in the Gulf of Alaska (where relatively uncommon) and the Bering Sea region (where more common), and these populations are not overfished.

The oil-rich, soft meat is regarded as good, but inferior to that of the Atlantic halibut and European turbot. Traditionally, it was salted, but today it is mostly smoked or frozen, and the primary market is in East Asia, where it is regarded as a delicacy. However, because of the thick skin, high fat content, and low meat yield, as much as one-third of the fish can be lost in production. In Greenland, the remains are often used as food for the sled dogs (Greenland Dogs).
