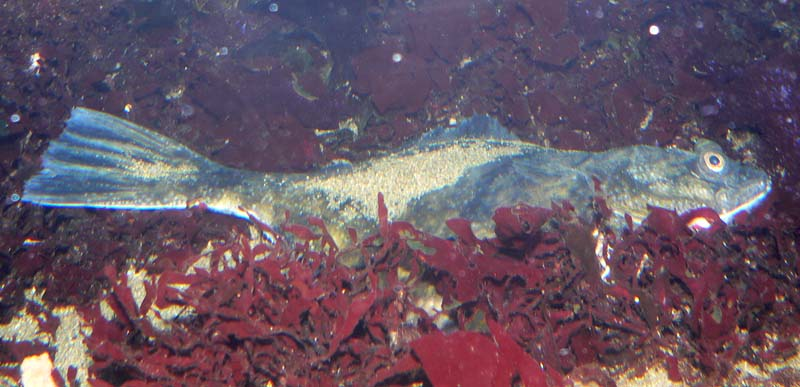

Conservation status
- Least Concern (IUCN 3.1)

Scientific classification
- Kingdom: Animalia
- Phylum: Chordata
- Class: Actinopterygii
- Division: Teleostei
- Order: Carangiformes
- Suborder: Pleuronectoidei
- Family: Pleuronectidae
- Subfamily: Pleuronectinae
- Genus: Parophrys; Girard, 1854
- Species: P. vetulus

Binomial name
- Parophrys vetulus Girard, 1854
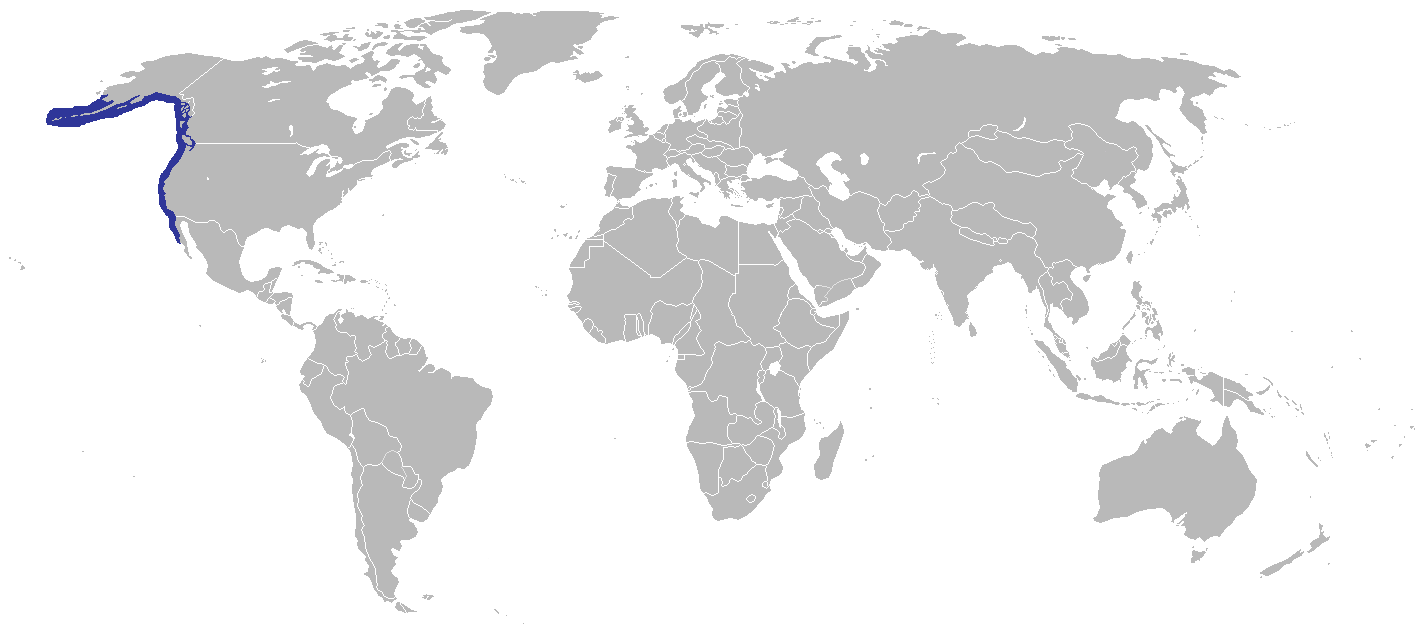
- Range of the English sole

Synonyms
- Pleuronectes vetulus (Girard, 1854); Parophrys hubbardii Gill, 1862; Pleuronectes digrammus Günther, 1862

= English sole =

Species of fish

The English sole (Parophrys vetulus) is a species of flatfish in the family Pleuronectidae. It is a demersal fish that lives on sandy and muddy bottoms in estuaries and near shore areas, at depths of up to 550 metres (1,800 ft). It reaches up to 57 centimetres (22 in) in length, and can weigh up to 1.5 kilograms (3.3 lb). Its native habitat is the eastern Pacific, stretching from the coast of Baja California in the south to the Bering Sea in the north.

The English sole is an important commercial fish, primarily caught off Washington, Oregon and California. Though biomass is increasing, catches have been declining since the 1960s and are currently almost at an all-time low.

English sole is known in Spanish as platija limón, or lemon sole, a name by which it is also known in English, though the true lemon sole is a separate species, Microstomus kitt.

== Etymology ==
The genus name is derived from the Greek para, meaning "near", ophrys, meaning "eyebrow", and the species name vetulus is a word meaning "old man".

== Description ==
The English sole is a right-eyed flatfish with a compressed, diamond-shaped body and a small head with a pointed snout and small, asymmetric mouth. The upper surface is covered in rough scales and is usually uniformly brown, but occasionally speckled; the lower surface is smooth, and white to pale yellow in colour. The dorsal and ventral fin edges are dark. The lateral line is mostly straight, but curves slightly around the pectoral fin.

== Diet ==
The diet of the English sole consists of zoobenthos organisms, primarily marine worms, molluscs, crustaceans and echinoderms. English sole feed by day, using both sight and smell, and often dig for food.

== Commercial fishing ==
The English sole is an important commercial fish, and has been fished in the Eastern Pacific, almost exclusively by trawler, since 1876. Two fisheries exist: one on the West Coast of the United States, off Washington, Oregon and California, and one in the Bering Sea off Alaska. The majority of English sole landed is from the West Coast fishery.

Although biomass is increasing, catches have been steadily decreasing since the 1960s — though catches peaked in the southern area in 1929 with 3,976 tonnes (3,913 long tons; 4,383 short tons) landed, and in the north in 1949 at 4,008 tonnes (3,945 long tons; 4,418 short tons). This decline is estimated to be due to a combination of market factors and management restrictions placed on fishing trawlers in order to protect other bottom-dwelling species. However, the level of exploitation of this species has been low since 1997 within the Bering Sea and Aleutian Islands region, while it has been low for approximately 30 years on the West Coast of the United States, and most take occurs as bycatch.
