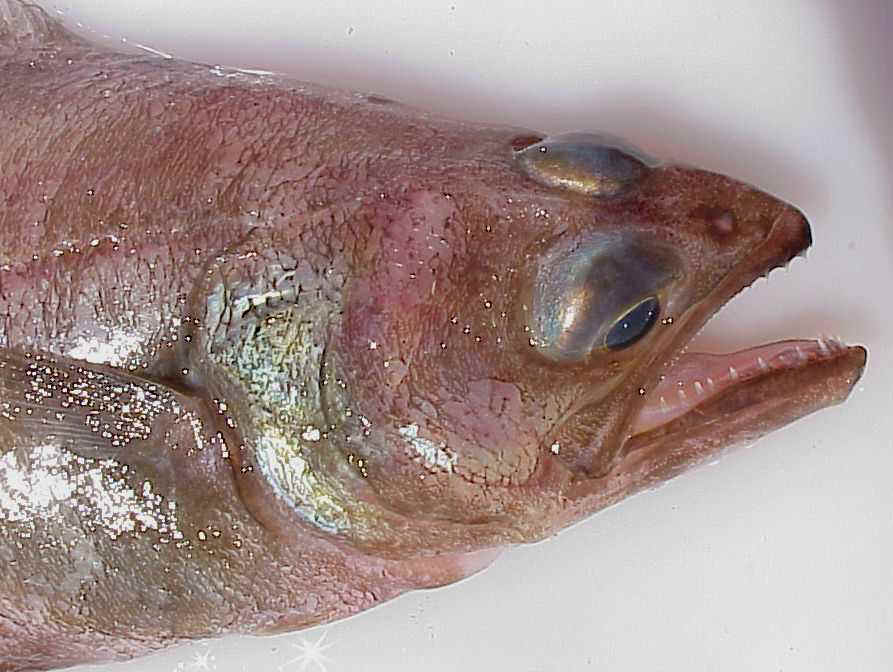

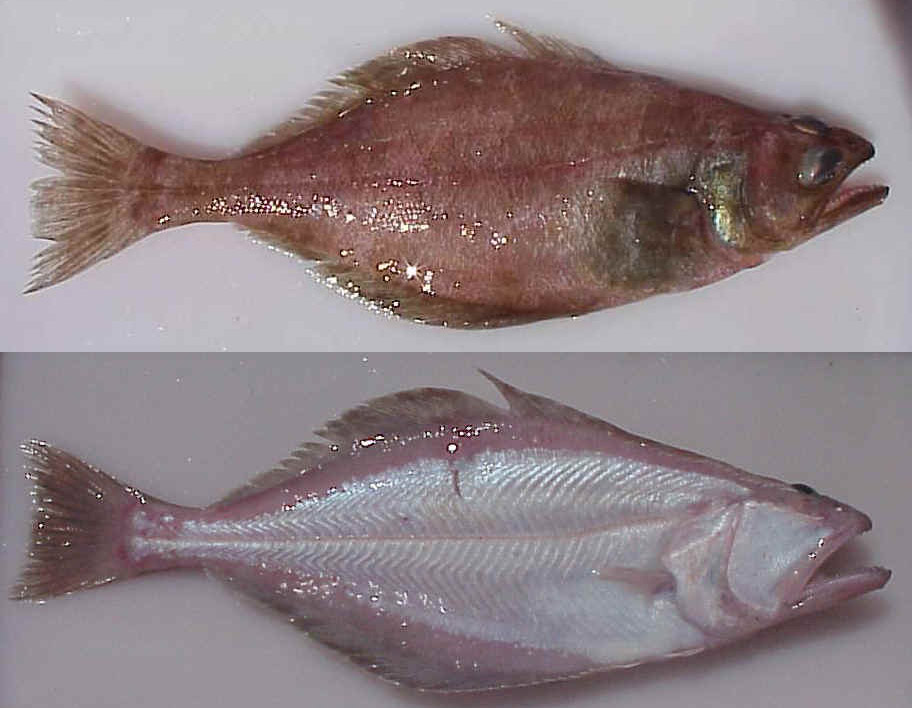

Conservation status
- Least Concern (IUCN 3.1)

Scientific classification
- Kingdom: Animalia
- Phylum: Chordata
- Class: Actinopterygii
- Order: Carangiformes
- Suborder: Pleuronectoidei
- Family: Pleuronectidae
- Genus: Atheresthes
- Species: A. stomias

Binomial name
- Atheresthes stomias (Jordan & Gilbert, 1880)

Synonyms
- Platysomatichthys stomias Jordan & Gilbert, 1880; Reinhardtius stomias (Jordan & Gilbert, 1880)

= Arrowtooth flounder =

Arrowtooth flounder (Atheresthes stomias)

Species of fish

The arrowtooth flounder (Atheresthes stomias) is a fish in the family Pleuronectidae. It can be caught from the Bering Sea to Santa Rosa Island, California. At present, it is the most common fish in the Gulf of Alaska. Data is insufficient for many of the flounder's general traits, including size and age of sexual maturity. Spawning is known to occur from December through February and the species can live up to 27 years.

If not properly handled, the flesh of an arrowtooth flounder can soften, due to a proteolytic enzyme which is emitted from a myxosporean parasite that softens the flesh when heated, lowering value and marketability. To make it more marketable, arrowtooth is usually sold on the West Coast as turbot, although it is not related to the true turbot. Additives have been created to combat the softening of flesh, creating economic feasibility for the catching of the flounder.
