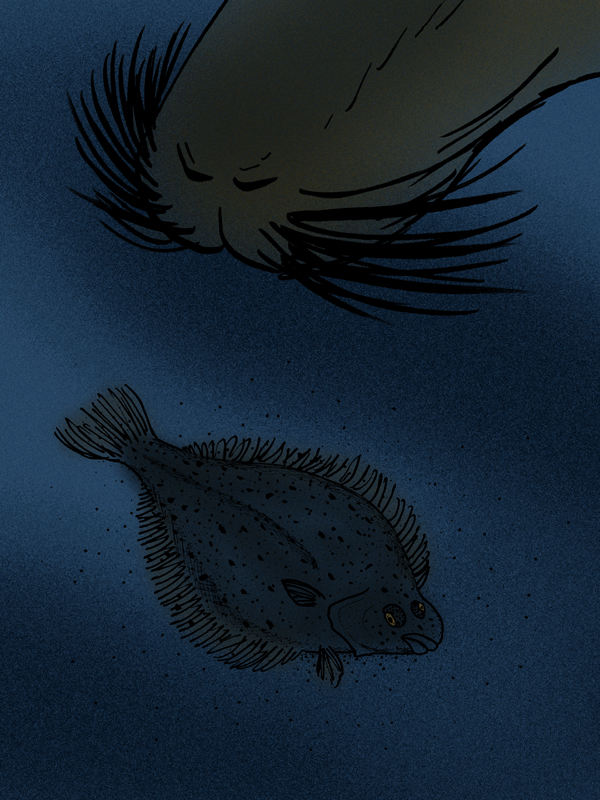
- Artist's reconstruction

Scientific classification
- Domain: Eukaryota
- Kingdom: Animalia
- Phylum: Chordata
- Class: Actinopterygii
- Order: Carangiformes
- Suborder: Pleuronectoidei
- Family: Pleuronectidae
- Genus: †Chibapsetta; Sakamoto & Uyeno, 1988
- Species: †C. dolichurostyli

Binomial name
- †Chibapsetta dolichurostyli Sakamoto & Uyeno, 1988

= Chibapsetta =

Chibapsetta Temporal range: Late Pleistocene

Extinct genus of fish

Chibapsetta is an extinct genus of prehistoric right-eye flounder that lived during the Pleistocene epoch. It contains a single species, C. dolichurostyli from what is now Tōgane, Japan. Some authors instead place its stratigraphic range as Late Pliocene.

Although its exact subfamilial placement is uncertain, it may be related to Hippoglossoides.

== See also ==
- Prehistoric fish
- List of prehistoric bony fish
