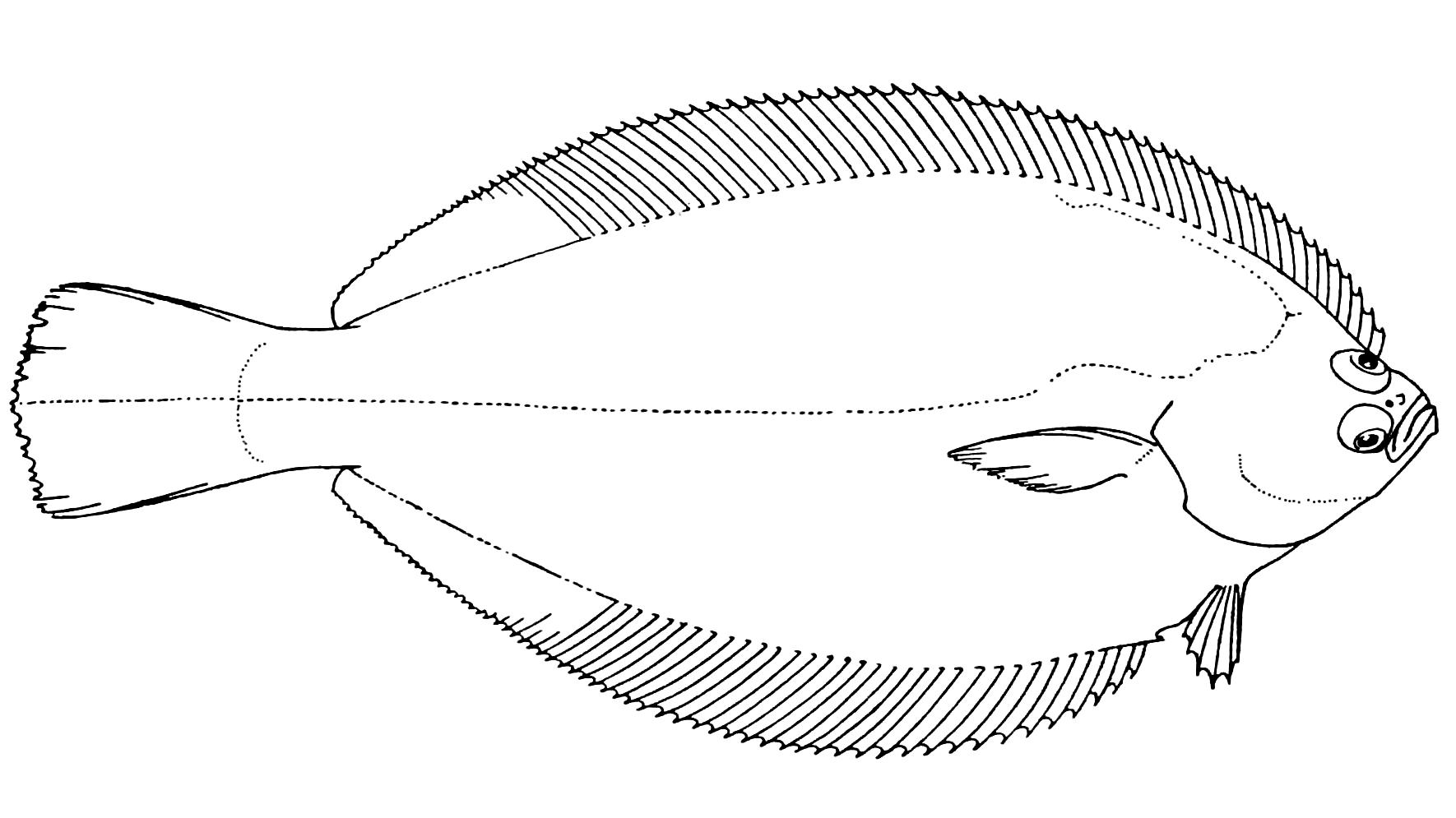

Scientific classification
- Kingdom: Animalia
- Phylum: Chordata
- Class: Actinopterygii
- Order: Carangiformes
- Suborder: Pleuronectoidei
- Family: Pleuronectidae
- Subfamily: Pleuronectinae
- Genus: Isopsetta; Lockington, 1883
- Species: I. isolepis

Binomial name
- Isopsetta isolepis (Lockington, 1880)

Synonyms
- Lepidopsetta isolepis Lockington, 1880; Pleuronectes isolepis (Lockington, 1880)

= Butter sole =

Species of fish

The butter sole (Isopsetta isolepis) is an edible flatfish of the family Pleuronectidae. It is a demersal fish that lives on soft, silty bottoms in temperate waters at depths between 20 and 425 m (66 and 1,394 ft). Its native habitat is the northeastern Pacific, from the Bering Sea and the Aleutian Islands, along the coasts of Alaska, Canada, and the USA as far south as Ventura, California. It grows up to 55 cm (22 in) in length, and can live for up to 11 years.

== Description ==
The butter sole is a right-eyed flounder with an oval-shaped body. Its upper side is light to dark or greyish brown, with yellow or green mottling; its underside is white. The scales on the upper side are rough. The dorsal and anal fins have bright yellow edges; the caudal fin is rounded and forms a broad V shape. The lateral line curves slightly around the pectoral fin. The mouth is small, with blunt teeth that are stronger on the underside. The eyes are small, and close together.

== Diet ==
The butter sole's diet consists of benthic organisms such as crabs, shrimp, worms, and sand dollars, as well as young herring.
