= Cleisthenes herzensteini =

Scientific classification
- Kingdom: Animalia
- Phylum: Chordata
- Class: Actinopterygii
- Order: Carangiformes
- Suborder: Pleuronectoidei
- Family: Pleuronectidae
- Genus: Cleisthenes
- Species: C. herzensteini

Binomial name
- Cleisthenes herzensteini (Schmidt, 1904)

Synonyms
- Hippoglossoides herzensteini Schmidt, 1904

Species of fish

Cleisthenes herzensteini is a flatfish of the family Pleuronectidae. It is a demersal fish that lives on bottoms in the temperate waters of the northwest Pacific, from the Sea of Okhotsk to the Sea of Japan, Yellow Sea, Gulf of Bohai and the East China Sea. It can grow up to 47 centimetres (19 in) in length, though its length is typically around 31 centimetres (12 in). Its maximum recorded weight is 1.215 kilograms (2.68 lb), and it can live for up to 15 years.

== Nomenclature ==
Both species in the genus Cleisthenes – Cleisthenes herzensteini and Cleisthenes pinetorum – are commonly known as sôhachi in Japan.

== Diet ==
The diet of Cleisthenes herzensteini consists of zoobenthos organisms, including fish and crustaceans such as crabs, shrimp and prawns.
