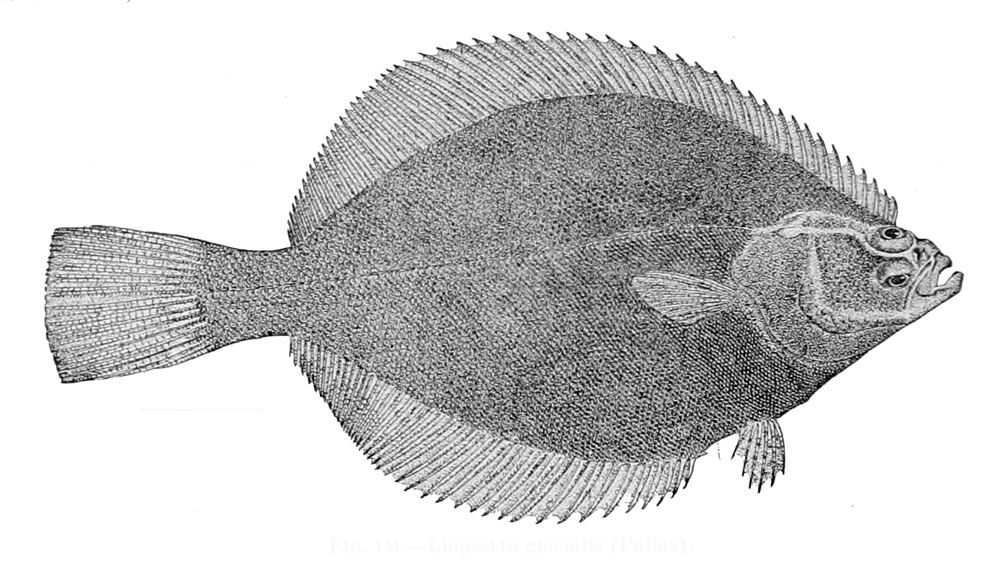
- Arctic Flounder (L. glacialis)

Scientific classification
- Domain: Eukaryota
- Kingdom: Animalia
- Phylum: Chordata
- Class: Actinopterygii
- Order: Carangiformes
- Suborder: Pleuronectoidei
- Family: Pleuronectidae
- Subfamily: Pleuronectinae
- Genus: Liopsetta; Gill, 1864

Type species
- Platessa glabra Storer 1843

Synonyms
- Euchalarodus Gill, 1864

= Liopsetta =

Genus of fishes

Liopsetta is a genus of righteye flounders native to the northern oceans.

== Species ==
There are currently three recognized species in this genus:

- Liopsetta glacialis (Pallas, 1776) (Arctic flounder)
- Liopsetta pinnifasciata (Kner, 1870) (Far Eastern smooth flounder)
- Liopsetta putnami (Gill, 1864) (American smooth flounder)
