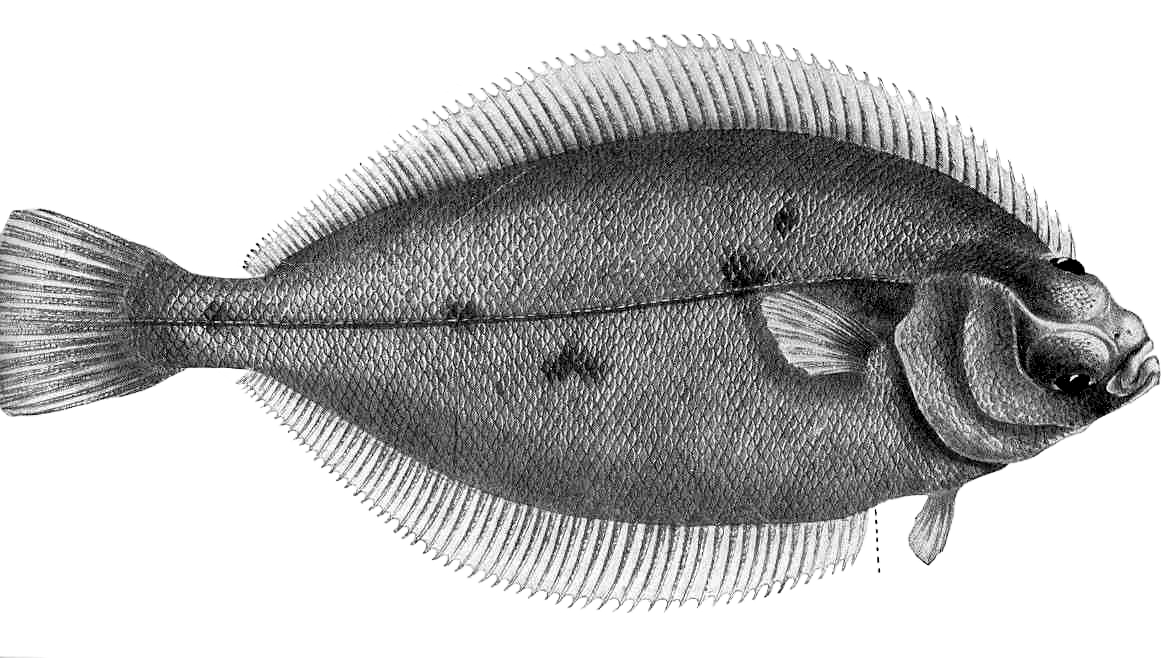

Scientific classification
- Kingdom: Animalia
- Phylum: Chordata
- Class: Actinopterygii
- Order: Carangiformes
- Suborder: Pleuronectoidei
- Family: Pleuronectidae
- Subfamily: Pleuronectinae
- Genus: Dexistes; D. S. Jordan & Starks, 1904
- Species: D. rikuzenius

Binomial name
- Dexistes rikuzenius D. S. Jordan & Starks, 1904

Synonyms
- Araias ariommus Jordan & Starks, 1904

= Rikuzen flounder =

Species of fish

The Rikuzen flounder (Dexistes rikuzenius) is a flatfish of the family Pleuronectidae. It is a demersal fish that lives on sandy and muddy bottoms in temperate waters at depths of between 42 and 200 metres (138 and 656 ft). Its native habitat is the northwestern Pacific, particularly the Sea of Japan and the coastlines of Japan and Korea. It grows up to 22 centimetres (8.7 in) in length.

== Etymology ==
The fish is named after Rikuzen Province, an old province of Japan.

== Diet ==
The Rikuzen flounder's diet consists of benthos invertebrates such as crabs, shrimps, marine worms and brittle stars.
