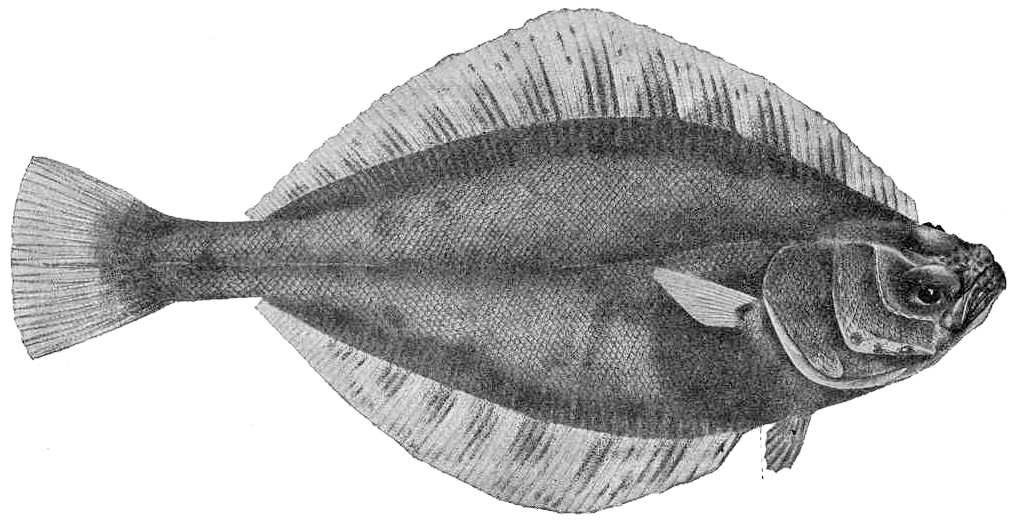

Scientific classification
- Kingdom: Animalia
- Phylum: Chordata
- Class: Actinopterygii
- Order: Carangiformes
- Suborder: Pleuronectoidei
- Family: Pleuronectidae
- Genus: Cleisthenes
- Species: C. pinetorum

Binomial name
- Cleisthenes pinetorum Jordan & Starks, 1904

Synonyms
- Hippoglossoides pinetorum (Jordan & Starks, 1904)

= Cleisthenes pinetorum =

Species of fish

Cleisthenes pinetorum is a flatfish of the family Pleuronectidae. It is a demersal fish that lives on sublittoral sand and mud bottoms at depths of between 50 and 200 metres (160 and 660 ft). Its native habitat is the temperate waters of the northwest Pacific, around Japan, Korea and Taiwan.

== Nomenclature ==
Both species in the genus Cleisthenes - Cleisthenes pinetorum and Cleisthenes herzensteini - are commonly known as Sôhachi in Japan.
