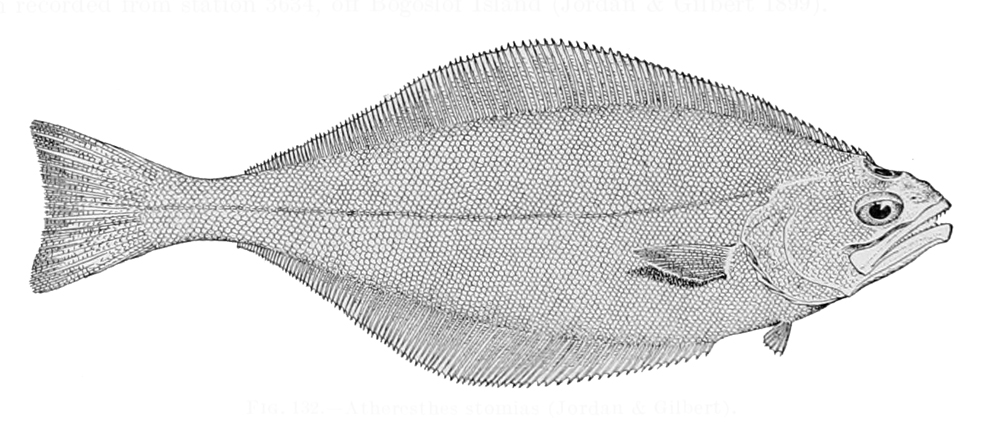

Scientific classification
- Domain: Eukaryota
- Kingdom: Animalia
- Phylum: Chordata
- Class: Actinopterygii
- Order: Carangiformes
- Suborder: Pleuronectoidei
- Family: Pleuronectidae
- Subfamily: Atheresthinae
- Genus: Atheresthes; Jordan & Gilbert, 1880

Type species
- Platysomatichthys stomias Jordan & Gilbert, 1880

= Atheresthes =

Genus of fishes

Atheresthes is a genus of righteye flounders native to the northern Pacific Ocean where both species are important commercially.

== Species ==
There are currently two recognized species in this genus:

- Atheresthes evermanni Jordan & Starks, 1904 (Kamchatka flounder)
- Atheresthes stomias (Jordan & Gilbert, 1880) (Arrowtooth flounder)
