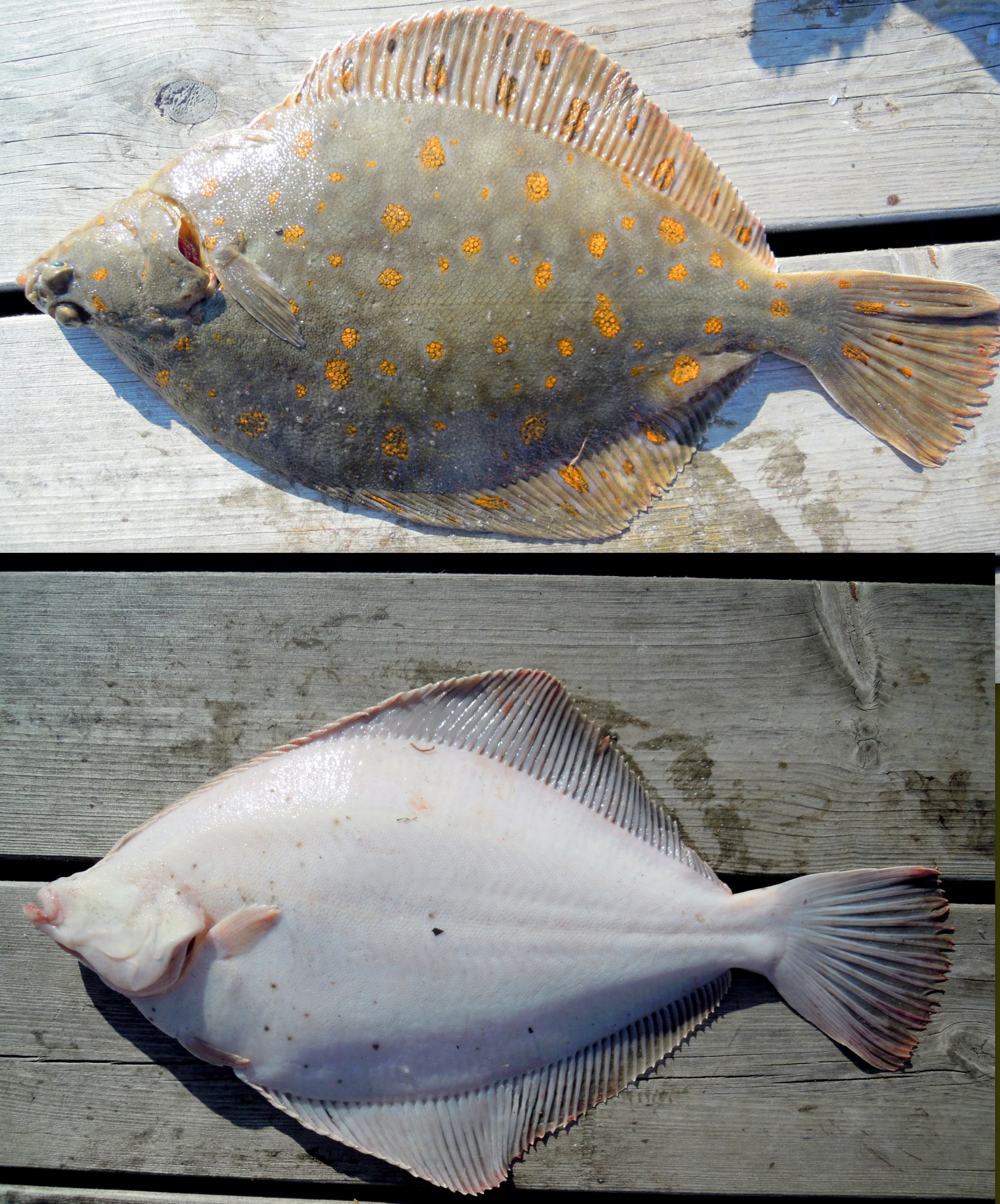
- Pleuronectes platessa

Scientific classification
- Domain: Eukaryota
- Kingdom: Animalia
- Phylum: Chordata
- Class: Actinopterygii
- Order: Carangiformes
- Suborder: Pleuronectoidei
- Family: Pleuronectidae
- Subfamily: Pleuronectinae; Cuvier, 1816

Type genus
- Pleuronectes Linnaeus, 1758

= Pleuronectinae =

Subfamily of fishes

Pleuronectinae is a subfamily of fish in the family Pleuronectidae, comprising 14 genera and 33 species. Members of the subfamily are demersal carnivores that live in arctic and northern seas.

== Taxonomy ==
The following genera are recognised in the subfamily Pleuronectinae:

- Acanthopsetta
- Cleisthenes
- Dexistes
- Hippoglossoides
- Isopsetta
- Lepidopsetta
- Limanda
- Liopsetta
- Myzopsetta
- Parophrys
- Platichthys
- Pleuronectes
- Psettichthys
- Pseudopleuronectes
