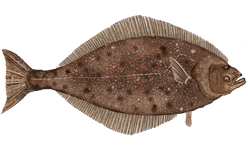
- Hippoglossus stenolepis

Conservation status
- Least Concern (IUCN 3.1)

Scientific classification
- Kingdom: Animalia
- Phylum: Chordata
- Class: Actinopterygii
- Order: Carangiformes
- Suborder: Pleuronectoidei
- Family: Pleuronectidae
- Genus: Hippoglossus
- Species: H. stenolepis

Binomial name
- Hippoglossus stenolepis P. J. Schmidt, 1904
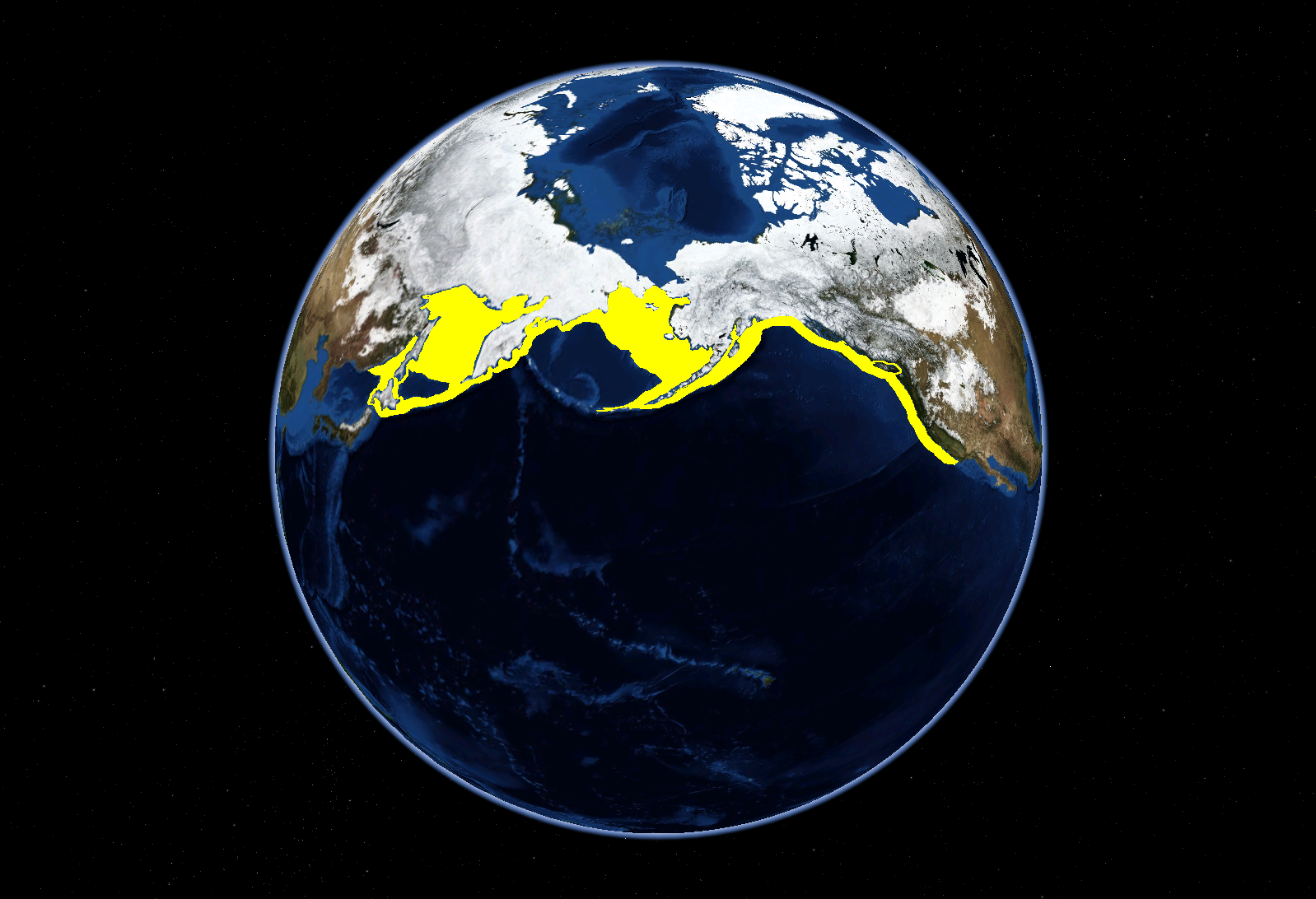
- Range of the Pacific halibut

= Pacific halibut =

Species of fish

Hippoglossus stenolepis, the Pacific halibut, is a species of righteye flounder. This very large species of flatfish is native to the North Pacific and is fished by commercial fisheries, sport fishers, and subsistence fishers.

== Distribution ==
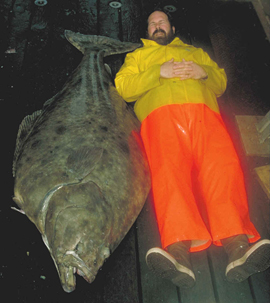
The Pacific halibut is one of the largest flatfish

The Pacific halibut is found on the continental shelf of the North Pacific Ocean and Bering Sea. Fishing for the Pacific halibut is mostly concentrated in the Gulf of Alaska and the Bering Sea, off the west coast of Canada. Small halibut catches are reported in coastal Washington, Oregon, and California. Pacific halibut is broken up into 10 regularity management areas.

Halibut are demersal, living on or near the bottom of the water and prefer water temperatures ranging from 3 to 8 °C (37.4 to 46.4 °F). Pacific halibut belong to the family Pleuronectidae. From November to March, mature halibut concentrate annually on spawning grounds along the edge of the continental shelf at depths from 183 to 457 m (600 to 1,500 ft).

Halibut are strong swimmers and are able to migrate long distances. Halibut of all ages and sizes are involved in a predominantly clockwise (northwest to southeast) migration from their settlement areas (western part of the Gulf of Alaska and Bering Sea), and reproductive fish also make regular seasonal migrations from more shallow feeding grounds in summer to deeper spawning grounds in winter.

== Characteristics ==
Pacific halibut have diamond-shaped bodies. They are more elongated than most flatfishes, their width being about one-third of their length. They have a high arch in the lateral line over the pectoral fin, and a lunate, or crescent-shaped tail, which is different from other flatfishes. Small scales are embedded in the skin. Halibut have both eyes on their dark upper sides. The color on the dark side varies, but tends to assume the coloration of the ocean bottom. The underside is lighter, appearing more like the sky from below. This color adaptation allows halibut to avoid detection by both prey and predator. They are one of the largest flatfish (only surpassed by the closely related Atlantic halibut), and females can weigh up to 230 kg (510 lb) and grow to over 8 ft (2.4 m) long. There are some reports of the fish reaching 363 kg (800 lb), and a photo of a rumored 430 kg (950 lb) 3.5 m (11 ft) Pacific halibut, caught in 1956 near Pelican, Alaska exists.

== Diet ==
Being strong swimmers, halibut are able to eat a large variety of fishes, including cod, turbot, and pollock, and some invertebrates, such as octopus, crab, and shrimp. Sometimes, halibut leave the ocean bottom to feed on pelagic fish, such as salmon, sand lance, and herring, and even seal remains have been found in their stomachs.

== Life cycle ==
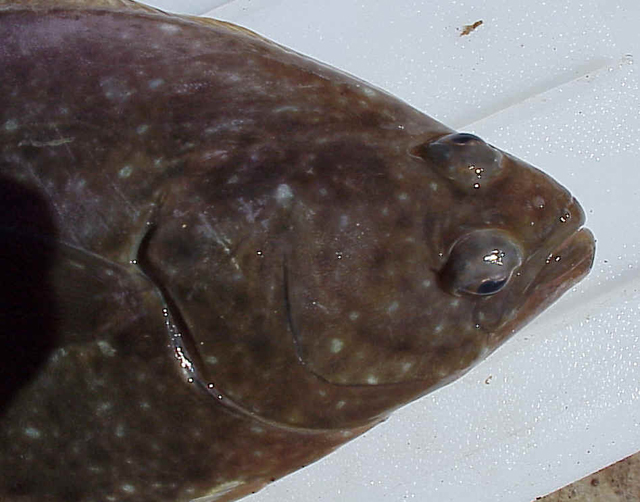
Dorsal (upper) side of head

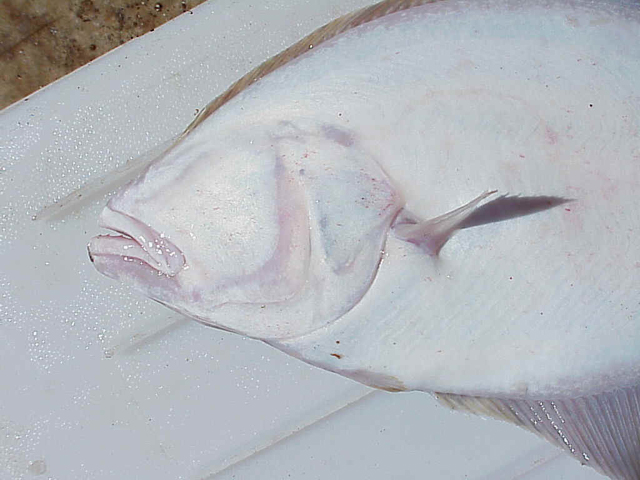
Ventral (lower) side of head

Halibut begin life as larvae in an upright position with an eye on each side of their head. When they are about an inch long, their left eye migrates over their snout to the right side of their heads, and the color of their left side fades.

Spawning takes place during the winter, with the peak of activity occurring from December through February. Most spawning takes place off the edge of the continental shelf in deep waters of 600 to 1,500 ft (183 to 457 m). Male halibut become sexually mature at 7–8 years of age, while females attain sexual maturity at 8–12 years. Females lay 0.5 to 4.0 million eggs annually, depending on the size of the fish.

Fertilized eggs hatch after about 15 days. Free-floating larvae float for up to six months and can be transported several hundred miles counter-clockwise by North Pacific currents. During the free-floating stage, many changes take place in the young halibut, including the movement of the left eye to the right side of the fish. During this time, the young halibut rise to the surface and are carried to shallower water by prevailing currents. At six months, the halibut have their adult form and are about 1.4 in (3.6 cm) long. In the shallower water, young halibut then begin life as bottom-dwellers. Most young halibut ultimately spend from five to seven years in rich, shallow nursery grounds such as the Bering Sea.

Young halibut are highly migratory and generally migrate in a clockwise direction east and south throughout the Gulf of Alaska. Halibut in older age classes tend to be less migratory, but continue to move predominately on a clockwise direction. Mature fish are also involved in winter spawning migrations towards deeper waters, migrating across several areas in some instances. Small, localized spawning populations may occur in deep waters such as in Chatham Strait in northern Southeast Alaska. Because of the free-floating nature of larvae and subsequent mixing of juvenile halibut from throughout the Gulf of Alaska, though, only one genetic stock of halibut is known in the North Pacific.

Halibut growth rates vary depending on locations and habitat conditions, but females grow faster than males. The oldest recorded female and male were 55 years old. The largest recorded sport-caught halibut was 459 lb (208.2 kg) in Dutch Harbor near Unalaska, Alaska, in 1996.

== Length and weight ==
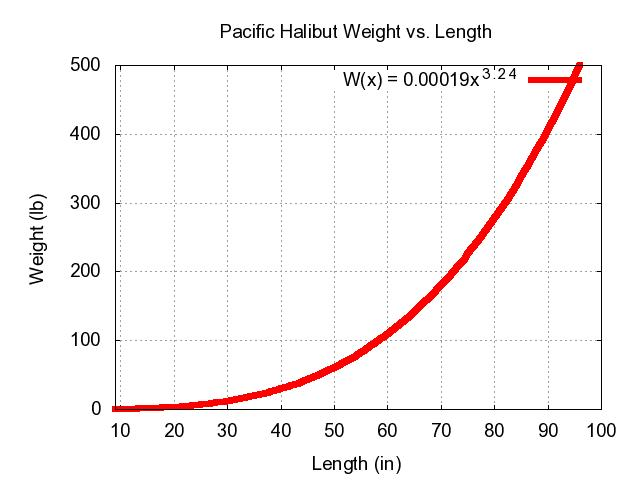

As Pacific halibut grow longer, they increase in weight, but the relationship between length and weight is not linear. The relationship between total length (L, in inches) and total weight (W, in pounds) for nearly all species of fish can be expressed by an equation of the form: $W = cL^b\!\,$

Invariably, b is close to 3.0 for all species, and c is a constant that varies between species. A weight-length relationship based on a least-squares fit to data published in 2003 by the International Pacific Halibut Commission (IPHC) suggests, for Pacific halibut, c = 0.00018872 and b = 3.24.

This relationship predicts a 20-inch (51 cm) Pacific halibut will weigh about 3.0 lb (1.4 kg), a 36-inch (91 cm) halibut will weigh about 20 lb (9.1 kg), and a 58-inch (150 cm) halibut will weigh about 100 lb (45 kg).

== Commercial fishing ==
Commercial halibut fishing probably began in 1888 when three sailing ships from New England fished off the coast of Washington. As the industry grew, company-owned steamers carrying several smaller dories, from which the fishing was actually conducted, dominated the halibut industry. Subsequently, smaller boats of schooner design from 60 to 100 ft (18.3 to 30.5 m) were used by fishermen. These boats carried crews of five to eight and were specifically designed for halibut fishing. Today, many types of boats are used in the halibut industry. Most of the old-style halibut schooners have been replaced by more versatile craft that may also be used in commercial salmon seine, troll, gill net, and crab fisheries.

Halibut gear consists of units of leaded ground line in lengths of 100 fathoms (600 ft; 183 m) referred to as "skates". Each skate has about 100 hooks attached to it. "Gangens", or the lines to which the hooks are attached, are either tied to or snapped onto the ground line. A "set" consists of one or more baited skates tied together and laid on the ocean bottom with anchors at each end. Each end has a float line with a buoy attached. Hooks are typically baited with frozen herring, octopus, or other fresh fish. Depending on the fishing ground, depth, time of year, and bait used, a set is pulled 2–20 hours after being fished. Longlines are normally pulled off the ocean floor by a hydraulic puller of some type. The halibut are cleaned soon after being boated and are kept on ice to retain freshness. Homer, Alaska, claims the title of "Halibut Capital of the World" because of the large volume of both sport and commercial halibut fishing in the area.

In 2018, the International Pacific Halibut Commission set the catch limit at 2,823 tonnes, of which 2,402 tonnes were for commercial fisheries and 421 tonnes were for recreational fisheries.

== Sport fishing ==
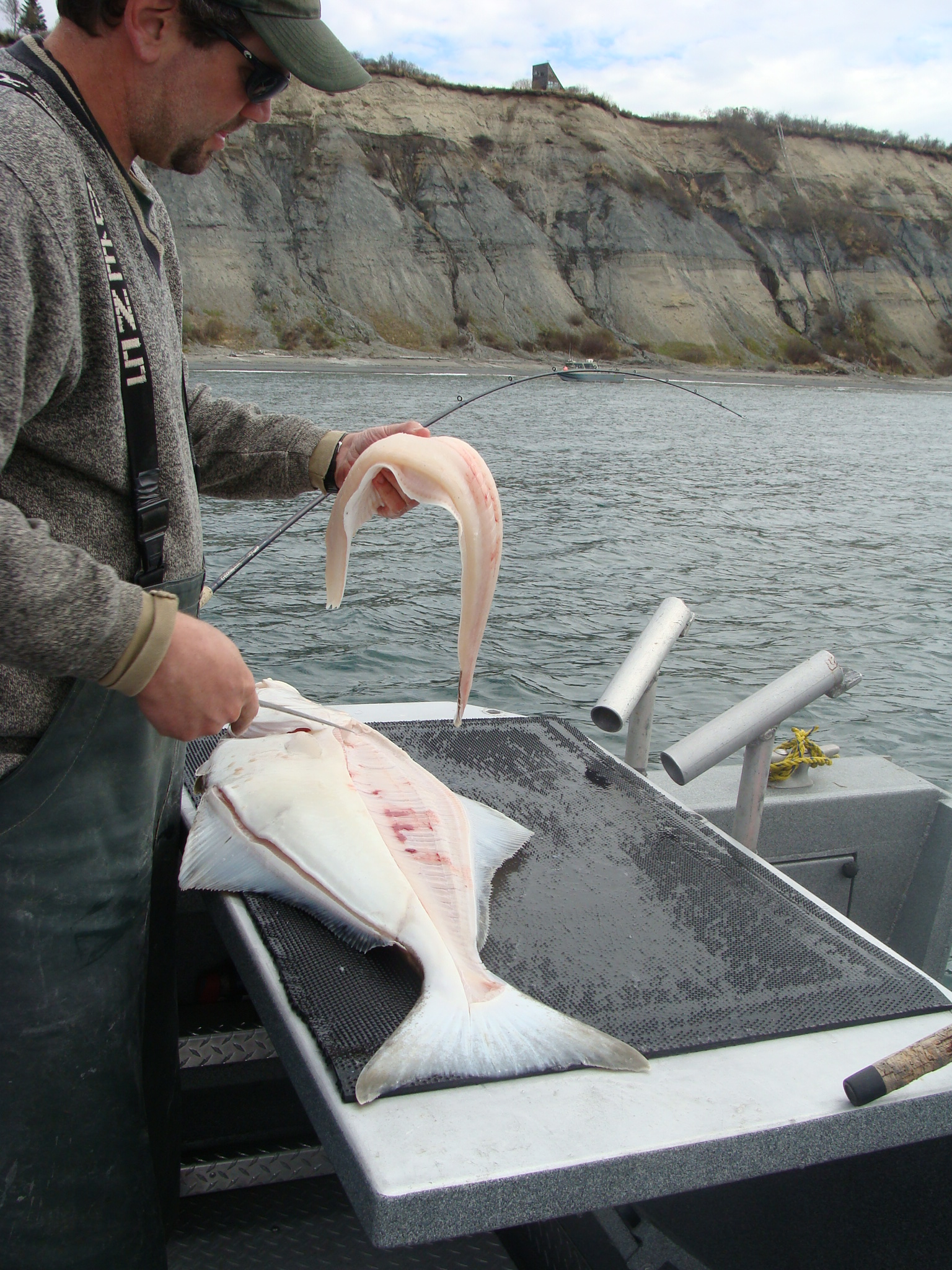
Filleting a 20-lb Pacific halibut

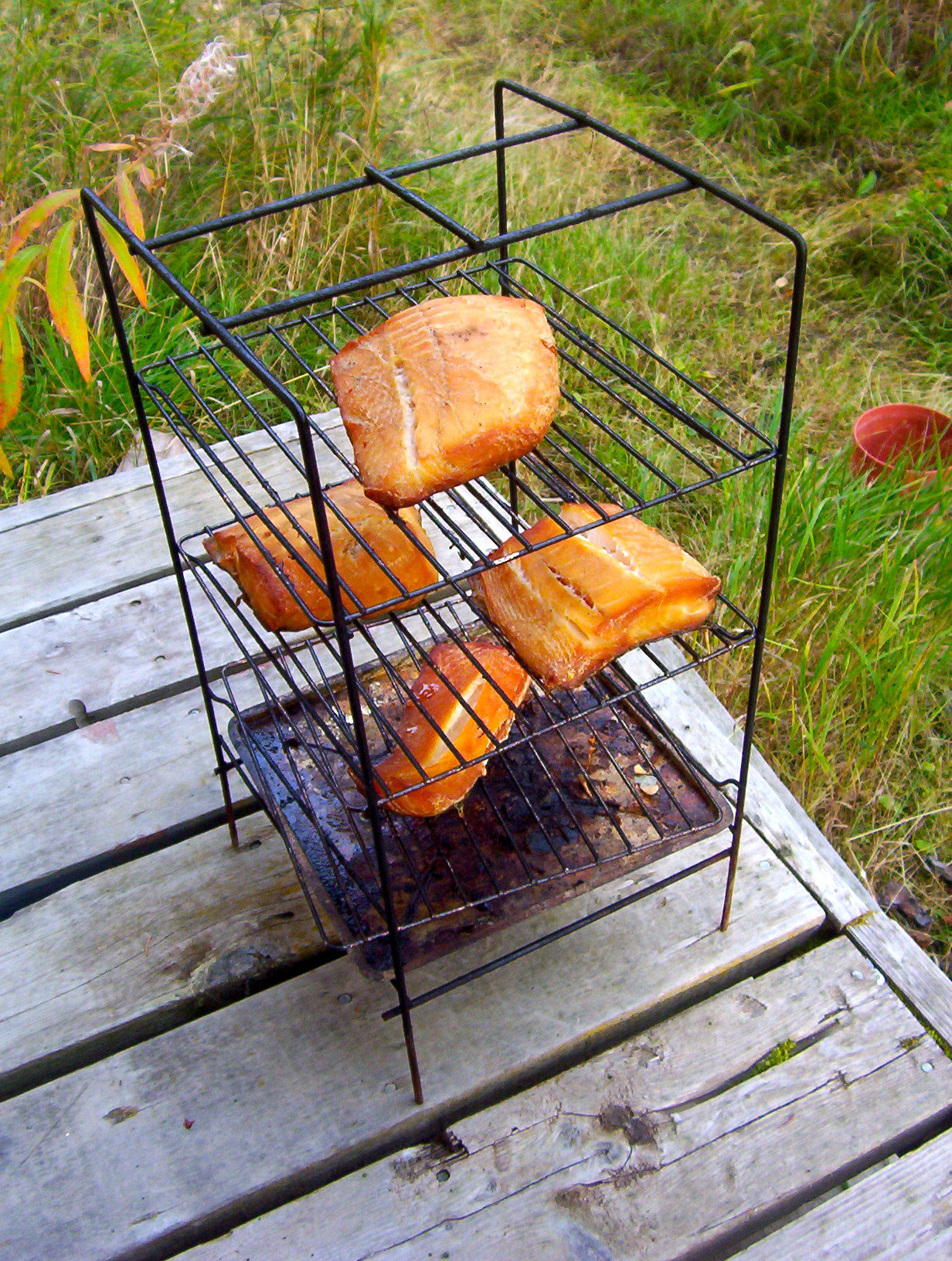
Smoked Pacific halibut on smoker racks

Sport fishing for halibut in Alaska is a very popular activity; it is a strong fighter and one of the world's largest bony fish with an impressive yield of firm, white flesh. Over 65% of the effort and harvest occurs in Cook Inlet, southeast Alaska, the Kodiak area, and near the mouth of Deep Creek in the Lower Cook Inlet.

Halibut taken by anglers are generally 15 to 20 lb (6.8 to 9.1 kg) in weight, but fish over 150 lb (68 kg) are regularly caught. The current Alaska state record for a sport-caught halibut is 459 lb (208 kg), and a fish must weigh at least 250 lb (113 kg) to qualify for the state's trophy fish program. Anglers use stout saltwater gear to harvest halibut. Most anglers prefer to fish with bait, especially herring, but also squid, octopus, cod pieces, or other small bottom fish. To get the bait down to the halibut, it is usually fished on a wire spreader or a sliding-sinker rig with sinker size 4 oz (113 g) to 4 lb (1.81 kg), depending on such factors as depth and current.

Halibut, along with salmon, provide sustenance for several Pacific Coast native groups. Many of these groups smoke and dry the halibut for winter use. Sportsmen's effort and interest in catching these fish is increasing each year. In southeast Alaska, halibut are second only to king salmon in sport-angler preference. Fishing for Pacific halibut is regulated by the International Pacific Halibut Commission. Members from the United States and Canada meet yearly to review research, check the progress of the commercial fishery, and make regulations for the next fishing season. The management of halibut fishing by this commission is intended to allow a sustainable yield.
