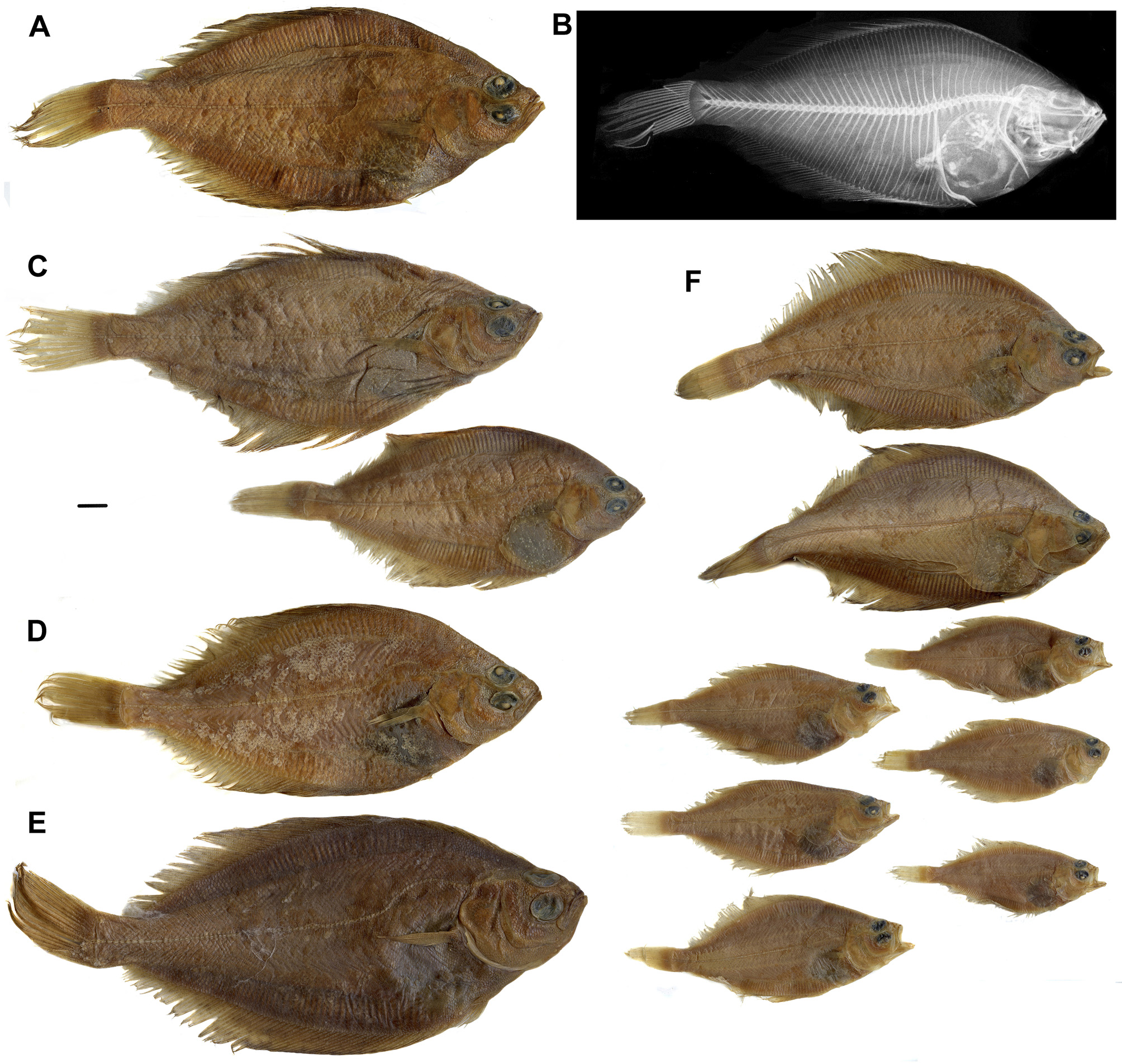

Scientific classification
- Kingdom: Animalia
- Phylum: Chordata
- Class: Actinopterygii
- Order: Carangiformes
- Suborder: Pleuronectoidei
- Family: Pleuronectidae
- Subfamily: Pleuronectinae
- Genus: Acanthopsetta; P. J. Schmidt, 1904
- Species: A. nadeshnyi

Binomial name
- Acanthopsetta nadeshnyi P. J. Schmidt, 1904

= Scale-eye plaice =

Species of fish

The scale-eye plaice (Acanthopsetta nadeshnyi) is a species of flatfish in the family Pleuronectidae. It is a demersal fish that lives at depths from between 18 metres (59 ft) to 900 metres (3,000 ft). It can reach 46 centimetres (18 in) in length and can weigh up to 1.2 kilograms (2.6 lb). Its native habitat is the northern Pacific, primarily from the Sea of Okhotsk to Japan and Korea, though it is also found in the Bering Sea.
