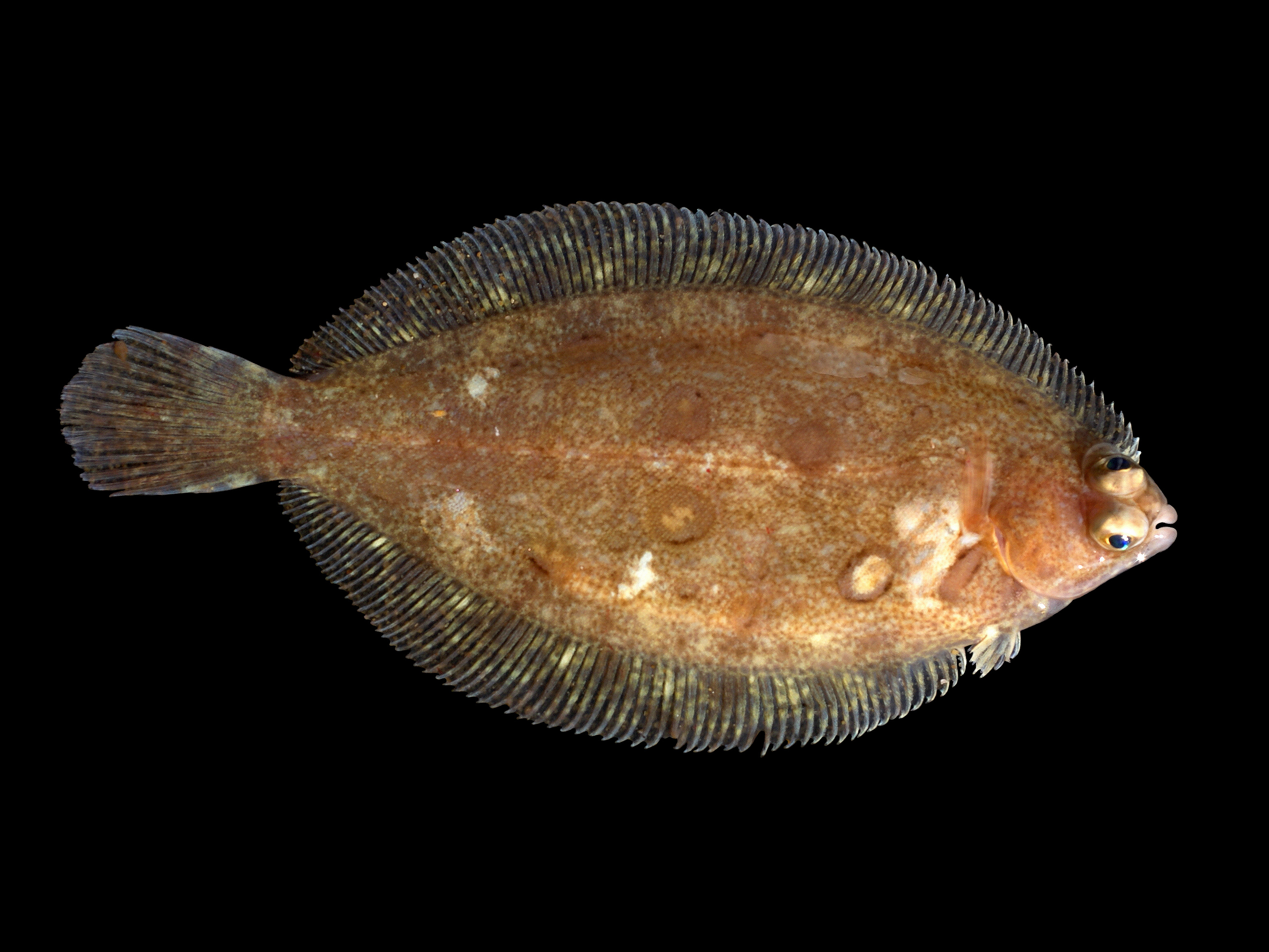

Conservation status
- Least Concern (IUCN 3.1)

Scientific classification
- Kingdom: Animalia
- Phylum: Chordata
- Class: Actinopterygii
- Division: Teleostei
- Order: Carangiformes
- Suborder: Pleuronectoidei
- Family: Pleuronectidae
- Genus: Microstomus
- Species: M. kitt

Binomial name
- Microstomus kitt (Walbaum, 1792)
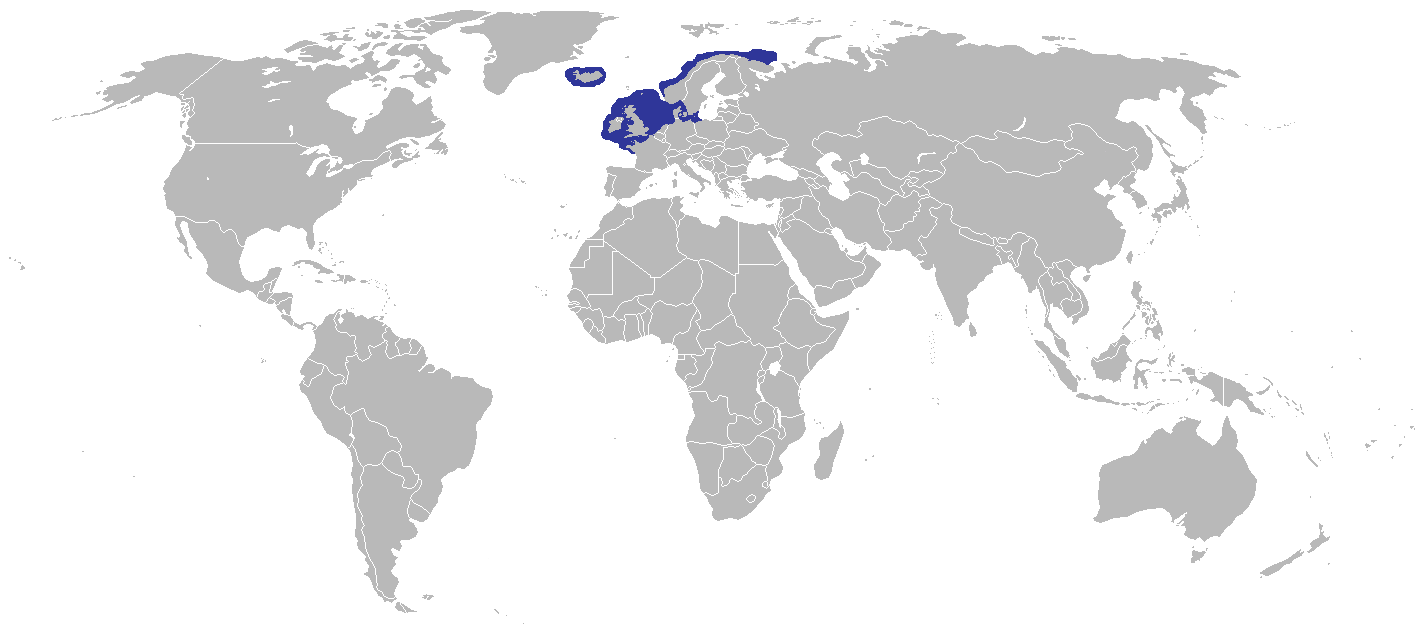
- Range of the lemon sole

Synonyms
- Pleuronectes kitt Walbaum, 1792; Pleuronectes microcephalus Donovan, 1803; Pleuronectes laevis Shaw, 1803; Platessa pola Cuvier, 1829; Microstomus latidens Gottsche, 1835; Pleuronectes gilli Steindachner, 1868

= Lemon sole =

Species of fish

The lemon sole (Microstomus kitt) is a flatfish of the family Pleuronectidae. It is native to shallow seas around Northern Europe, where it lives on stony bottoms down to depths of about 1,400 metres (4,600 ft). It grows up to 65 centimetres (26 in) in length and reaches about 3 kilograms (6.6 lb) in weight.

It is a popular food fish.

== Identification ==
The lemon sole is a right-eyed flatfish with a small head and mouth and smooth, slimy skin. The upper surface is reddish brown in colour, mottled with pink and orange and flecks of yellow and green, and a prominent orange patch is typically found behind the pectoral fin, around which the lateral line also curves. The underside of the fish is white. Adults can reach lengths of up to 65 centimetres (26 in), but most measure around 20–30 centimetres (8–12 in).

== Origin of the name ==
The fish is not a true sole, nor does it have the taste of lemon. The English name probably comes from the French name: limande or sole limande. The French term limande may come from the French word lime, meaning "file" (a tool used to smooth metal, wood, etc.), possibly referring to the texture of the fish's skin. Some other authors suggest that "limande" may also come from the French word limon (which means "silt").

== Fishing ==
In 2007 the European Union fishing quota, or Total Allowable Catch (TAC), for lemon sole (and witch) was 6,175 tonnes, of which 3,716 tonnes were caught, mostly by UK fishermen. The quota for both 2008 and 2009 was 6,793 tonnes.

The Marine Conservation Society rates lemon sole at 3 or 4 on its sustainability scale (where 1 is best and 5 is worst) depending on how and where it is caught.

== See also ==
Several other species of flatfish are known as lemon soles:

- English sole, Parophrys vetulus
- Southern lemon sole, Pelotretis flavilatus
- Winter flounder, Pseudopleuronectes americanus
