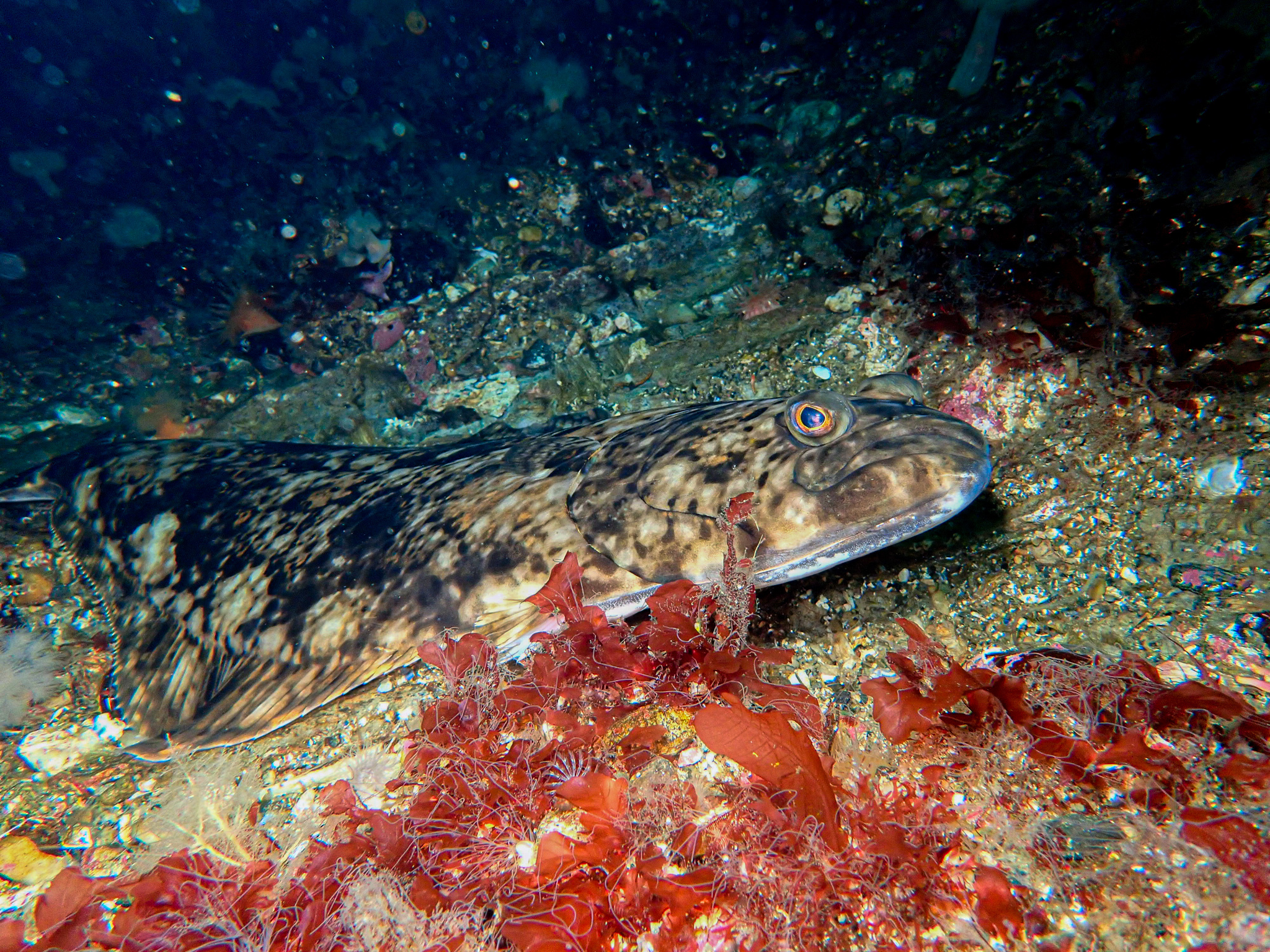

Conservation status
- Near Threatened (IUCN 3.1)

Scientific classification
- Kingdom: Animalia
- Phylum: Chordata
- Class: Actinopterygii
- Division: Teleostei
- Order: Carangiformes
- Suborder: Pleuronectoidei
- Family: Pleuronectidae
- Genus: Hippoglossus
- Species: H. hippoglossus

Binomial name
- Hippoglossus hippoglossus (Linnaeus, 1758)

Synonyms
- Pleuronectes hippoglossus Linnaeus, 1758; Hippoglossus vulgaris Fleming, 1828; Hippoglossus gigas Swainson, 1839; Hippoglossus americanus Gill, 1864; Hippoglossus linnei Malm, 1877; Hippoglossus maximus Gottsche, 1965

= Atlantic halibut =

Species of fish

The Atlantic halibut (Hippoglossus hippoglossus) is a flatfish of the family Pleuronectidae. They are demersal fish living on or near sand, gravel or clay bottoms at depths of between 50 and 2,000 m (200 and 6,600 ft). The halibut is among the largest teleost (bony) fish in the world, and is a threatened species owing to a slow rate of growth and overfishing. Halibut are strong swimmers and are able to migrate long distances. Halibut size is not age-specific, but rather tends to follow a cycle related to halibut (and therefore food) abundance.

The native habitat of the Atlantic halibut is the temperate and arctic waters of the northern Atlantic, from Labrador and Greenland to Iceland, the Barents Sea and as far south as the Bay of Biscay and Virginia. It is the largest flatfish in the world, reaching lengths of up to 4.7 m (15 ft) and weights of 320 kg (710 lb). Its lifespan can reach 50 years.

Age can be estimated by counting the rings laid down inside the otolith – a bony structure found inside the inner ear of the fish.

== Description ==
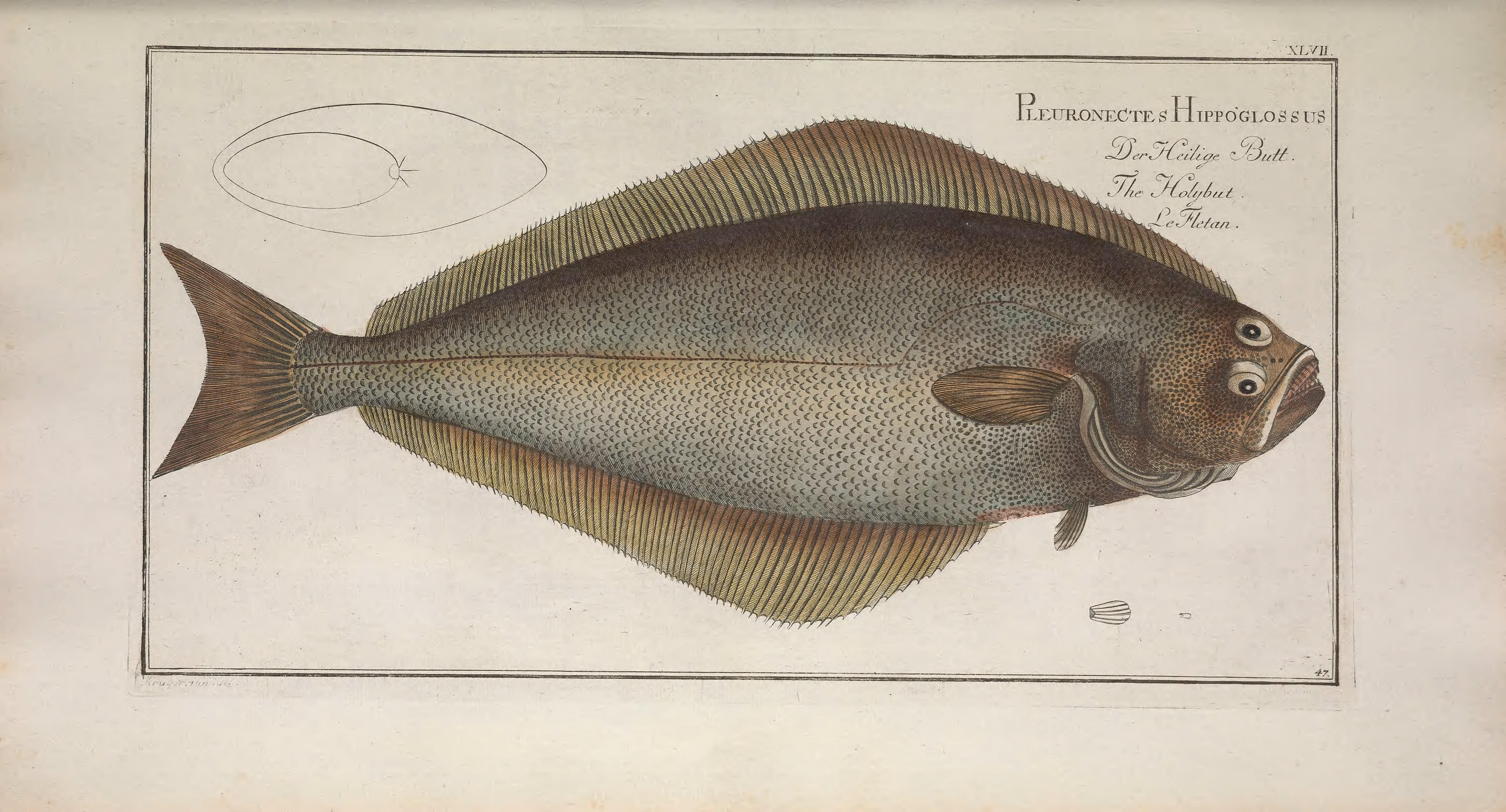
Illustration of an Atlantic halibut

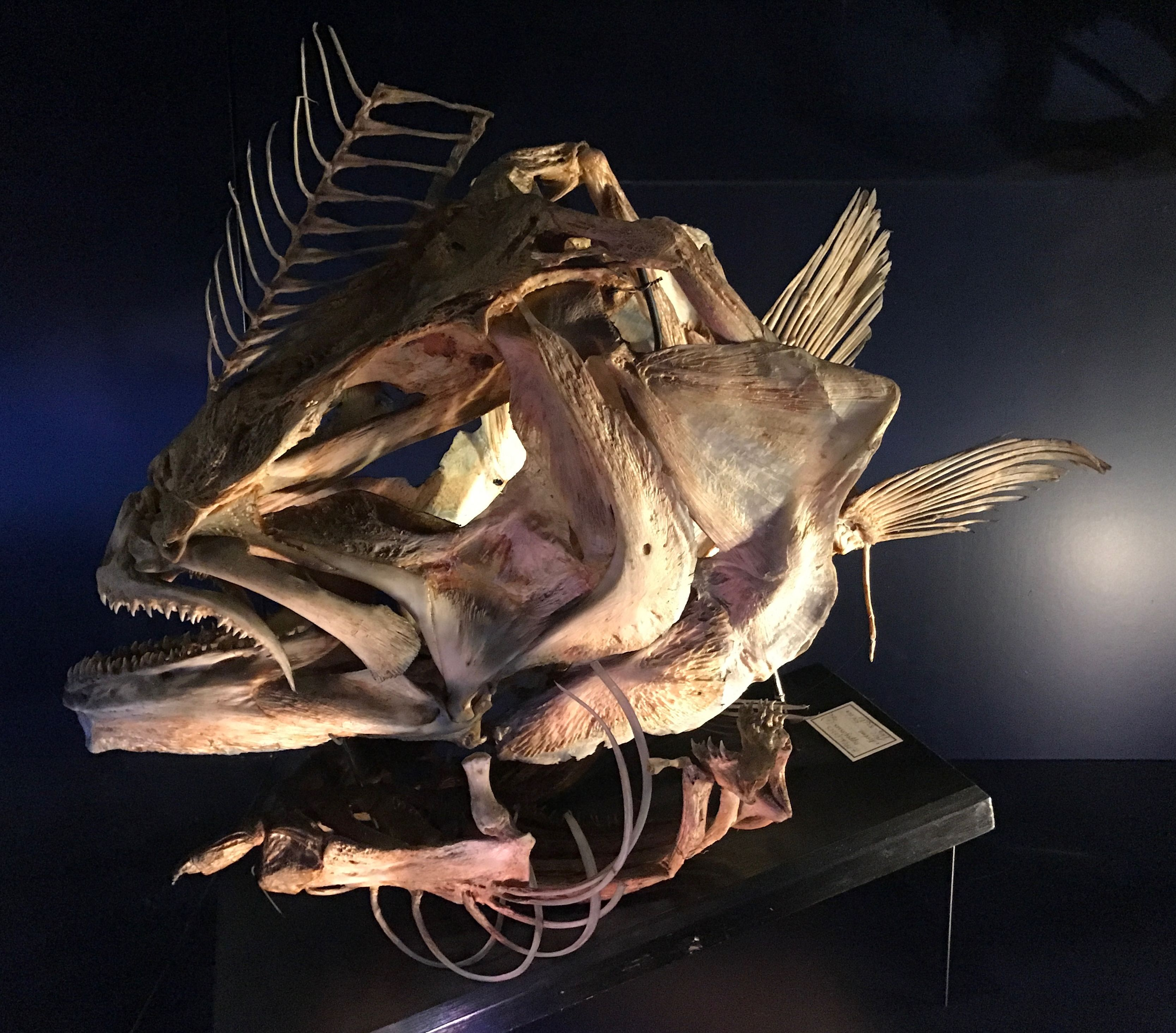
The skeleton of Atlantic halibut in the Museum of Natural History in Vienna

The Atlantic halibut is a right-eyed flounder. It is flattened sideways and habitually lies on the left side of its body with both eyes migrating to the right side of its head during development. When the larvae are born, they start in the upright position like most other fish, having one eye on each side of the head. Once the larvae reach one inch in length, the left eye moves over the snout to the right side of the head. At the same time, the coloring on the left side begins to fade to white while the upper side of the fish is a uniformly dark chocolate, olive or slate color, and can be almost black. The end of the caudal fin is concave. Young fish are paler with more mottled coloration. Male adults average about 10 to 15 kilograms (25–30 lb) but can range to upwards of 25 kg (60 lb), rarely reaching 45 kg (100 lb). Females can get as large as 250 kg (600 lb).

== Biology ==
Atlantic Halibut have a relatively slow growth rate and late onset of sexual maturity, with males attaining maturity at seven to eight years old, females at 10 to 11 years, and individuals averagely live around 25 to 30 years old. The oldest to have been caught was 50 years old. The Atlantic Halibut is a batch spawner where females lay from a few thousand to four million eggs (depending on the size and age of the fish, older females tend to lay only two million in one spawning period). Spawning occurs between December and April near the bottom of the ocean between 5 and 7 °C (41 and 45 °F). The egg size is around 3.0–3.8 mm and the larvae at time of hatching is 6.5 mm. Growth weight is dependent on the density, competition, and availability of food.

== Habitat ==
This marine fish usually lives on the ocean floor at depths between 50 and 2,000 m (200 and 6,600 ft), but it occasionally comes closer to the surface. The larvae are pelagic, drifting relatively helplessly, but at around 4 cm, they migrate to the bottom. Young between the ages of two and four years live close to the shore, moving into deeper waters as they grow older.

== Geographic distribution ==
Atlantic halibut are found in both the eastern and western portions of the North Atlantic. In the western Atlantic, they are found from southwestern Greenland and Labrador, Canada, to Virginia in the United States. They are found in the eastern Atlantic around Iceland, the United Kingdom, Ireland and northern Europe to Russia. A map of the Atlantic Halibut's geographic distribution can be found on the Official Website of Massachusetts Division of Marine Fisheries.

This demersal fish is found ranging from the latitude and longitude coordinates: 79°N - 36°N, 77°W - 55°E.

== Role in ecosystem ==
The Atlantic halibut occupies a relatively high trophic level in the food chain.

== Diet ==
The diet of the Atlantic halibut consists mainly of other fish, for example cod, haddock, herring, pogge, sand eels and capelin, but it will also eat cephalopods, large crustaceans and other benthos organisms.

During the first year of their life, halibut mostly feed on plankton. From the age of one year, they feed on krill and small fish until they are around three years old. As the halibut grows, the diet mostly consists of other fish including smaller halibut.

== Predators ==
Atlantic halibut are eaten by seals, and are a staple food of the Greenland shark. Killer whales are also natural predators of the halibut. Humans also consume halibut.

== Commercial fishing of wild Atlantic halibut ==
The wild Atlantic halibut was formerly a very important food fish, but because of its slow rate of population growth, it is unable to recover quickly from overfishing, and the fishery has largely collapsed. Consequently, wild fish labelled as "halibut" are usually one of the other large flatfishes, including Pacific halibut, Hippoglossus stenolepis.

The most popular way to catch the Atlantic halibut is to use circle hooks that are baited with herring or other similar fish, fished from the bottom with cannonball weights of up to 36 ounces on a slider.

The survival rate of caught and released halibut is 95 percent owing to the lack of having a swim bladder and not severely suffering from changes in water pressure (as long as the captured halibut is in excellent condition).

== Farming ==
Because of its popularity as a food fish, Atlantic halibut has attracted investment in fish farming. As of 2006, five countries—Canada, Norway, the UK, Iceland and Chile—were engaged in some form of Atlantic halibut aquaculture production.

== Conservation status ==
In 1996, the IUCN rated it as Endangered and placed it on its Red List.

The Atlantic halibut is a US National Marine Fisheries Service Species of Concern, one of those species about which the U.S. Government's National Oceanic and Atmospheric Administration has some concerns regarding status and threats, but for which insufficient information is available to indicate a need to list the species under the U.S. Endangered Species Act (ESA). The American Fisheries Society has classified the species as "Vulnerable". In 2010, Greenpeace International added the Atlantic halibut to its seafood red list of "fish that are commonly sold in supermarkets around the world, and which have a very high risk of being sourced from unsustainable fisheries."

The Atlantic halibut has been on the endangered species list since 1996 because of overfishing. It became commercially important during the 19th century because of great demand for its meat, as halibut is one of the largest flatfishes and easy to capture.
