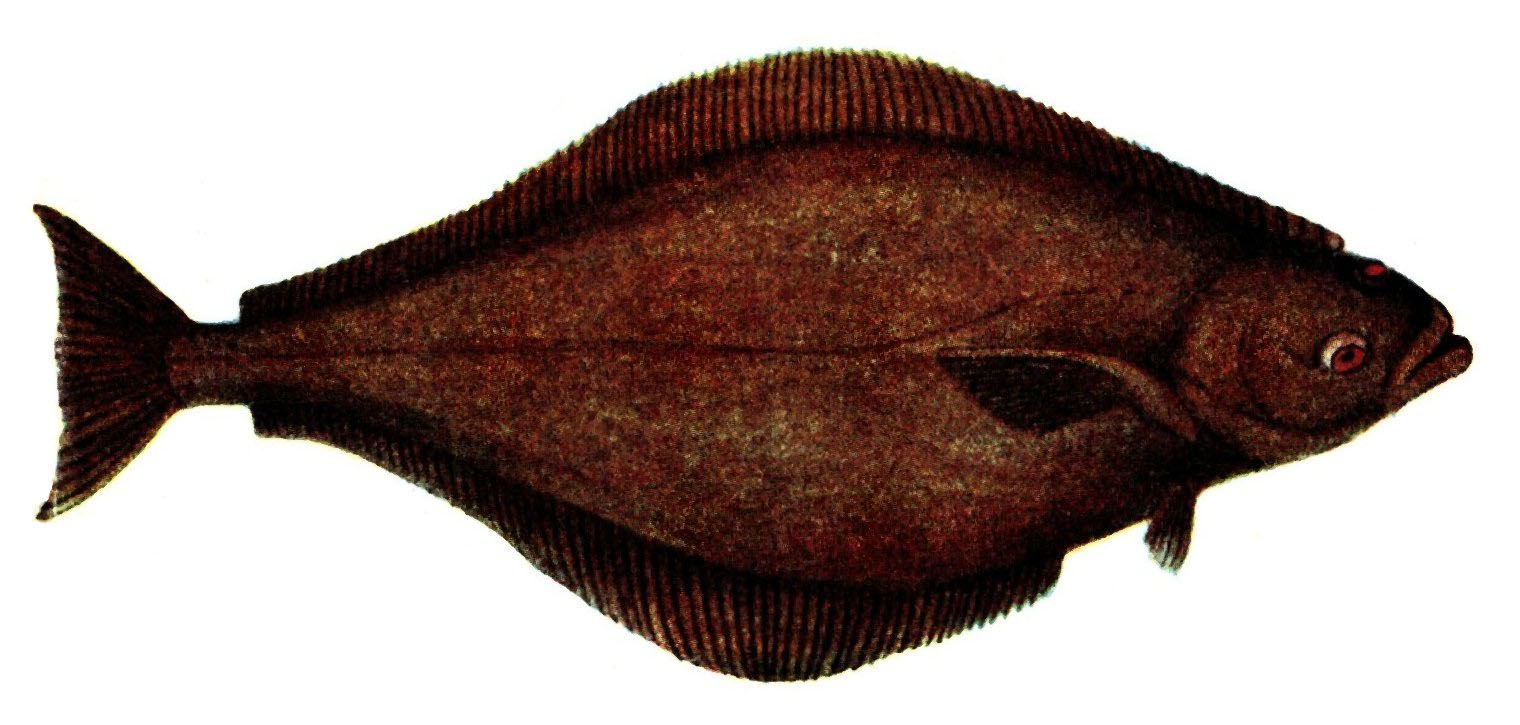
- Atlantic halibut (H. hippoglossus)

Scientific classification
- Kingdom: Animalia
- Phylum: Chordata
- Class: Actinopterygii
- Order: Carangiformes
- Suborder: Pleuronectoidei
- Family: Pleuronectidae
- Subfamily: Hippoglossinae
- Genus: Hippoglossus; G. Cuvier, 1816

Type species
- Pleuronectes hippoglossus Linnaeus, 1758

= Hippoglossus =

Hippoglossus Temporal range: Middle Miocene–present

Genus of fishes

Hippoglossus is a genus of very large righteye flounders. It comprises two species of halibut, with one species native to the northern Atlantic Ocean and the other species native to the northern Pacific Ocean.

== Etymology ==
The word hippoglossus is derived from the Greek ἵππος (hippos), meaning "horse", and γλῶσσα (glōssa), meaning "tongue" - a reference to the shape of the fish.

== Species ==
There are two species in this genus:

Image	Scientific name	Distribution
	Hippoglossus hippoglossus (Linnaeus, 1758) (Atlantic halibut)	northern Atlantic, from Labrador and Greenland to Iceland, the Barents Sea and as far south as the Bay of Biscay and Virginia
	Hippoglossus stenolepis P. J. Schmidt, 1904 (Pacific halibut)	Gulf of Alaska and the Bering Sea, off the west coast of Canada, coastal Washington, Oregon, and California

Fossil remains of an indeterminate Hippoglossus are known from the Middle Miocene-aged Agnevo Formation of Sakhalin, Russia.
