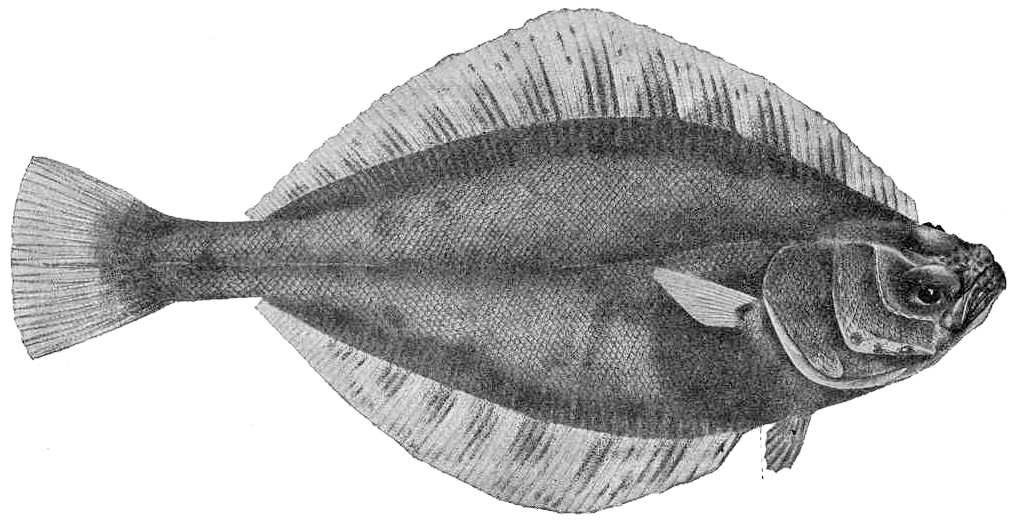
- Cleisthenes pinetorum

Scientific classification
- Kingdom: Animalia
- Phylum: Chordata
- Class: Actinopterygii
- Order: Carangiformes
- Suborder: Pleuronectoidei
- Family: Pleuronectidae
- Subfamily: Pleuronectinae
- Genus: Cleisthenes; Jordan & Starks, 1904

Type species
- Cleisthenes pinetorum Jordan & Starks 1904

Synonyms
- Protopsetta Schmidt, 1904

= Cleisthenes (fish) =

Genus of fishes

Cleisthenes is a genus of righteye flounders native to the northwest Pacific Ocean.

== Nomenclature ==
Both species in the genus are commonly known as Sôhachi in Japan.

== Etymology ==
The genus is named after the Athenian noble and democrat Cleisthenes.

== Species ==
There are currently two recognized species in this genus:

- Cleisthenes herzensteini (Schmidt, 1904)
- Cleisthenes pinetorum Jordan & Starks, 1904
