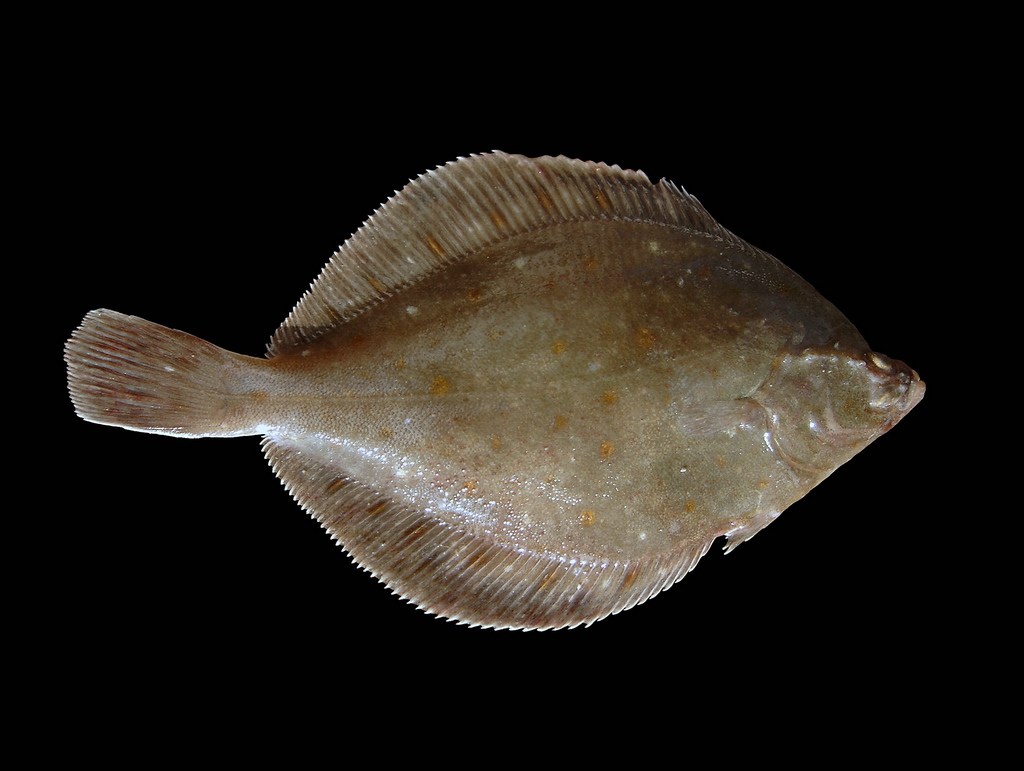
- European plaice, Pleuronectes platessa

Scientific classification
- Kingdom: Animalia
- Phylum: Chordata
- Class: Actinopterygii
- Order: Carangiformes
- Suborder: Pleuronectoidei
- Family: Pleuronectidae; Rafinesque, 1815

Subfamilies and genera
- Genus †Chibapsetta; Genus †Evesthes; Genus †Oligopleuronectes; Genus †Saitamapsetta; Subfamily Atheresthinae Genus Atheresthes Subfamily Hippoglossinae Genus Clidoderma Genus Eopsetta Genus Hippoglossus Genus Lyopsetta Genus Reinhardtius Genus Verasper Subfamily Microstominae Genus Glyptocephalus Genus Microstomus Subfamily Pleuronectinae Genus Acanthopsetta Genus Cleisthenes Genus Dexistes Genus Hippoglossoides Genus Isopsetta Genus Lepidopsetta Genus Limanda Genus Liopsetta Genus Myzopsetta Genus Parophrys Genus Platichthys Genus Pleuronectes Genus Pleuronichthys Genus Psettichthys Genus †Psettoraptor Genus Pseudopleuronectes

= Pleuronectidae =

Pleuronectidae Temporal range: Early Oligocene–present

Family of fishes

Pleuronectidae, also known as righteye flounders, are a family of flounders. They are called "righteye flounders" because most species lie on the sea bottom on their left sides, with both eyes on their right sides. The Paralichthyidae are the opposite, with their eyes on the left side. A small number of species in Pleuronectidae can also have their eyes on the left side, notably the members of the genus Platichthys.

Their dorsal and anal fins are long and continuous, with the dorsal fin extending forward onto the head. Females lay eggs that float in mid-water until the larvae develop, and they sink to the bottom.

They are found on the bottoms of oceans around the world, with some species, such as the Atlantic halibut, Hippoglossus hippoglossus, being found down to 2,000 m (6,560 ft). The smaller species eat sea-floor invertebrates such as polychaetes and crustaceans, but the larger righteye flounders, such as H. hippoglossus, which grows up to 4.7 m (15 ft) in length, feed on other fishes and cephalopods, as well.

They include many important commercially fished species, including not only the various fish called flounders, but also the European plaice, the halibuts, the lemon sole, the common dab, the Pacific Dover sole, and the flukes.

The name of the family is derived from the Greek πλευρά (pleura), meaning "rib" or "side", and νηκτόν (nekton), meaning "swimming".

== Classification ==
The family has four subfamilies:

- Atheresthinae – one genus with 2 species
- Hippoglossinae – 9 extant species in seven genera
- Microstominae – 9 species in two genera
- Pleuronectinae – 36 species in 14 genera

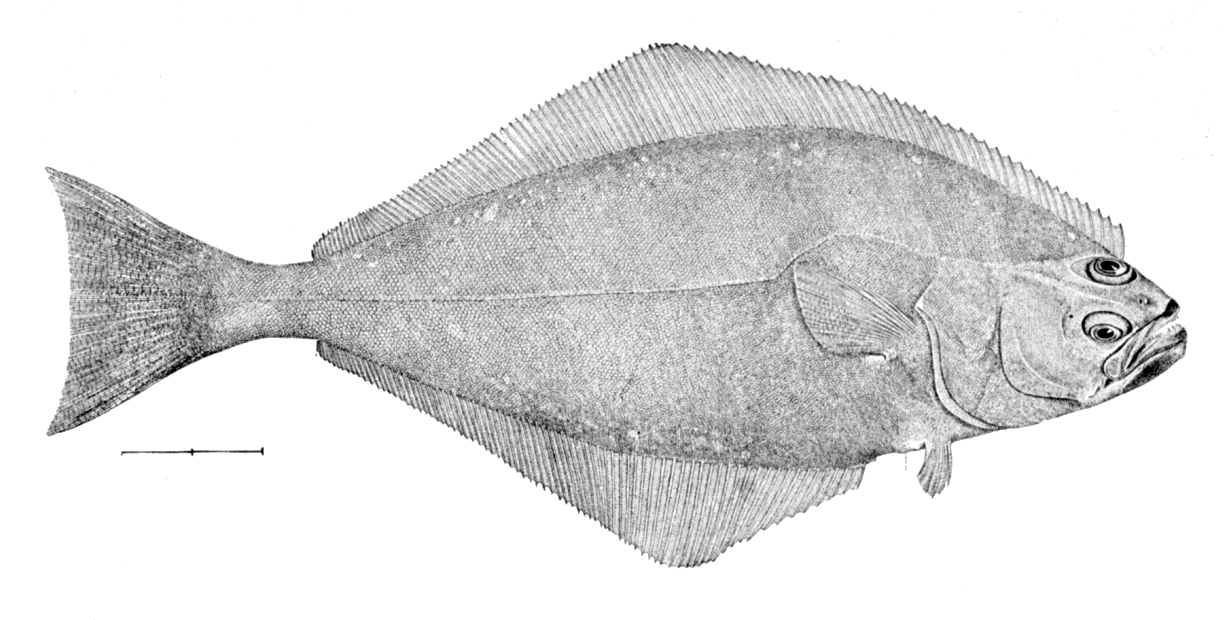
Atlantic halibut, Hippoglossus hippoglossus

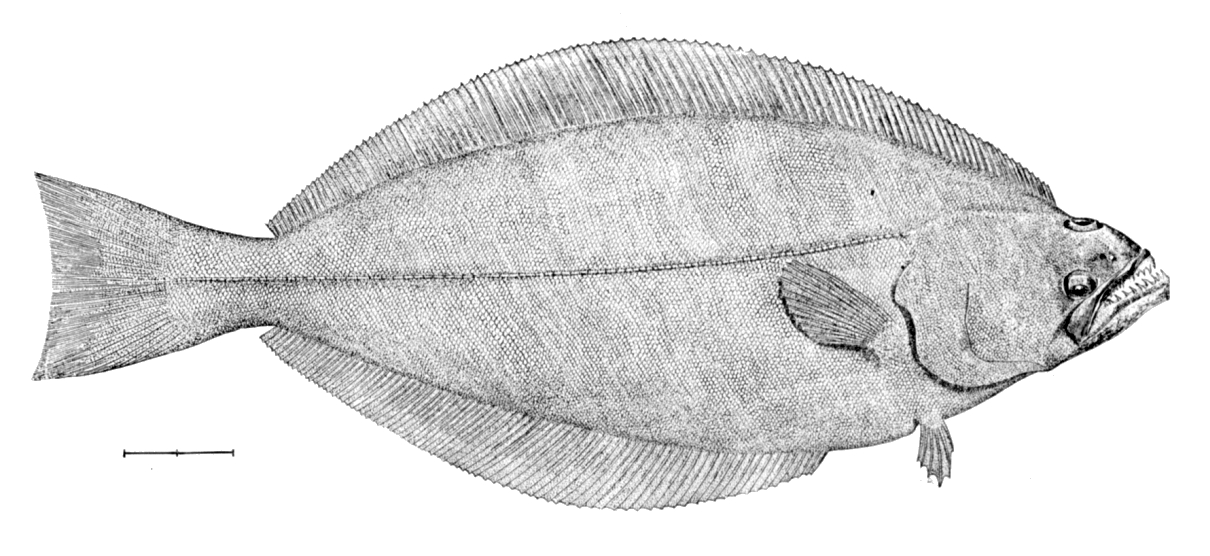
Greenland halibut, Reinhardtius hippoglossoides

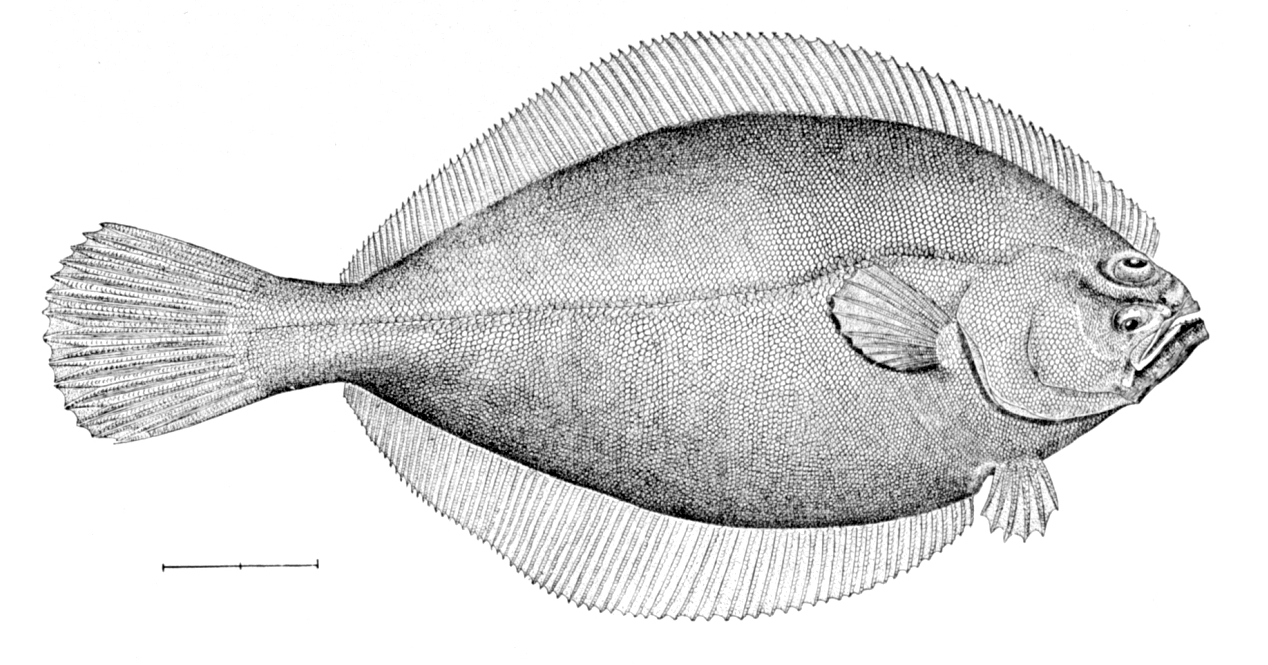
American plaice, H. platessoides

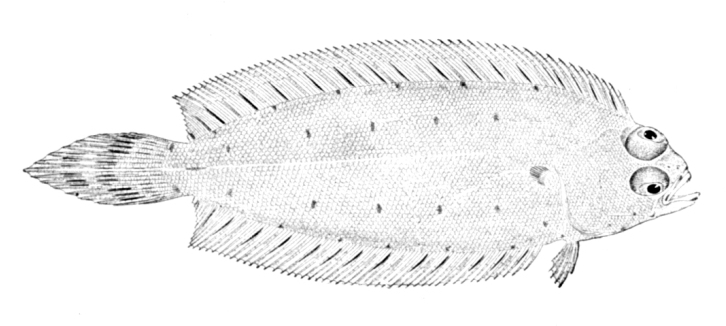
Witch, Glyptocephalus cynoglossus

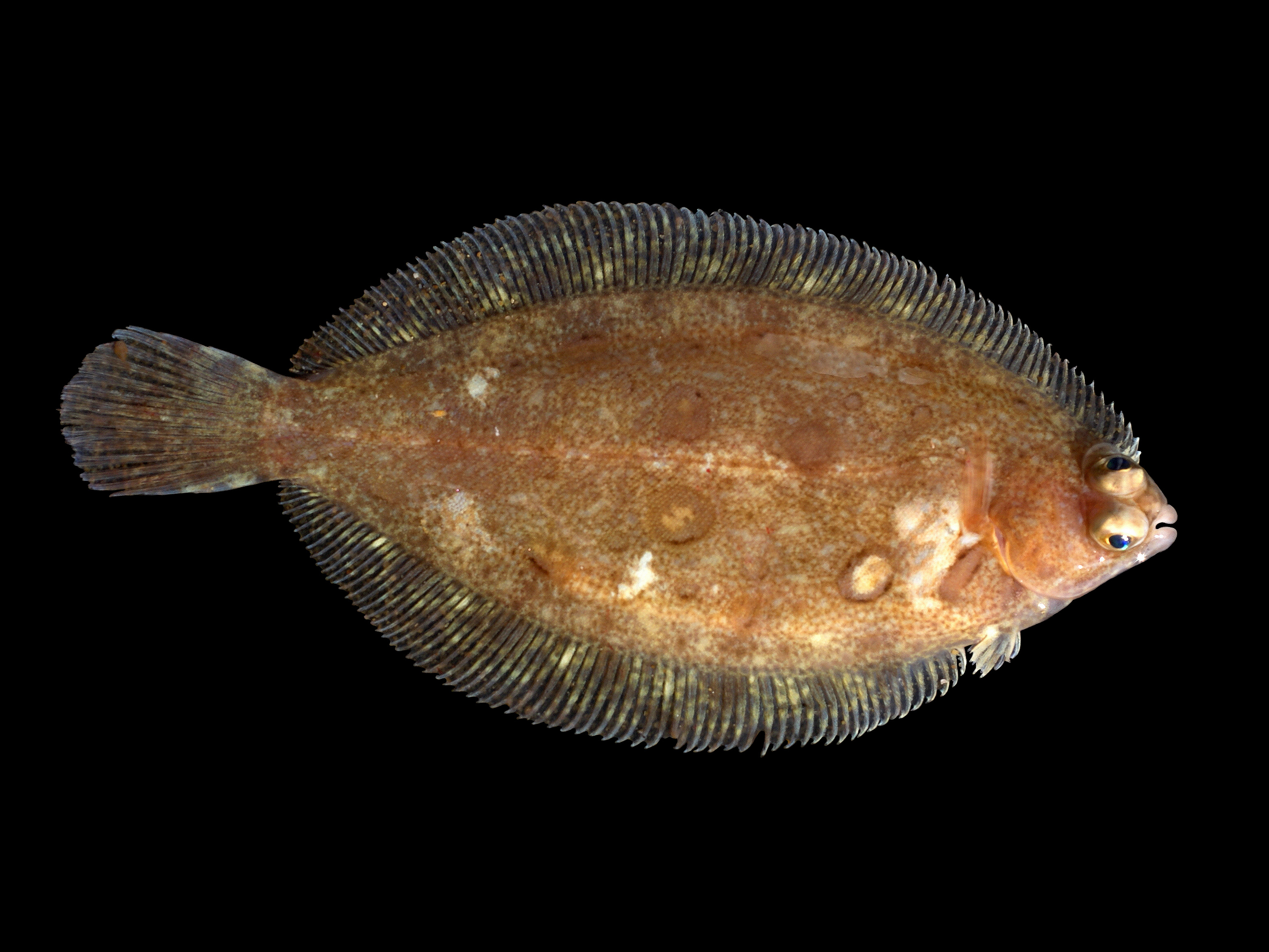
Lemon sole, Microstomus kitt

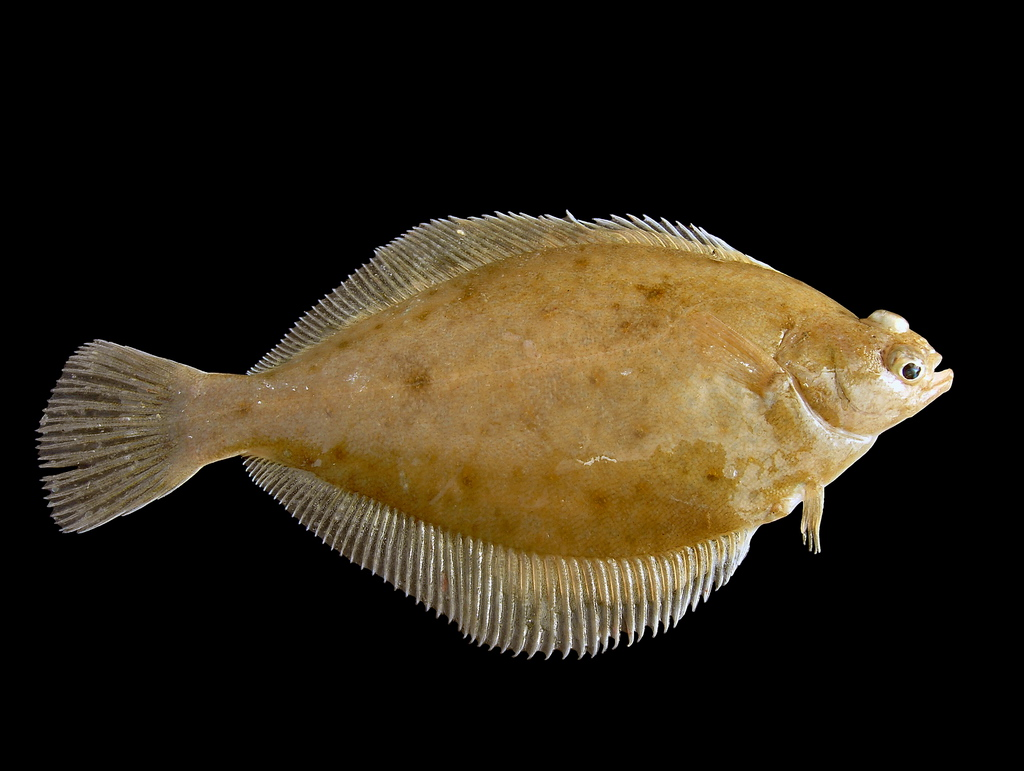
Common dab, Limanda limanda

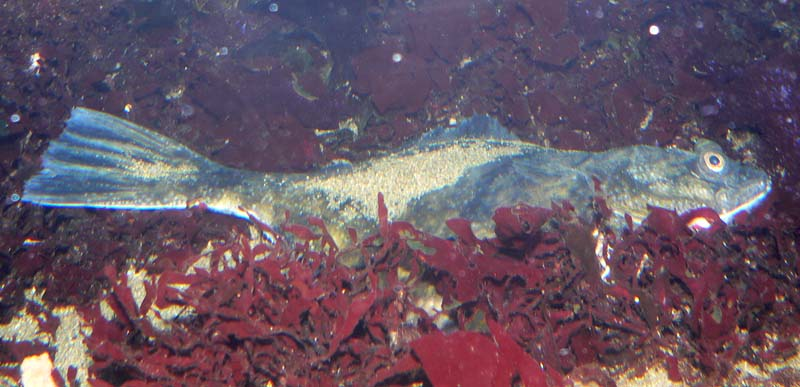
English sole, Parophrys vetulus

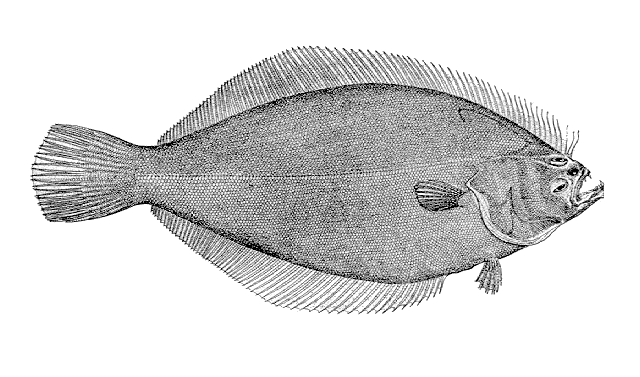
Pacific sand sole, Psettichthys melanostictus

== See also ==
- Bothidae, the lefteye family of flounders
