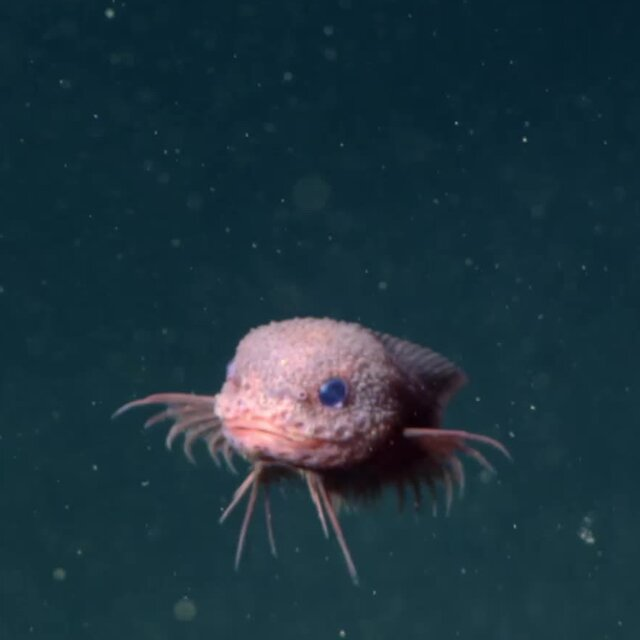

Scientific classification
- Kingdom: Animalia
- Phylum: Chordata
- Class: Actinopterygii
- Division: Teleostei
- Order: Perciformes
- Suborder: Cottoidei
- Family: Liparidae
- Genus: Careproctus
- Species: C. colliculi

Binomial name
- Careproctus colliculi Gerringer, 2025

= Careproctus colliculi =

Species of fish

Careproctus colliculi, or bumpy snailfish, is a species of Liparidae (snailfish) found in the eastern Pacific Ocean.

== Description ==
The fish, which has been referred to as the "bumpy snailfish", is described as a pink-colored snailfish with a bumpy skin texture. It had twenty-two pectoral fins, and eight fins which were caudal. The study noted that the fish showed genetic similarities to Osteodiscus cascadiae.

The fish was found nearly 11,000 feet below the ocean in Monterey Canyon. It was discovered by the Monterey Bay Aquarium Research Institute's underwater vehicle Doc Ricketts. The institute also discovered two other species, Careproctus yanceyi and Paraliparis em.
