= P. australiensis =

P. australiensis may refer to:

- Paraliparis australiensis, the Australian snailfish, a species of snailfish
- Paraplatyarthrus australiensis, a species of woodlouse
- Paratya australiensis, the Australian glass shrimp, a species of true shrimp
- Pavetta australiensis, the butterfly bush, a species of flowering plant in the family Rubiaceae
- Piptoporus australiensis, curry punk, a polyporous bracket fungi
- Pleotrichiella australiensis, a species of fungi in the class Dothideomycetes
- Podochilus australiensis, the native stream orchid, a species of epiphytic or lithophytic orchid
- Pseudoamauroascus australiensis, a genus of fungi in the family Onygenaceae
- Pseudotyrannochthonius australiensis, a species of pseudoscorpion in the family Pseudotyrannochthoniidae
