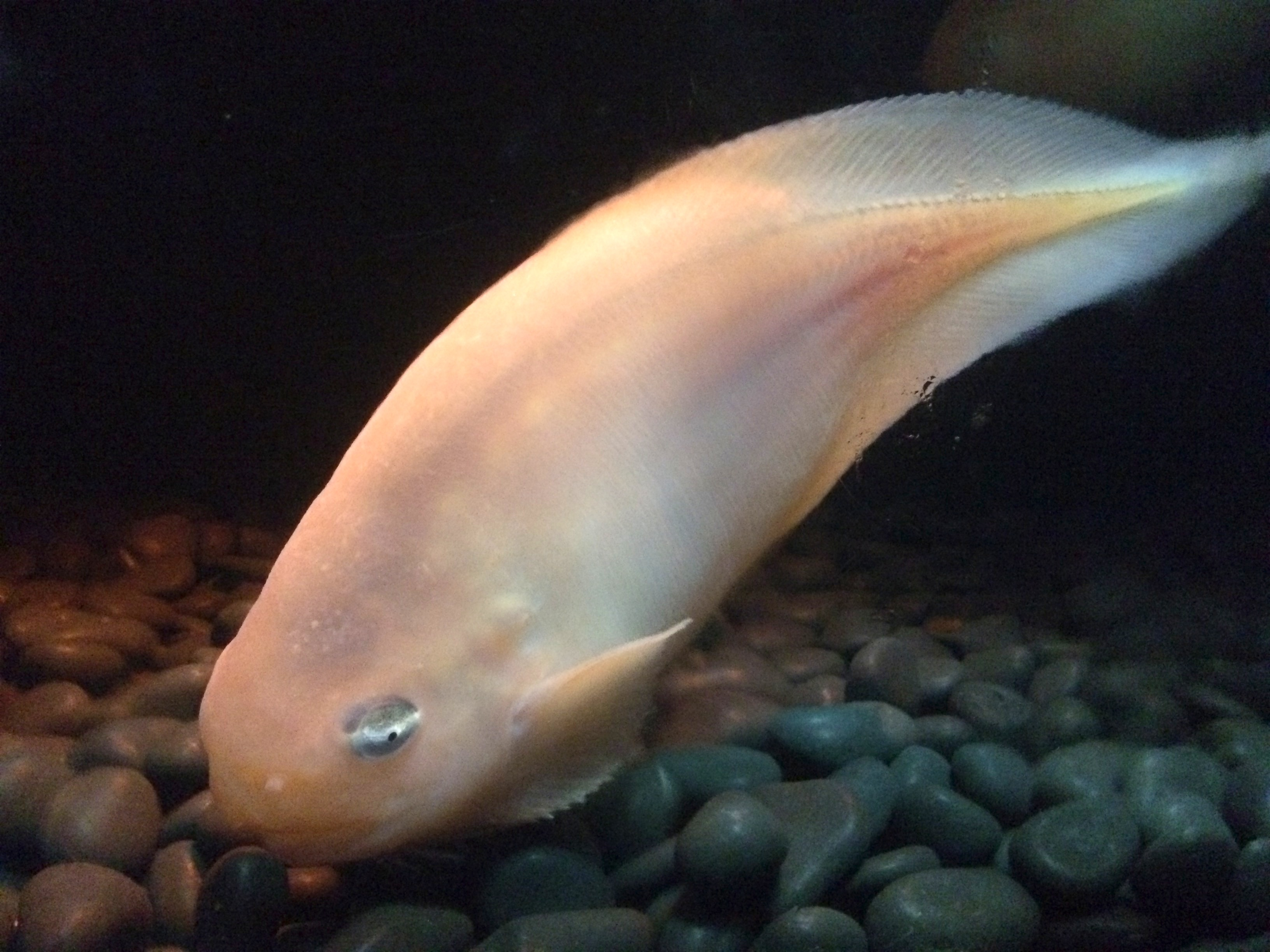
- Careproctus rastrinus at Numazu Deepblue Aquarium, Japan
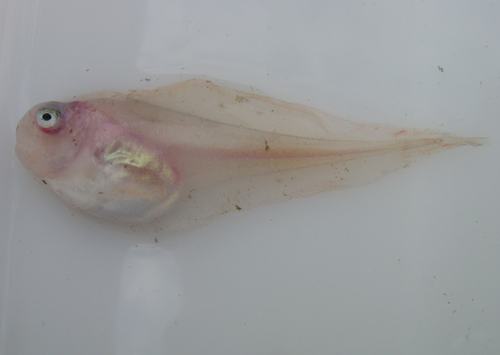
- Unidentified Careproctus from the Beaufort Sea

Scientific classification
- Kingdom: Animalia
- Phylum: Chordata
- Class: Actinopterygii
- Order: Perciformes
- Suborder: Cottoidei
- Family: Liparidae
- Genus: Careproctus; Krøyer, 1862

Type species
- Liparis reinhardti Krøyer, 1862

Synonyms
- Enantioliparis Vaillant, 1888; Allochir Jordan & Evermann, 1896; Allinectes Jordan & Evermann, 1898; Allurus Jordan & Evermann, 1896; Caremitra Jordan & Evermann, 1896; Careproctula Andriashev, 2003; Enantioliparis Vaillant, 1888; Prognurus Jordan & Gilbert, 1898

= Careproctus =

Genus of fishes

Careproctus is a genus of snailfishes found in benthic and benthopelagic habitats in the Atlantic, Pacific, Arctic and Southern Oceans. Whether they truly are absent from the Indian Ocean (except for a couple of species in subantarctic waters) is unknown and might be an artifact of limited sampling. They range from shallow coastal seas in the far north of their range to the abyssal zone, at depths of 6 to 5,459 m (20–17,910 ft). In the Northern Hemisphere they mostly live shallower than Paraliparis, but this pattern is reversed in the Southern Hemisphere. Although almost entirely restricted to very cold waters, a single species, C. hyaleius, lives at hydrothermal vents.

Its generic name is derived from the Ancient Greek κάρα (kára) "face, head" and πρωκτός (prōktόs) "anus", therefore literally meaning "butt-face", because of the position of the anus under the head.

Careproctus have one pair of nostrils and a ventral suction disc but lack a pseudobranch. They are tadpole-like in shape and reach up to 54 cm (1.8 ft) in standard length, but most species are far smaller. Like other snailfish, they lack scales and have a loose gelatinous skin; a few species are covered in prickly spines.

Most species of Careproctus are poorly known, but they feed on small animals and some have unusual breeding behaviors. For example, C. ovigerus appears to be a mouth brooder where the eggs are carried and develop in the males' mouth. C. fulvus has a commensal relationship with glass sponges, laying their eggs in the paragastric cavity. Several other Careproctus species are parasitic on king crabs (such as Lithodes, Neolithodes and Paralithodes, and likely Echidnocerus), laying their egg mass in the gill chamber of the crab, forming a well-protected and well-aerated mobile "home" until they hatch. These parasitic Careproctus do not appear to be host specific, but rather they use various species of king crabs. An individual king crab may even carry the eggs of more than one Careproctus species at the same time. Additionally, small Careproctus—no more than 9 cm (3.5 in) long—have been seen together with Lithodes and Paralomis king crabs, hitching rides by attaching themselves to the crab's legs or back. In contrast, a C. reinhardti (species complex) in an aquarium deposited its eggs on the glass, but whether this resembles its wild behavior is unknown.

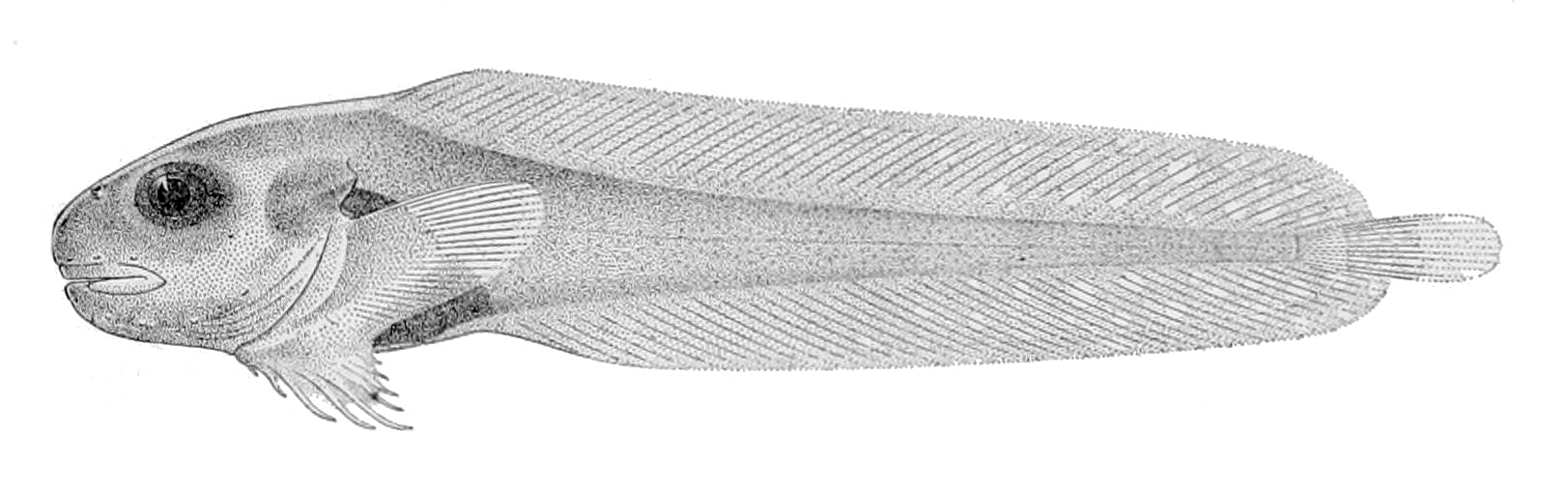
Careproctus attenuatus

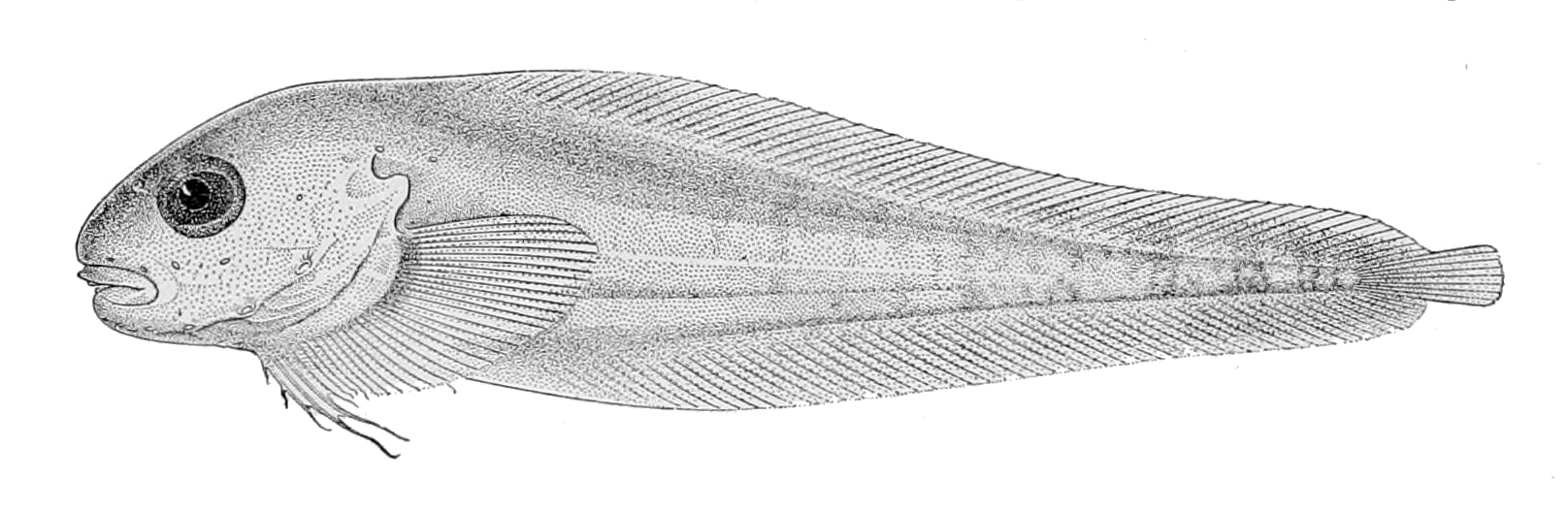
Careproctus bowersianus

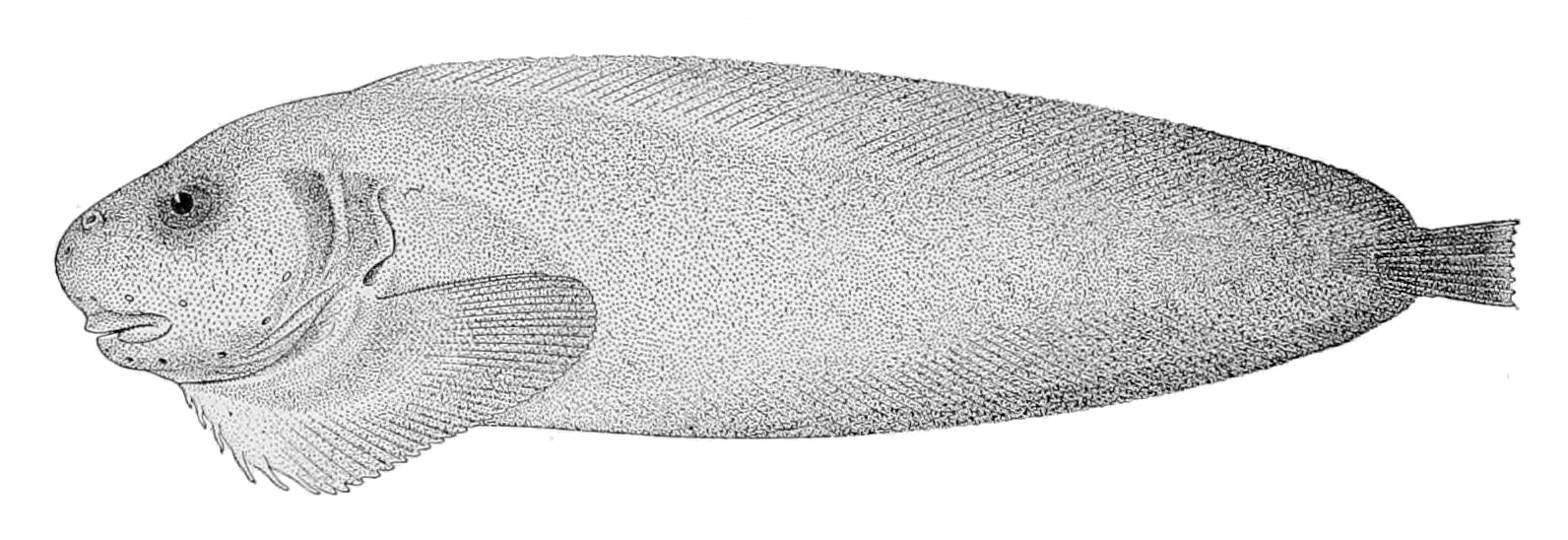
Careproctus furcellus

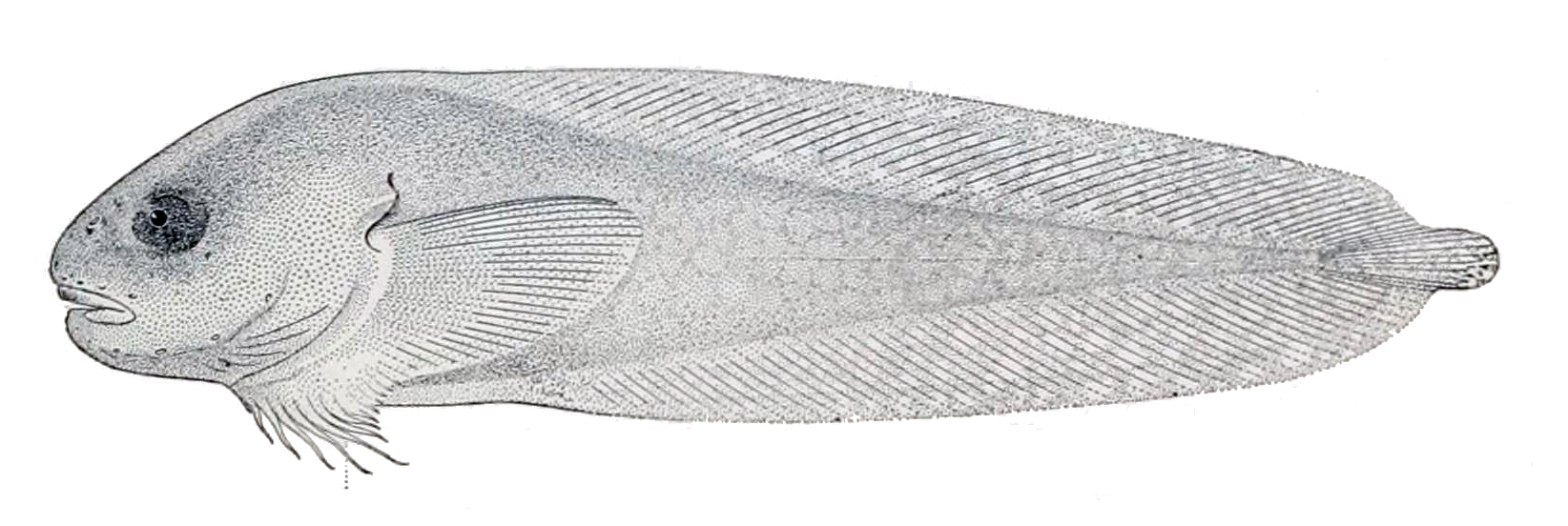
Careproctus mollis

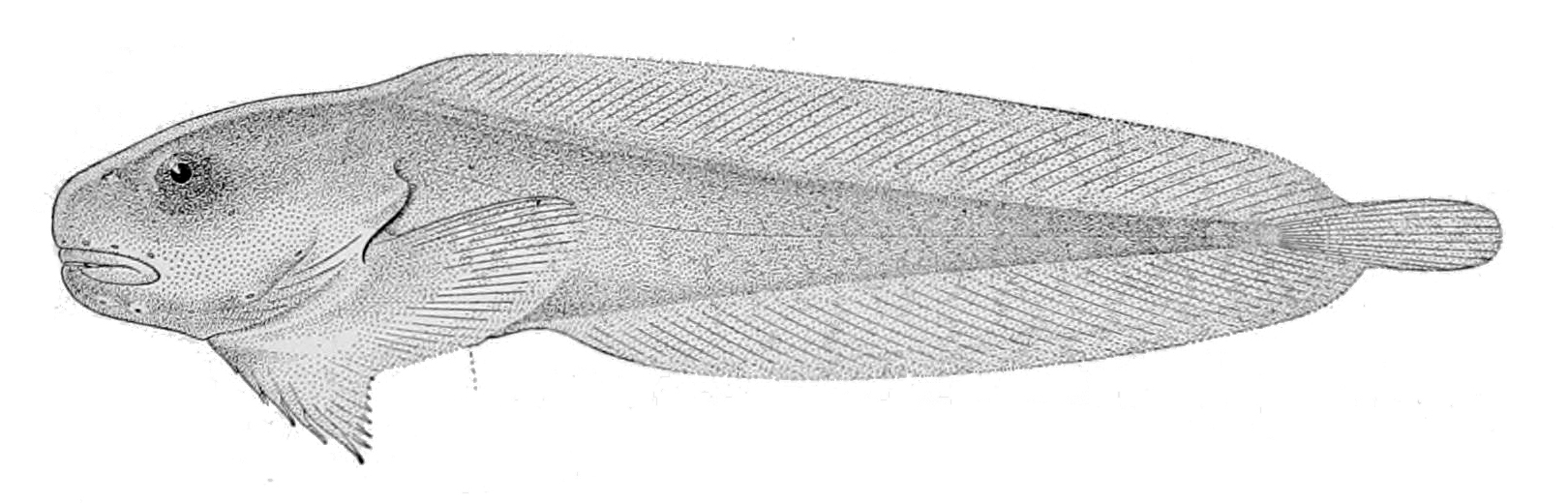
Careproctus opisthotremus

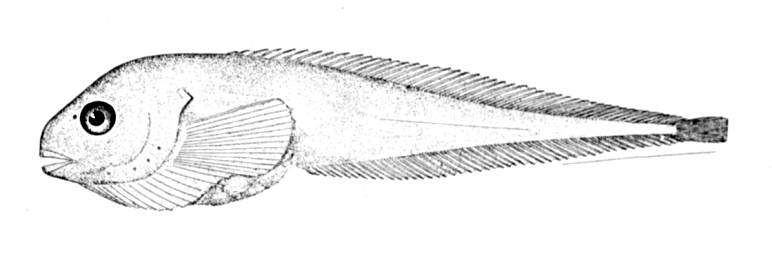
Careproctus ranula

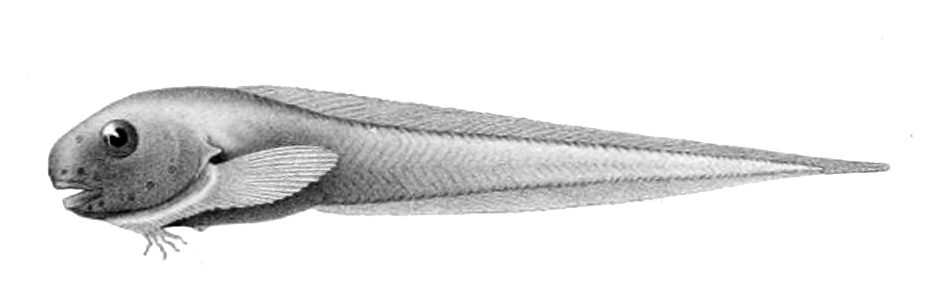
Careproctus reinhardti

== Species ==
There are currently about 125 recognized species in this genus, but new species are regularly described and it is likely to actually contain more than 140. It formerly also included the species now separated in the genus Volodichthys.

- Careproctus abbreviatus Burke, 1930
- Careproctus acaecus Andriashev, 1991 (appendage-less snailfish)
- Careproctus acanthodes C. H. Gilbert & Burke, 1912 (toge snailfish)
- Careproctus aciculipunctatus Andriashev & Chernova, 1997 (finely-speckled snailfish)
- Careproctus acifer Andriashev & Stein, 1998
- Careproctus aculeolatus Andriashev, 1991 (small-spine snailfish)
- Careproctus albescens Barnard, 1927
- Careproctus ambustus J. W. Orr, 2020
- Careproctus ampliceps Andriashev & Stein, 1998
- Careproctus armatus Andriashev, 1991
- Careproctus atakamensis Andriashev, 1998
- Careproctus atrans Andriashev, 1991 (black snailfish)
- Careproctus attenuatus C. H. Gilbert & Burke, 1912
- Careproctus aureomarginatus Andriashev, 1991 (marginate snailfish)
- Careproctus bathycoetus C. H. Gilbert & Burke, 1912
- Careproctus batialis Popov, 1933
- Careproctus bowersianus C. H. Gilbert & Burke, 1912
- Careproctus cactiformis Andriashev, 1990
- Careproctus candida C. H. Gilbert & Burke, 1912 (bigeye snailfish)
- Careproctus canus Kido, 1985
- Careproctus carinatus Chernova, 2014 (keel-belly snailfish)
- Careproctus colletti C. H. Gilbert, 1896 (Alaska snailfish)
- Careproctus colliculi Gerringer et al., 2025 (bumpy snailfish)
- Careproctus comus J. W. Orr & Maslenikov, 2007 (comic snailfish)
- Careproctus continentalis Andriashev & Prirodina, 1990
- Careproctus credispinulosus Andriashev & Prirodina, 1990
- Careproctus crozetensis Duhamel & N. J. King, 2007
- Careproctus curilanus C. H. Gilbert & Burke, 1912
- Careproctus cyclocephalus Kido, 1983
- Careproctus cypseluroides P. Y. Schmidt, 1950
- Careproctus cypselurus (D. S. Jordan & C. H. Gilbert, 1898)
- Careproctus derjugini Chernova, 2005 (Derjugin's snailfish)
- Careproctus discoveryae Duhamel & N. J. King, 2007
- Careproctus dubius Zugmayer, 1911 (doubtful snailfish)
- Careproctus ectenes C. H. Gilbert, 1896
- Careproctus eltaninae Andriashev & Stein, 1998
- Careproctus falklandica (Lönnberg, 1905)
- Careproctus faunus J. W. Orr & Maslenikov, 2007 (mischievous snailfish)
- Careproctus fedorovi Andriashev & Stein, 1998
- Careproctus filamentosus Stein, 1978
- Careproctus fulvus Chernova, 2014 (fulvous snailfish)
- Careproctus furcellus C. H. Gilbert & Burke, 1912, 1912
- Careproctus georgianus Lönnberg, 1905
- Careproctus gilberti Burke, 1912 (small-disk snailfish)
- Careproctus griseldea Lloris, 1982
- Careproctus guillemi Matallanas, 1998
- Careproctus homopterus C. H. Gilbert & Burke, 1912
- Careproctus hyaleius Geistdoerfer, 1994
- Careproctus improvisus Andriashev & Stein, 1998
- Careproctus inflexidens Andriashev & Stein, 1998
- Careproctus kamikawai J. W. Orr, 2012 (arbiter snailfish)
- Careproctus karaensis Chernova, 2014 (Kara snailfish)
- Careproctus kidoi Knudsen & Møller, 2008 (Kido's snailfish)
- Careproctus knipowitschi Chernova, 2005 (Knipowitsch's snailfish)
- Careproctus lacmi Andriashev & Stein, 1998
- Careproctus latiosus Andriashev & Chernova, 2011 (broad-mouth snailfish)
- Careproctus leptorhinus Andriashev & Stein, 1998
- Careproctus lerikimae J. W. Orr, Y. Kai & Nakabo, 2015 (dusty snailfish)
- Careproctus longifilis Garman, 1892
- Careproctus longipectoralis Duhamel, 1992
- Careproctus longipinnis Burke, 1912 (long-feather snailfish)
- Careproctus lycopersicus J. W. Orr, 2012
- Careproctus macranchus Andriashev, 1991
- Careproctus macrodiscus P. Y. Schmidt, 1950
- Careproctus macrophthalmus Chernova, 2005 (big-eye snailfish)
- Careproctus maculosus Stein, 2006
- Careproctus magellanicus Matallanas & Pequeño, 2000
- Careproctus marginatus Kido, 1988
- Careproctus maslenikovae J. W. Orr, 2021 (blushing snailfish)
- Careproctus mederi P. Y. Schmidt, 1916
- Careproctus melanuroides P. Y. Schmidt, 1950
- Careproctus melanurus C. H. Gilbert, 1892 (black-tail snailfish)
- Careproctus merretti Andriashev & Chernova, 1988 (Merret's snailfish)
- Careproctus mica Chernova, 2014 (babbie snailfish)
- Careproctus micropus (Günther, 1887) (small-eye snailfish)
- Careproctus microstomus Stein, 1978
- Careproctus minimus Andriashev & Stein, 1998
- Careproctus mollis C. H. Gilbert & Burke, 1912
- Careproctus moskalevi Andriashev & Chernova, 2012 (Moskalev's snailfish)
- Careproctus narilobus Stein, 2012
- Careproctus nigricans P. Y. Schmidt, 1950
- Careproctus notosaikaiensis Y. Kai, Ikeguchi & Nakabo, 2011
- Careproctus novaezelandiae Andriashev, 1990
- Careproctus opisthotremus C. H. Gilbert & Burke, 1912
- Careproctus oregonensis Stein, 1978 (small-fin snailfish)
- Careproctus ostentum C. H. Gilbert, 1896
- Careproctus ovigerus (C. H. Gilbert, 1896) (abyssal snailfish)
- Careproctus pallidus (Vaillant, 1888)
- Careproctus parvidiscus Imamura & Nobetsu, 2002
- Careproctus parviporatus Andriashev & Stein, 1998
- Careproctus patagonicus Matallanas & Pequeño, 2000
- Careproctus paxtoni Stein, Chernova & Andriashev, 2001 (blunt-tooth snailfish)
- Careproctus pellucicauda Stein, 2012
- Careproctus pellucidus C. H. Gilbert & Burke, 1912 (pellucid snailfish)
- Careproctus phasma C. H. Gilbert, 1896 (spectral snailfish)
- Careproctus polarsterni Duhamel, 1992
- Careproctus profundicola Duhamel, 1992
- Careproctus pseudoprofundicola Andriashev & Stein, 1998
- Careproctus pycnosoma C. H. Gilbert & Burke, 1912
- Careproctus ranula (Goode & T. H. Bean, 1879) (froggy snailfish)
- Careproctus rastrinoides P. Y. Schmidt, 1950
- Careproctus rastrinus C. H. Gilbert & Burke, 1912 (salmon snailfish)
- Careproctus rausuensis Machi, Nobetsu & Yabe, 2012
- Careproctus reinhardti (Krøyer, 1862) (sea tadpole)
- Careproctus rhodomelas C. H. Gilbert & Burke, 1912
- Careproctus rimiventris Andriashev & Stein, 1998
- Careproctus rosa Chernova, 2014 (rose snailfish)
- Careproctus roseofuscus C. H. Gilbert & Burke, 1912 (round snailfish)
- Careproctus rotundifrons H. Sakurai & Shinohara, 2008
- Careproctus sandwichensis Andriashev & Stein, 1998
- Careproctus scaphopterus Andriashev & Stein, 1998
- Careproctus scottae W. M. Chapman & DeLacy, 1934 (peach-skin snailfish)
- Careproctus segaliensis C. H. Gilbert & Burke, 1912
- Careproctus seraphimae P. Y. Schmidt, 1950
- Careproctus shigemii Matsuzaki, Mori, Kamiunten, Yanagimoto & Kai, 2020
- Careproctus simus [C. H. Gilbert, 1896
- Careproctus sinensis C. H. Gilbert & Burke, 1912
- Careproctus solidus Chernova, 1999 (firm-body snailfish)
- Careproctus spectrum T. H. Bean, 1890 (stippled snailfish)
- Careproctus spiraki J. W. Orr, 2021 (pimpled snailfish)
- Careproctus steini Andriashev & Prirodina, 1990
- Careproctus stigmatogenus Stein, 2006
- Careproctus tapirus Chernova, 2005 (tapir snailfish)
- Careproctus telescopus Chernova, 2005 (telescope snailfish)
- Careproctus tomiyamai
- Careproctus trachysoma C. H. Gilbert & Burke, 1912 (rough snailfish)
- Careproctus tricapitidens Andriashev & Stein, 1998
- Careproctus uter Chernova, 2014 (drop-shaped snailfish)
- Careproctus vladibeckeri Andriashev & Stein, 1998
- Careproctus yanceyi Gerringer et al., 2025 (dark snailfish)
- Careproctus zachirus Kido, 1985
- Careproctus zispi Andriashev & Stein, 1998
