= Paraliparis tasmaniensis =

Scientific classification
- Kingdom: Animalia
- Phylum: Chordata
- Class: Actinopterygii
- Order: Perciformes
- Suborder: Cottoidei
- Family: Liparidae
- Genus: Paraliparis
- Species: P. tasmaniensis

Binomial name
- Paraliparis tasmaniensis Stein, Chernova & Andriashev, 2001

Species of fish

Paraliparis tasmaniensis, the Tasmanian snailfish, is a species of snailfish found in the eastern Indian Ocean.

== Size ==
This species reaches a length of 20.1 cm (7.9 in).
