= Paraliparis labiatus =

Scientific classification
- Kingdom: Animalia
- Phylum: Chordata
- Class: Actinopterygii
- Order: Perciformes
- Suborder: Cottoidei
- Family: Liparidae
- Genus: Paraliparis
- Species: P. labiatus

Binomial name
- Paraliparis labiatus Stein, Chernova & Andriashev, 2001

Species of fish

Paraliparis labiatus, the biglip snailfish, is a species of snailfish found in the eastern Indian Ocean.

== Size ==
This species reaches a length of 15.0 cm (5.9 in).
