= Peter R. Last =

Australian ichthyologist

Peter Robert Last is an Australian ichthyologist, curator of the Australian National Fish Collection and a senior principal research scientist at CSIRO Marine and Atmospheric Research (CMAR) in Hobart, Tasmania. He is an elasmobranch expert and has described many new species of shark.

Last graduated with a PhD from the University of Tasmania in 1983 with a thesis titled "Aspects of the ecology and zoogeography of fishes from soft-bottom habitats of the Tasmanian shore zone".

Last is the co-author of Sharks and Rays of Australia and co-author of A revision of the Australian handfishes (Lophiiformes: Brachionichthyidae), with descriptions of three new genera and nine new species. In 2009, the Australian Society for Fish Biology awarded Last its highest honour, the K. Radway Allen Award.

== Taxon described by him ==
- See Category:Taxa named by Peter R. Last

== Taxon named in his honor ==
- The Rusty snailfish, Paraliparis lasti Stein, Chernova & Andriashev, 2001 is a species of snailfish found in the Eastern Indian Ocean.
- The Trawl perchlet, Plectranthias lasti J. E. Randall & Hoese, 1995 is a species of fish in the family Serranidae occurring in the Western Pacific Ocean.
