= Paraliparis eastmani =

Scientific classification
- Kingdom: Animalia
- Phylum: Chordata
- Class: Actinopterygii
- Order: Perciformes
- Suborder: Cottoidei
- Family: Liparidae
- Genus: Paraliparis
- Species: P. eastmani

Binomial name
- Paraliparis eastmani Stein, Chernova & Andriashev, 2001

Species of fish

Paraliparis eastmani, the thickskin snailfish, is a species of snailfish found in the south-western Pacific Ocean.

== Size ==
This species reaches a length of 18.3 cm (7.2 in).

== Etymology ==
The fish is named in honor of Joseph T. Eastman (b. 1944), of Ohio University, for his "valuable" studies on the natural history, physiology, and origins of Antarctic fishes
