= Seguam =

Seguam may refer to:

- Seguam Island, an island in the Andreanof Islands in the Aleutian Islands in Alaska.
- Seguam Pass, a strait between Amlia Island and Seguam Island in the Aleutian Islands in Alaska.
