= Paraliparis atrolabiatus =

Conservation status
- Data Deficient (IUCN 3.1)

Scientific classification
- Kingdom: Animalia
- Phylum: Chordata
- Class: Actinopterygii
- Order: Perciformes
- Suborder: Cottoidei
- Family: Liparidae
- Genus: Paraliparis
- Species: P. atrolabiatus

Binomial name
- Paraliparis atrolabiatus Stein, Chernova & Andriashev, 2001

Species of fish

Paraliparis atrolabiatus, the darklip snailfish, is a species of snailfish found in the eastern Indian Ocean.

== Size ==
This species reaches a length of 11.4 cm (4.5 in).
