= Paraliparis abyssorum =

Conservation status
- Data Deficient (IUCN 3.1)

Scientific classification
- Kingdom: Animalia
- Phylum: Chordata
- Class: Actinopterygii
- Order: Perciformes
- Suborder: Cottoidei
- Family: Liparidae
- Genus: Paraliparis
- Species: P. abyssorum

Binomial name
- Paraliparis abyssorum Andriashev & Chernova, 1997

Species of fish

Paraliparis abyssorum is a species of fish in the family Liparidae (snailfish).

== Description ==
Paraliparis abyssorum is maximum 11.3 cm (4.4 in) long, and brown in colour. Its mouth is terminal (i.e. pointing straight forward) and small, with simple teeth.

== Habitat ==
Paraliparis abyssorum lives in the northeast Atlantic Ocean, to the southwest of Ireland; it was first discovered off the Porcupine Bank. It lives in the bathydemersal zone, up to 3,715 m (12,188 ft) deep, hence its specific name abyssorum ("of the depths").

== Behaviour ==
Paraliparis abyssorum is a demersal spawner, meaning that it deposits eggs in a pre-prepared nest on or under the seafloor. Its eggs are 3 mm (0.12 in) diameter and have a volume of 14 mm^{3} (0.00085 cu in).
