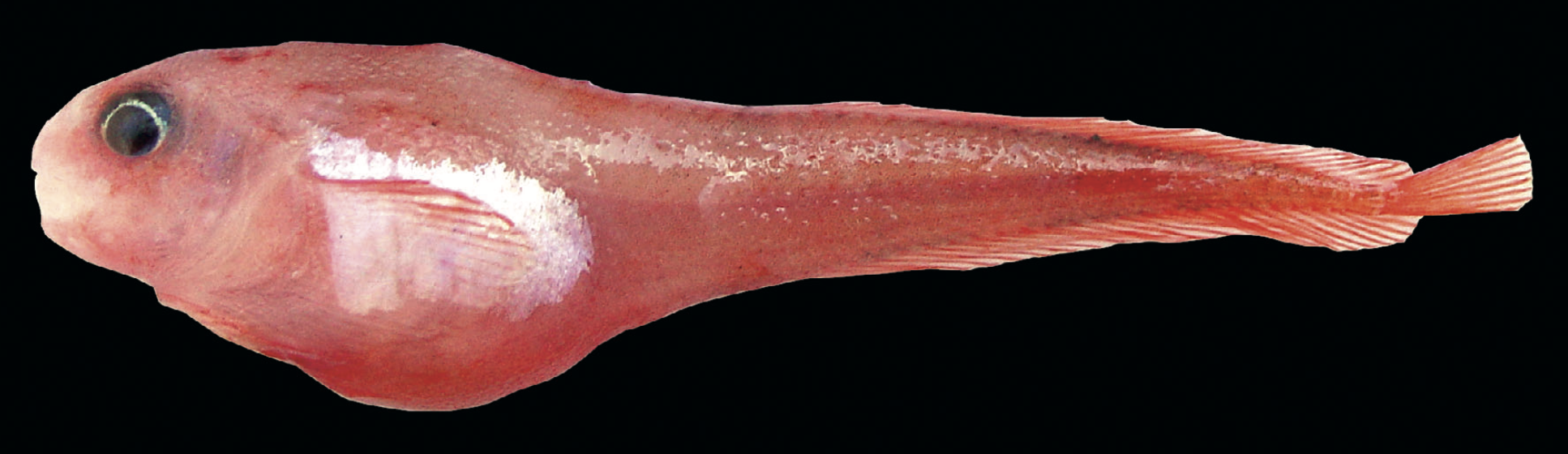

Scientific classification
- Domain: Eukaryota
- Kingdom: Animalia
- Phylum: Chordata
- Class: Actinopterygii
- Order: Perciformes
- Suborder: Cottoidei
- Family: Liparidae
- Genus: Careproctus
- Species: C. spiraki

Binomial name
- Careproctus spiraki J. W. Orr, 2021

= Careproctus spiraki =

Species of fish

Careproctus spiraki, or pimpled snailfish, is a small, marine, bottom-dwelling snailfish. The type specimen was collected in a bottom trawl 457 meters deep in Seguam Pass in the Aleutian Islands. The species was first described to science by J. W. Orr in 2021.

== Description ==
The description of this species is based on 19 individuals collected from deep water in the western Aleutians from 2000 to 2018. Their length varied from 38.7 mm to 52.5 mm. The head is rounded and tapers to a slender tail. They had between 38 and 43 dorsal-fin rays and 10 to 12 caudal-fin rays. They had 4 to 8 gill rakers. The mouth of this species is about 1 cm wide and is lined with small teeth.

These fish are pink-colored. Since seawater absorbs longer wavelengths of light, this color makes them harder to see for predators.

This species is distinguished from similar North Pacific snailfishes by its more slender body which is covered in small bumps topped with tiny prickles, and anterior dorsal-fin rays that stick out of the fin's membrane. It is distinguished from the similar Careproctus maslenikovae by its more slender, less robust body.

== Distribution ==
Careproctus spiraki has been collected from Kiska Island to Unmak Island in waters between 193 meters and 447 meters deep. All of the collections were from bottom trawls suggesting this species is benthic. Given the small number of deep-water trawls looking for tiny, non-commercial species of fish, it is possible that the species ranges unnoticed beyond the bounds of existing collections.

== Life history ==
Little is known of the life history of this species. One was found in the stomach of darkfin sculpin, Malacocottus zonurus, reinforcing the suggestion of its pink body color that C. spiraki is a prey species for larger fish. Among the nineteen C. spiraki collected were reproductively mature females from 39 to 52 mm long which were ripe with yolked eggs. No ripe males with swollen testes were found, leaving open the timing of spawning.
