= Paraliparis lasti =

Scientific classification
- Kingdom: Animalia
- Phylum: Chordata
- Class: Actinopterygii
- Order: Perciformes
- Suborder: Cottoidei
- Family: Liparidae
- Genus: Paraliparis
- Species: P. lasti

Binomial name
- Paraliparis lasti Stein, Chernova & Andriashev, 2001

Species of fish

Paraliparis lasti, the rusty snailfish, is a species of snailfish found in the eastern Indian Ocean.

== Size ==
This species reaches a length of 18.5 cm (7.3 in).

== Etymology ==
The fish is named in honor of Peter R. Last, of the CSIRO Marine & Atmospheric Research.
