= Paraliparis dewitti =

Scientific classification
- Kingdom: Animalia
- Phylum: Chordata
- Class: Actinopterygii
- Order: Perciformes
- Suborder: Cottoidei
- Family: Liparidae
- Genus: Paraliparis
- Species: P. dewitti

Binomial name
- Paraliparis dewitti Stein, Chernova & Andriashev, 2001

Species of fish

Paraliparis dewitti, the brown ribbed snailfish, is a species of snailfish found in the eastern Indian Ocean.

== Size ==
This species reaches a length of 19.2 cm (7.6 in).

== Etymology ==
The fish is named in honor of ichthyologist-oceanographer Hugh H. DeWitt (1933-1995), of the University of Maine.
