= Paraliparis hobarti =

Scientific classification
- Kingdom: Animalia
- Phylum: Chordata
- Class: Actinopterygii
- Order: Perciformes
- Suborder: Cottoidei
- Family: Liparidae
- Genus: Paraliparis
- Species: P. hobarti

Binomial name
- Paraliparis hobarti Stein, Chernova & Andriashev, 2001

Species of fish

Paraliparis hobarti, the palepore snailfish, is a species of snailfish found in the Indo-Pacific.

== Size ==
This species reaches a length of 12.4 cm (4.9 in).
