= Paraliparis gomoni =

Scientific classification
- Kingdom: Animalia
- Phylum: Chordata
- Class: Actinopterygii
- Division: Teleostei
- Order: Perciformes
- Suborder: Cottoidei
- Family: Liparidae
- Genus: Paraliparis
- Species: P. gomoni

Binomial name
- Paraliparis gomoni Stein, Chernova & Andriashev, 2001

Species of fish

Paraliparis gomoni, the squarechin snailfish, is a species of snailfish found in the eastern Indian Ocean.

== Size ==
This species reaches a length of 11 cm (4.3 in).

== Etymology ==
The fish is named in honor of Martin F. Gomon (b. 1945), the Senior Curator of Ichthyology, at the Museum Victoria, Melbourne, Australia.
