= Paraliparis auriculatus =

Scientific classification
- Kingdom: Animalia
- Phylum: Chordata
- Class: Actinopterygii
- Order: Perciformes
- Suborder: Cottoidei
- Family: Liparidae
- Genus: Paraliparis
- Species: P. auriculatus

Binomial name
- Paraliparis auriculatus Stein, Chernova & Andriashev, 2001

Species of fish

Paraliparis auriculatus, the smallcheek snailfish, is a species of snailfish found in the eastern Indian Ocean.

== Size ==
This species reaches a length of 13.1 cm (5.2 in).
