= Careproctus pallidus =

Conservation status
- Data Deficient (IUCN 3.1)

Scientific classification
- Kingdom: Animalia
- Phylum: Chordata
- Class: Actinopterygii
- Order: Perciformes
- Suborder: Cottoidei
- Family: Liparidae
- Genus: Careproctus
- Species: C. pallidus

Binomial name
- Careproctus pallidus (Vaillant, 1888)

Synonyms
- Enantioliparis pallidus Vaillant, 1888; Careproctus crassus de Buen, 1961

Species of fish

Careproctus pallidus is a species of snailfish found around Tierra del Fuego in the far south of South America.

This is an unusual fish compared to its congeners. Most Careproctus species are found in deep water but this is a fish of shallow coastal waters. It is an orange fish, up to 70 mm standard length with a heavy body and large pectoral and caudal fins and superficially resembles members of the largely Northern Hemisphere genus Liparis.
