= Volodichthys =

Scientific classification
- Kingdom: Animalia
- Phylum: Chordata
- Class: Actinopterygii
- Order: Perciformes
- Suborder: Cottoidei
- Family: Liparidae
- Genus: Volodichthys; Balushkin, 2012

Type species
- Volodichthys parini Andriashev & Prirodina, 1990

Genus of fishes

Volodichthys is a genus of snailfishes found in deep water, more than 750 m (2,460 ft), of southern oceans near Antarctica and southern South America. Its members were formerly included in the genus Careproctus.

== Species ==
There are currently five recognized species in this genus:

- Volodichthys catherinae (Andriashev & Stein, 1998)
- Volodichthys herwigi (Andriashev, 1991)
- Volodichthys parini (Andriashev & Prirodina, 1990)
- Volodichthys smirnovi (Andriashev, 1991)
- Volodichthys solovjevae Balushkin, 2012
