= Merret's snailfish =

Conservation status
- Data Deficient (IUCN 3.1)

Scientific classification
- Kingdom: Animalia
- Phylum: Chordata
- Class: Actinopterygii
- Order: Perciformes
- Suborder: Cottoidei
- Family: Liparidae
- Genus: Careproctus
- Species: C. merretti

Binomial name
- Careproctus merretti Andriashev & Chernova, 1988

Species of ray-finned fish

Merret's snailfish (Careproctus merretti), also called the snakehead snailfish, is a species of fish in the family Liparidae.

== Etymology ==
It is named for the British ichthyologist Nigel Merrett (born 1940).

== Description ==
Merret's snailfish is silvery-pink in colour, with a black peritoneum. Its maximum length is 20.5 centimetres (8.1 in). It has 69 vertebrae. Its hypural plate (expanded ends of the hypurals that form a wide, fan-like plate onto which the caudal fin rays are attached) is single, and there are no epurals.

== Habitat ==
Merret's snailfish lives in the Porcupine Abyssal Plain; it is bathydemersal and non-migratory, living at depths of up to 3,990 m (13,090 ft).
