= Careproctus aciculipunctatus =

Conservation status
- Data Deficient (IUCN 3.1)

Scientific classification
- Kingdom: Animalia
- Phylum: Chordata
- Class: Actinopterygii
- Order: Perciformes
- Suborder: Cottoidei
- Family: Liparidae
- Genus: Careproctus
- Species: C. aciculipunctatus

Binomial name
- Careproctus aciculipunctatus Andriashev & Chernova, 1997

Species of fish

Careproctus aciculipunctatus, also called the speckled snailfish, is a species of fish in the family Liparidae (snailfish).

The specific name is from Latin acicula ("spinule") and punctatus ("dotted").

== Description ==
Careproctus aciculipunctatus is maximum 21 cm (8.3 in) long, Its body and peritoneum are black.

The pleural ribs are absent and there is one hypural plate, without slit. Its mouth is terminal (pointed straight forward) and its teeth simple. Its body is densely echinated (bristled) with very small spinules.

== Habitat ==
Careproctus aciculipunctatus lives in the northeast Atlantic Ocean, to the southwest of Ireland; it was first discovered off the Porcupine Bank. It lives in the bathydemersal zone, up to 4,100 m (13,500 ft) deep.
