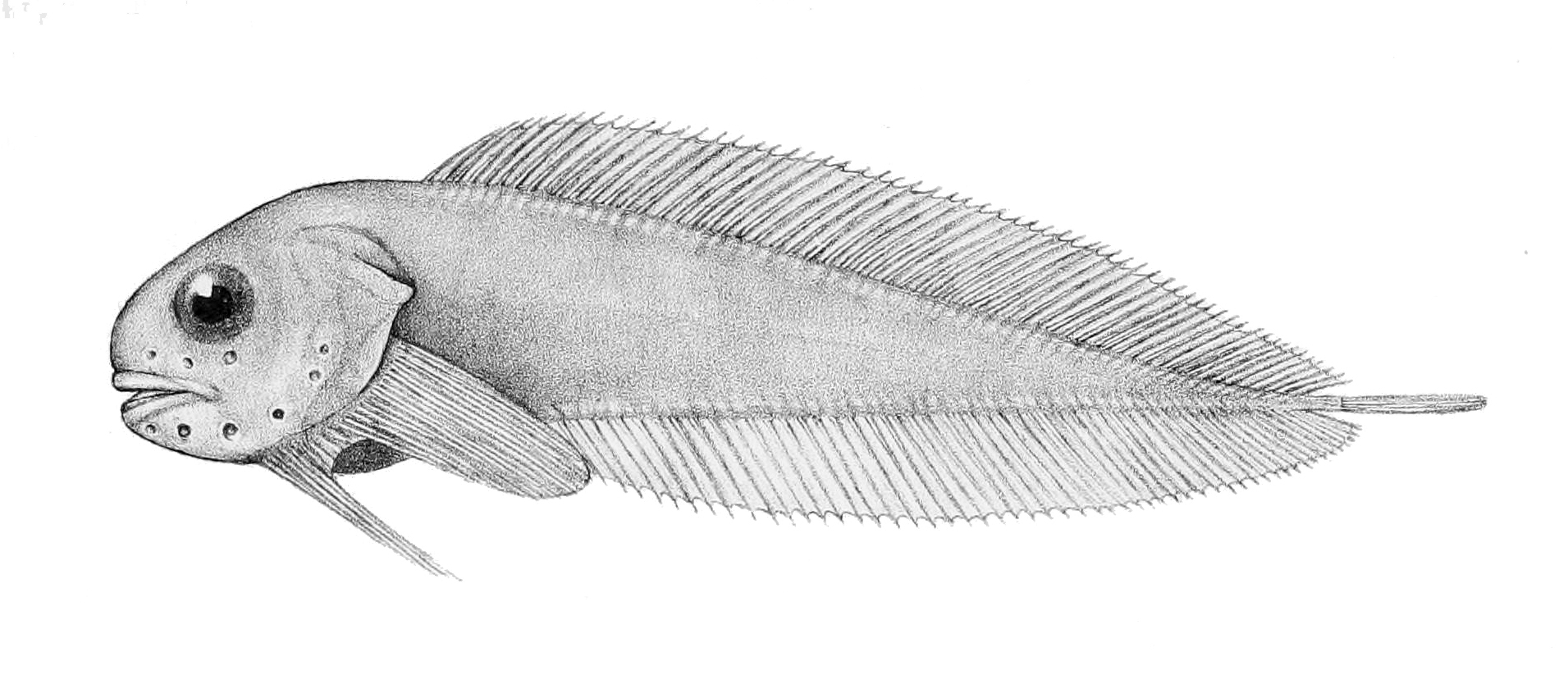
- Paraliparis antarcticus

Scientific classification
- Kingdom: Animalia
- Phylum: Chordata
- Class: Actinopterygii
- Order: Perciformes
- Suborder: Cottoidei
- Family: Liparidae
- Genus: Paraliparis; Collett, 1879

Type species
- Liparis bathybii Collett, 1879

Synonyms
- Amitra Goode, 1881; Monomitra Goode, 1883; Gymnolycodes Vaillant, 1888; Amitrichthys D. S. Jordan & Evermann, 1896; Hilgendorfia Goode & T. H. Bean, 1896; Merophorus Garman, 1899; Edentoliparis Andriashev, 1990

= Paraliparis =

Genus of fishes

Paraliparis is a genus of fish in the family Liparidae, the snailfishes. It is found in benthic, benthopelagic and pelagic habitats in all the world's oceans.

Paraliparis species have one pair of nostrils and lack a pseudobranch or ventral suction disc.

The generic name means "resembling Liparis."

== Species ==
There are currently 148 recognized species in this genus:

- Paraliparis abyssorum Andriashev & Chernova, 1997
- Paraliparis acutidens Chernova, 2006
- Paraliparis adustus Busby & Cartwright, 2009
- Paraliparis albeolus P. Y. Schmidt, 1950
- Paraliparis albescens C. H. Gilbert, 1915
- Paraliparis alius Stein, 2012
- Paraliparis amerismos Stein, 2012
- Paraliparis andriashevi Stein & Tompkins, 1989
- Paraliparis anomalus Murasaki et al., 2025 (anomalous snailfish)
- Paraliparis antarcticus Regan, 1914
- Paraliparis anthracinus Stein, Chernova & Andriashev, 2001 (Coalskin snailfish)
- Paraliparis aspersus Andriashev, 1992
- Paraliparis ater Stein, Chernova & Andriashev, 2001 (Sooty snailfish)
- Paraliparis atramentatus C. H. Gilbert & Burke, 1912
- Paraliparis atrolabiatus Stein, Chernova & Andriashev, 2001 (Darklip snailfish)
- Paraliparis attenuatus Garman, 1899
- Paraliparis auriculatus Stein, Chernova & Andriashev, 2001 (Smallcheek snailfish)
- Paraliparis australiensis Stein, Chernova & Andriashev, 2001 (Australian snailfish)
- Paraliparis australis Gilchrist, 1902
- Paraliparis avellaneus Stein, Chernova & Andriashev, 2001 (Nutty snailfish)
- Paraliparis badius Stein, Chernova & Andriashev, 2001 (Dark brown snailfish)
- Paraliparis balgueriasi Matallanas, 1999
- Paraliparis bathybius (Collett, 1879) (Black seasnail)
- Paraliparis bipolaris Andriashev, 1997
- Paraliparis brunneocaudatus Stein, Chernova & Andriashev, 2001 (Browntail snailfish)
- Paraliparis brunneus Stein, Chernova & Andriashev, 2001 (Brown snailfish)
- Paraliparis bullacephalus Busby & Cartwright, 2009 (Bubble-head snailfish)
- Paraliparis calidus Cohen, 1968 (Lowfin snailfish)
- Paraliparis camilarus Stein, 2012
- Paraliparis caninus Chernova & Prut'ko, 2011
- Paraliparis carlbondi Stein, 2005
- Paraliparis cephalus C. H. Gilbert, 1892 (Swellhead snailfish)
- Paraliparis cerasinus Andriashev], 1986
- Paraliparis challengeri Andriashev, 1993
- Paraliparis charcoti Duhamel, 1992
- Paraliparis copei Goode & T. H. Bean, 1896
  - Paraliparis copei copei Goode & T. H. Bean, 1896 (Blacksnout seasnail)
  - Paraliparis copei gibbericeps Andriashev, 1982
  - Paraliparis copei kerguelensis Andriashev, 1982
  - Paraliparis copei wilsoni Richards, 1966
- Paraliparis coracinus Stein, Chernova & Andriashev, 2001
- Paraliparis costatus Stein, Chernova & Andriashev, 2001 (Black ribbed snailfish)
- Paraliparis csiroi Stein, Chernova & Andriashev, 2001 (Loweye snailfish)
- Paraliparis dactyloides P. Y. Schmidt, 1950
- Paraliparis dactylosus C. H. Gilbert, 1896 (Red snailfish)
- Paraliparis darwini Stein, & Chernova, 2002
- Paraliparis deani Burke, 1912 (Prickly snailfish)
- Paraliparis debueni Andriashev]], 1986
- Paraliparis delphis Stein, Chernova & Andriashev 2001 (Dolphin snailfish)
- Paraliparis devriesi Andriashev, 1980
- Paraliparis dewitti Stein, Chernova & Andriashev, 2001 (Brown ribbed snailfish)
- Paraliparis diploprora Andriashev, 1986
- Paraliparis dipterus Kido, 1988
- Paraliparis duhameli Andriashev, 1994
- Paraliparis eastmani Stein, Chernova & Andriashev, 2001 (Thickskin snailfish)
- Paraliparis edwardsi (Vaillant, 1888)
- Paraliparis ekaporus Stein, 2012
- Paraliparis eltanini Stein & Tompkins, 1989Stein
- Paraliparis em Gerringer et al., 2025 (sleek snailfish)
- Paraliparis entochloris C. H. Gilbert & Burke, 1912
- Paraliparis epacrognathus Stein, 2012
- Paraliparis exilis Stein, 2012
- Paraliparis fimbriatus Garman, 1892
- Paraliparis freeborni Stein, 2012
- Paraliparis fuscolingua Stein & Tompkins, 1989
- Paraliparis galapagosensis Stein & Chernova, 2002
- Paraliparis garmani Burke, 1912 (Pouty seasnail)
- Paraliparis gomoni Stein, Chernova & Andriashev, 2001 (Squarechin snailfish)
- Paraliparis gracilis Norman, 1930
- Paraliparis grandis P. Y. Schmidt, 1950
- Paraliparis haploporus Stein, 2012
- Paraliparis hawaiiensis Stein & Drazen, 2014
- Paraliparis hobarti Stein, Chernova & Andriashev, 2001 (Palepore snailfish)
- Paraliparis holomelas C. H. Gilbert, 1896
- Paraliparis hubbsi Andriashev, 1986
- Paraliparis hureaui Matallanas, 1999
- Paraliparis hystrix Merrett, 1983
- Paraliparis impariporus Stein, Chernova & Andriashev, 2001 (Unipore snailfish)
- Paraliparis incognita Stein & Tompkins, 1989
- Paraliparis infeliciter Stein, Chernova & Andriashev, 2001 (Badluck snailfish)
- Paraliparis kocki Chernova, 2006
- Paraliparis kreffti Andriashev, 1986
- Paraliparis labiatus Stein, Chernova & Andriashev, 2001 (Biglip snailfish)
- Paraliparis lasti Stein, Chernova & Andriashev, 2001 (Rusty snailfish)
- Paraliparis latifrons Garman, 1899 (Bigpored snailfish)
- Paraliparis leobergi Andriashev, 1982
- Paraliparis leucogaster Andriashev, 1986
- Paraliparis leucoglossus Andriashev, 1986
- Paraliparis liparinus (Goode, 1881)
- Paraliparis longicaecus Stein, 2012
- Paraliparis macrocephalus Chernova & Eastman, 2001
- Paraliparis macropterus Stein, 2012
- Paraliparis magnoculus Stein, 2012
- Paraliparis mandibularis Kido, 1985
- Paraliparis mawsoni Andriashev, 1986
- Paraliparis megalopus Stein, 1978
- Paraliparis meganchus Andriashev, 1982 (Slit branchial paraliparis)
- Paraliparis melanobranchus C. H. Gilbert & Burke, 1912
- Paraliparis membranaceus Günther, 1887
- Paraliparis mentikoilon Stein, 2012
- Paraliparis mento C. H. Gilbert, 1892
- Paraliparis meridionalis Kido, 1985
- Paraliparis merodontus Stein, Meléndez C. & Kong U., 1991
- Paraliparis mexicanus Chernova, 2006
- Paraliparis molinai Stein, Meléndez C. & Kong U., 1991
- Paraliparis monoporus Andriashev & Neyelov, 1979
- Paraliparis murieli Matallanas, 1984
- Paraliparis nassarum Stein & Fitch, 1984
- Paraliparis neelovi Andriashev, 1982
- Paraliparis nigellus Chernova & Møller, 2008
- Paraliparis nigrolineatus Stein, 2012
- Paraliparis nullansa Stein, 2012
- Paraliparis obliquosus Chernova & Duhamel, 2003
- Paraliparis obtusirostris Stein, Chernova & Andriashev, 2001 (Bluntsnout snailfish)
- Paraliparis operculosus Andriashev, 1979 (Longeared snailfish)
- Paraliparis orbitalis Stein, 2012
- Paraliparis orcadensis Matallanas & Pequeño, 2000
- Paraliparis parviradialis Stein, 2012
- Paraliparis paucidens Stein, 1978 (Toothless snailfish)
- Paraliparis pearcyi Stein, 2012
- Paraliparis pectoralis Stein, 1978
- Paraliparis penicillus Z. H. Baldwin & J. W. Orr, 2010 (Comet snailfish)
- Paraliparis piceus Stein, Chernova & Andriashev, 2001 (Tarred snailfish)
- Paraliparis plagiostomus Stein, Chernova & Andriashev, 2001 (Sharkmouth snailfish)
- Paraliparis plicatus Stein, 2012
- Paraliparis porcus Chernova, 2006
- Paraliparis posteroporus Stein, 2012
- Paraliparis pseudokreffti Stein, 2012
- Paraliparis retrodorsalis Stein, Chernova & Andriashev, 2001 (Shortfin snailfish)
- Paraliparis rosaceus C. H. Gilbert, 1890 (Pink snailfish)
- Paraliparis rossi Chernova & Eastman, 2001
- Paraliparis selti Linley, Gerringer & Canto-Hernández, 2022 (Blue Atacama snailfish)
- Paraliparis skeliphrus Stein, 2005
- Paraliparis ruficometes Kenta Murasaki, Munehiro Takami, & Atsushi Fukui, 2018
- Paraliparis stehmanni Andriashev, 1986
- Paraliparis tangaroa Stein, 2012
- Paraliparis tasmaniensis Stein, Chernova & Andriashev, 2001 (Tasmanian snailfish)
- Paraliparis terraenovae Regan, 1916
- Paraliparis tetrapteryx Andriashev & Neyelov, 1979
- Paraliparis thalassobathyalis Andriashev, 1982
- Paraliparis tompkinsae Andriashev, 1992
- Paraliparis trilobodon Andriashev & Neyelov, 1979
- Paraliparis trunovi Andriashev, 1986
- Paraliparis ulochir C. H. Gilbert, 1896 (Broadfin snailfish)
- Paraliparis vaillanti Chernova, 2004
- Paraliparis valentinae Andriashev & Neyelov, 1984
- Paraliparis violaceus Chernova, 1991
- Paraliparis vipera Chernova & Prut'ko, 2011
- Paraliparis voroninorum Stein, 2012
- Paraliparis wakataka Murasaki, Kai, Misawa & Narimatsu 2024
- Paraliparis wolffi Duhamel & N. J. King, 2007
