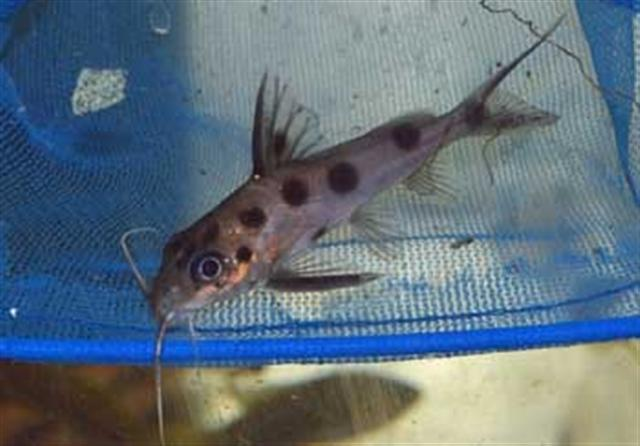

Conservation status
- Least Concern (IUCN 3.1)

Scientific classification
- Domain: Eukaryota
- Kingdom: Animalia
- Phylum: Chordata
- Class: Actinopterygii
- Order: Siluriformes
- Family: Mochokidae
- Genus: Synodontis
- Species: S. notatus

Binomial name
- Synodontis notatus Vaillant, 1893

= Synodontis notatus =

Species of fish

Synodontis notatus, known as the onespot squeaker, the one-spot synodontis, or the domino syno, is a species of upside-down catfish native to the Congo Basin of the Democratic Republic of the Congo, and the Republic of the Congo. It was first described by French zoologist Léon Vaillant in 1893. The specific name "notatus" comes from the Latin word for "marked", as with a spot.

== Description ==
The body of the fish is greyish-brown to olive colored on the back, with a gold sheen on the operculum. The ventral surface is light colored. Most individuals will have a single, dark spot, but some may display multiple spots or no spots, and may not have the same number on each side. The spots do not grow as the fish grows, so they will appear smaller in adults.

Like other members of the genus, this fish has a humeral process, which is a bony spike that is attached to a hardened head cap on the fish and can be seen extending beyond the gill opening. The first ray of the dorsal fin and the pectoral fins have a hardened first ray which is serrated. The caudal fin is deeply forked. It has short, cone-shaped teeth in the upper jaw. In the lower jaw, the teeth are s-shaped and movable. The fish has one pair of long maxillary barbels, extending far beyond the operculum, and two pairs of mandibular barbels that are often branched. The small adipose fin is set far back.

This species grows to a length of 25 centimetres (9.8 in) SL although specimens up to 26.5 centimetres (10.4 in) TL have been recorded in the wild.

== Habitat ==
In the wild, the species inhabits tropical waters with a temperature range of 22 to 26 °C (72 to 79 °F), a pH of 6.0 – 7.5, and dH range of 4-15. It has been found throughout the Congo River basin. It has also been found in the upper Kasai River systems, the Lufira River system, and the Luapula River system.
