= Paraliparis bipolaris =

Conservation status
- Data Deficient (IUCN 3.1)

Scientific classification
- Kingdom: Animalia
- Phylum: Chordata
- Class: Actinopterygii
- Order: Perciformes
- Suborder: Cottoidei
- Family: Liparidae
- Genus: Paraliparis
- Species: P. bipolaris

Binomial name
- Paraliparis bipolaris Andriyashev, 1997

Species of fish

Paraliparis bipolaris is a species of fish in the family Liparidae (snailfish).

== Description ==
Paraliparis bipolaris is up to 9.2 cm (3.6 in) long.

Its specific name means "of the two poles", an allusion to how it is closely related to Paraliparis kreffti, an Antarctic fish.

== Habitat ==
Paraliparis bipolaris lives in the northeast Atlantic Ocean, off Ireland's southwest coast. It is bathydemersal, living at 2,585–3,040 m (8,481–9,974 ft).
