= Paraliparis em =

Scientific classification
- Kingdom: Animalia
- Phylum: Chordata
- Class: Actinopterygii
- Order: Perciformes
- Suborder: Cottoidei
- Family: Liparidae
- Genus: Paraliparis
- Species: P. em

Binomial name
- Paraliparis em Gerringer, 2025

Species of fish

Paraliparis em, the sleek snailfish, is a species of Liparidae (or snailfish) discovered in the eastern Pacific Ocean.

== Description ==
Paraliparis em lacks a ventral suction disk, which fish in the Careproctus genus are known to have. This is one of the reasons it is placed in the paraliparis genus.

== Habitat ==
The species was discovered over 13,000 feet underwater between 180 and 190 miles off the coast.

== Discovery ==
The fish was discovered by the Monterey Bay Aquarium Research Institute. Careproctus yanceyi was also discovered.
