= Paraliparis csiroi =

Scientific classification
- Kingdom: Animalia
- Phylum: Chordata
- Class: Actinopterygii
- Order: Perciformes
- Suborder: Cottoidei
- Family: Liparidae
- Genus: Paraliparis
- Species: P. csiroi

Binomial name
- Paraliparis csiroi Stein, Chernova & Andriashev, 2001

Species of fish

Paraliparis csiroi, the loweye snailfish, is a species of snailfish found in the eastern Indian Ocean.

== Size ==
This species reaches a length of 16.3 cm (6.4 in).

== Etymology ==
The fish is named after the Commonwealth Scientific and Industrial Research Organization (CSIRO), the supporting agency for all Australian fisheries research.
