= Paraliparis posteroporus =

Scientific classification
- Kingdom: Animalia
- Phylum: Chordata
- Class: Actinopterygii
- Order: Perciformes
- Suborder: Cottoidei
- Family: Liparidae
- Genus: Paraliparis
- Species: P. posteroporus

Binomial name
- Paraliparis posteroporus Stein, 2012

Species of fish

Paraliparis posteroporus is a species of snailfish found in the Southern Ocean.

== Size ==
This species reaches a length of 24.0 cm (9.4 in).
