= Paraliparis megalopus =

Conservation status
- Data Deficient (IUCN 3.1)

Scientific classification
- Kingdom: Animalia
- Phylum: Chordata
- Class: Actinopterygii
- Order: Perciformes
- Suborder: Cottoidei
- Family: Liparidae
- Genus: Paraliparis
- Species: P. megalopus

Binomial name
- Paraliparis megalopus Stein, 2012

Species of fish

Paraliparis megalopus is a species of snailfish found in the north-eastern Pacific Ocean.

== Size ==
This species reaches a length of 13.9 cm (5.5 in).
