= Paraliparis violaceus =

Scientific classification
- Domain: Eukaryota
- Kingdom: Animalia
- Phylum: Chordata
- Class: Actinopterygii
- Order: Perciformes
- Suborder: Cottoidei
- Family: Liparidae
- Genus: Paraliparis
- Species: P. violaceus

Binomial name
- Paraliparis violaceus Chernova, 1991

Species of fish

Paraliparis violaceus is a species of snailfish found in the Arctic.

== Size ==
This species reaches a length of 14.4 cm (5.7 in).
