= Paraliparis fuscolingua =

Scientific classification
- Kingdom: Animalia
- Phylum: Chordata
- Class: Actinopterygii
- Order: Perciformes
- Suborder: Cottoidei
- Family: Liparidae
- Genus: Paraliparis
- Species: P. fuscolingua

Binomial name
- Paraliparis fuscolingua Stein, & Tompkins, 1989

Species of fish

Paraliparis fuscolingua is a species of snailfish found in the Southern Ocean.
