= Osteodiscus andriashevi =

Scientific classification
- Kingdom: Animalia
- Phylum: Chordata
- Class: Actinopterygii
- Order: Perciformes
- Suborder: Cottoidei
- Family: Liparidae
- Genus: Osteodiscus
- Species: O. andriashevi

Binomial name
- Osteodiscus andriashevi Pitruk & Fedorov, 1990

Species of fish

Osteodiscus andriashevi is a species of marine fish in the family Liparidae (snailfishes or seasnails). This species is known from the deep waters of the Sea of Okhotsk in the northwest Pacific where in occurs at depths of from 766 to 1,950 metres (2,513 to 6,398 ft). It grows to a length of 17.5 centimetres (6.9 in) SL. This species is one of three known members of its genus.

The name Osteodiscus is derived from Greek osteon = bone and discos = disc shape, whereas the species epithet andriashevi is in honor of the ichthyologist Anatoly Andriyashev for his outstanding contribution to the study if systematics and zoogeography of fish, and also in connection with his 80th anniversary.
