= Paraliparis australiensis =

Scientific classification
- Kingdom: Animalia
- Phylum: Chordata
- Class: Actinopterygii
- Order: Perciformes
- Suborder: Cottoidei
- Family: Liparidae
- Genus: Paraliparis
- Species: P. australiensis

Binomial name
- Paraliparis australiensis Stein, Chernova & Andriashev, 2001

Species of fish

Paraliparis australiensis, the Australian snailfish, is a species of snailfish found in the south-eastern Indian Ocean.

== Size ==
This species reaches a length of 16.4 cm (6.5 in).
