= Paraliparis carlbondi =

Scientific classification
- Kingdom: Animalia
- Phylum: Chordata
- Class: Actinopterygii
- Order: Perciformes
- Suborder: Cottoidei
- Family: Liparidae
- Genus: Paraliparis
- Species: P. carlbondi

Binomial name
- Paraliparis carlbondi Stein, 2005

Species of fish

Paraliparis carlbondi is a species of snailfish. It was described in 2005 from two specimens collected in 1966 off the coast of Peru.

This fish, standard length up to 110 mm, is most similar to Paraliparis merodontus but differs most notably by having teeth in both jaws rather than just in the lower jaw. It can be distinguished from other congeners by having a horizontal mouth and by the shape of the pectoral fins.
