= Paraliparis acutidens =

Scientific classification
- Domain: Eukaryota
- Kingdom: Animalia
- Phylum: Chordata
- Class: Actinopterygii
- Order: Perciformes
- Suborder: Cottoidei
- Family: Liparidae
- Genus: Paraliparis
- Species: P. acutidens

Binomial name
- Paraliparis acutidens Chernova, 2006

Species of fish

Paraliparis acutidens is a species of snailfish found in the Atlantic Ocean, the Antarctic as well as the western part of the Scotia Sea.

== Size ==
This species reaches a length of 13.2 cm (5.2 in).
