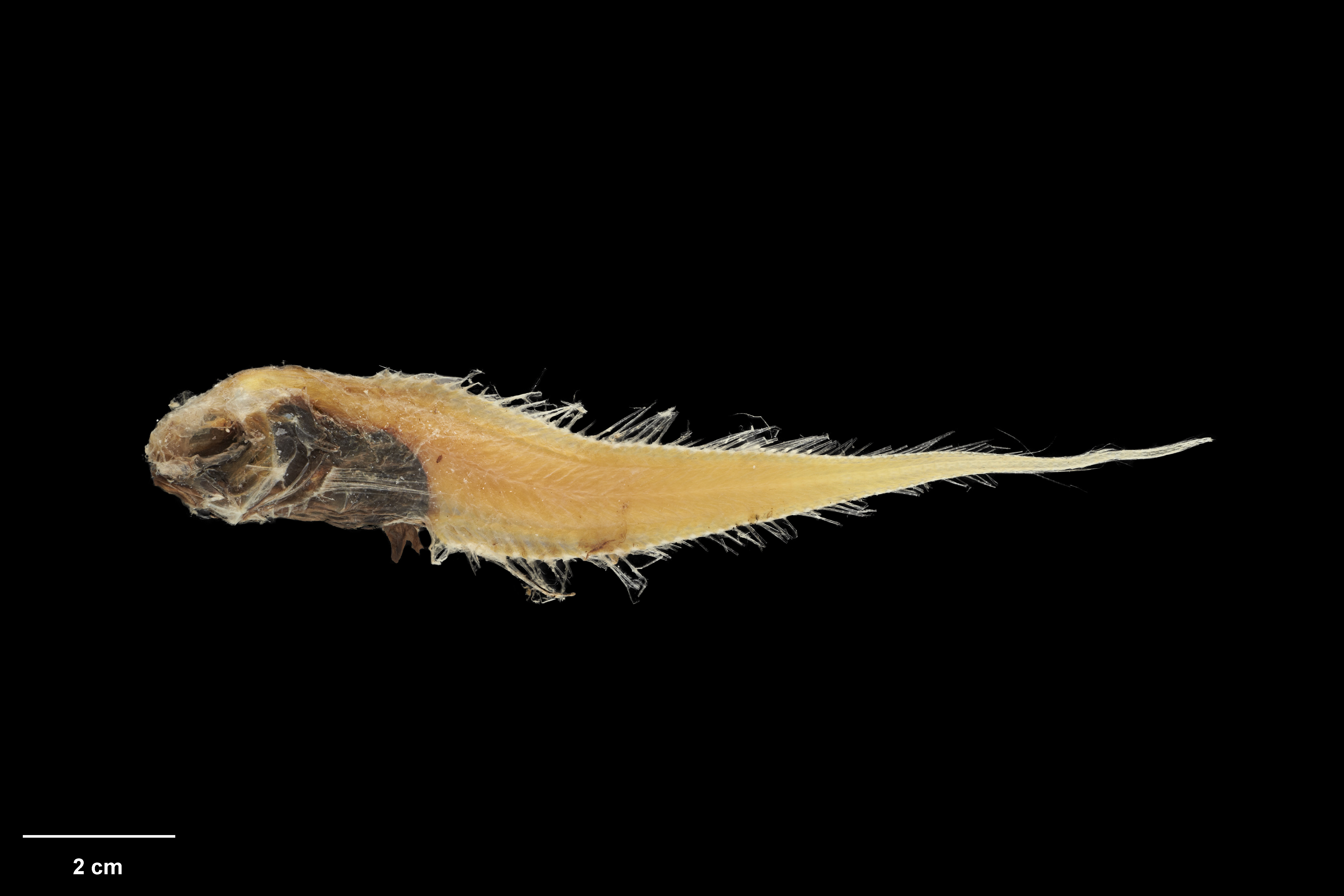

Scientific classification
- Kingdom: Animalia
- Phylum: Chordata
- Class: Actinopterygii
- Order: Perciformes
- Suborder: Cottoidei
- Family: Liparidae
- Genus: Paraliparis
- Species: P. pseudokreffti

Binomial name
- Paraliparis pseudokreffti Stein, 2012

= Paraliparis pseudokreffti =

Species of fish

Paraliparis pseudokreffti is a species of snailfish found in the south-western Pacific Ocean.

== Size ==
This species reaches a length of 12.8 cm (5.0 in).
