= Osteodiscus cascadiae =

Scientific classification
- Kingdom: Animalia
- Phylum: Chordata
- Class: Actinopterygii
- Order: Perciformes
- Suborder: Cottoidei
- Family: Liparidae
- Genus: Osteodiscus
- Species: O. cascadiae

Binomial name
- Osteodiscus cascadiae Stein, 1978

Species of fish

Osteodiscus cascadiae, the bigtail snailfish, is a marine fish in the family Liparidae (snailfishes or seasnails). This species is known from the deep waters of the Northeast Pacific (British Columbia, Canada to at least Oregon, United States) where it occurs at depths of 1,900 to 3,000 metres (6,200 to 9,800 ft). It grows to length from 7.4 centimetres (2.9 in) SL (male/unsexed) to 8.5 centimetres (3.3 in) SL (female). This species is one of three known members of its genus. The species name cascadiae refers to the Cascadia Abyssal Plain, a location off Oregon where the fish has been found. A 2025 journal on the discovery of Careproctus colliculi noted that the fish showed genetic similarities.
