= Paraliparis camilarus =

Scientific classification
- Kingdom: Animalia
- Phylum: Chordata
- Class: Actinopterygii
- Division: Teleostei
- Order: Perciformes
- Suborder: Cottoidei
- Family: Liparidae
- Genus: Paraliparis
- Species: P. camilarus

Binomial name
- Paraliparis camilarus Stein, 2012

Species of fish

Paraliparis camilarus is a species of snailfish found in the northwest of Mawson Bank.

== Size ==
This species reaches a length of 28.2 cm (11.1 in).

== Etymology ==
The fish is named in honor of the Commission for the Conservation of Antarctic Living Resources, CCAMLR, under whose auspices and guidance made the collection of this species possible.
