= Paraliparis porcus =

Scientific classification
- Domain: Eukaryota
- Kingdom: Animalia
- Phylum: Chordata
- Class: Actinopterygii
- Order: Perciformes
- Suborder: Cottoidei
- Family: Liparidae
- Genus: Paraliparis
- Species: P. porcus

Binomial name
- Paraliparis porcus Chernova, 2006

Species of fish

Paraliparis porcus is a species of snailfish found in the Atlantic part of Antarctic around Elephant Island.

== Size ==
This species reaches a length of 8.5 cm (3.3 in).
