= Careproctus shigemii =

Scientific classification
- Kingdom: Animalia
- Phylum: Chordata
- Class: Actinopterygii
- Order: Perciformes
- Suborder: Cottoidei
- Family: Liparidae
- Genus: Careproctus
- Species: C. shigemii

Binomial name
- Careproctus shigemii Matsuzaki, Mori, Kamiunten, Yanagimoto & Y. Kai, 2020

Species of snailfish

Careproctus shigemii is a species of snailfish found near Hokkaido, Japan.

== Etymology ==
The fish is named in honor of Shigemi Fujimoto, who was a fisherman of Rausu, Hokkaido, Japan, who assisted the authors' team in collecting various marine organisms, including this species, and who greatly contributed to their efforts to study and understand the marine biodiversity of the Rausu and Shiretoko Peninsula, which is a World Heritage Area.

== Description ==
Careproctus shigemii have an elongated pectoral fin and a gill slit entirely above the fin. The Careproctus shigemii has one suprabranchial pore and trilobed teeth.
