= Paraliparis mexicanus =

Scientific classification
- Domain: Eukaryota
- Kingdom: Animalia
- Phylum: Chordata
- Class: Actinopterygii
- Order: Perciformes
- Suborder: Cottoidei
- Family: Liparidae
- Genus: Paraliparis
- Species: P. mexicanus

Binomial name
- Paraliparis mexicanus Chernova, 2006

Species of fish

Paraliparis mexicanus is a species of snailfish found along the Mexican coast of the eastern-central Pacific Ocean.

== Size ==
This species reaches a length of 16.0 cm (6.3 in).
