= Paraliparis vaillanti =

Scientific classification
- Domain: Eukaryota
- Kingdom: Animalia
- Phylum: Chordata
- Class: Actinopterygii
- Order: Perciformes
- Suborder: Cottoidei
- Family: Liparidae
- Genus: Paraliparis
- Species: P. vaillanti

Binomial name
- Paraliparis vaillanti Chernova, 2004

Species of fish

Paraliparis vaillanti is a species of snailfish found in the north-western Atlantic Ocean primarily in the Laurentia Channel, between Newfoundland and Cape Breton.

== Size ==
This species reaches a length of 10.8 cm (4.3 in).

== Etymology ==
The fish is named in honor of zoologist Léon Vaillant (1834–1914), of the Muséum national d'Histoire naturelle in Paris.
