= Paraliparis incognita =

Scientific classification
- Kingdom: Animalia
- Phylum: Chordata
- Class: Actinopterygii
- Order: Perciformes
- Suborder: Cottoidei
- Family: Liparidae
- Genus: Paraliparis
- Species: P. incognita

Binomial name
- Paraliparis incognita Stein, & Tompkins, 1989

Species of fish

Paraliparis incognita is a species of snailfish found in the Southern Ocean.

== Size ==
This species reaches a length of 9.0 cm (3.5 in).
