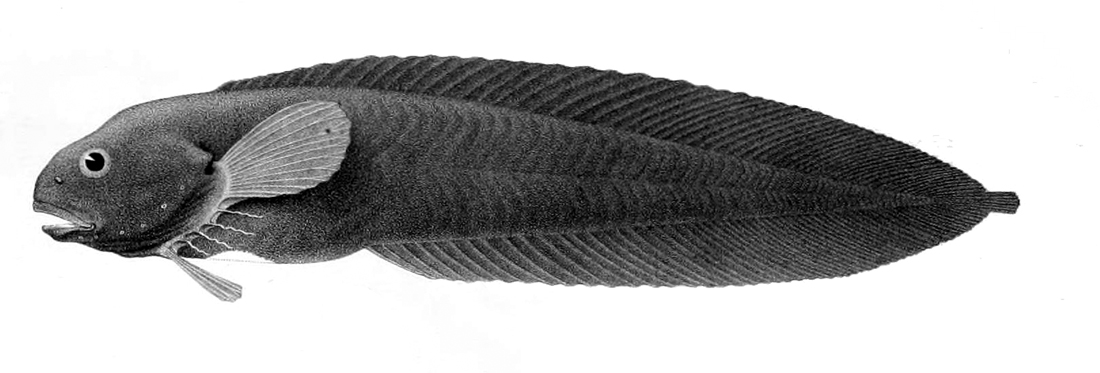

Scientific classification
- Domain: Eukaryota
- Kingdom: Animalia
- Phylum: Chordata
- Class: Actinopterygii
- Order: Perciformes
- Suborder: Cottoidei
- Family: Liparidae
- Genus: Paraliparis
- Species: P. bathybius

Binomial name
- Paraliparis bathybius (Collett, 1879)

Synonyms
- Liparis bathybii Collett, 1879

= Black seasnail =

Species of fish

The black seasnail (Paraliparis bathybius) is a species of fish in the family Liparidae (snailfish).

== Description ==
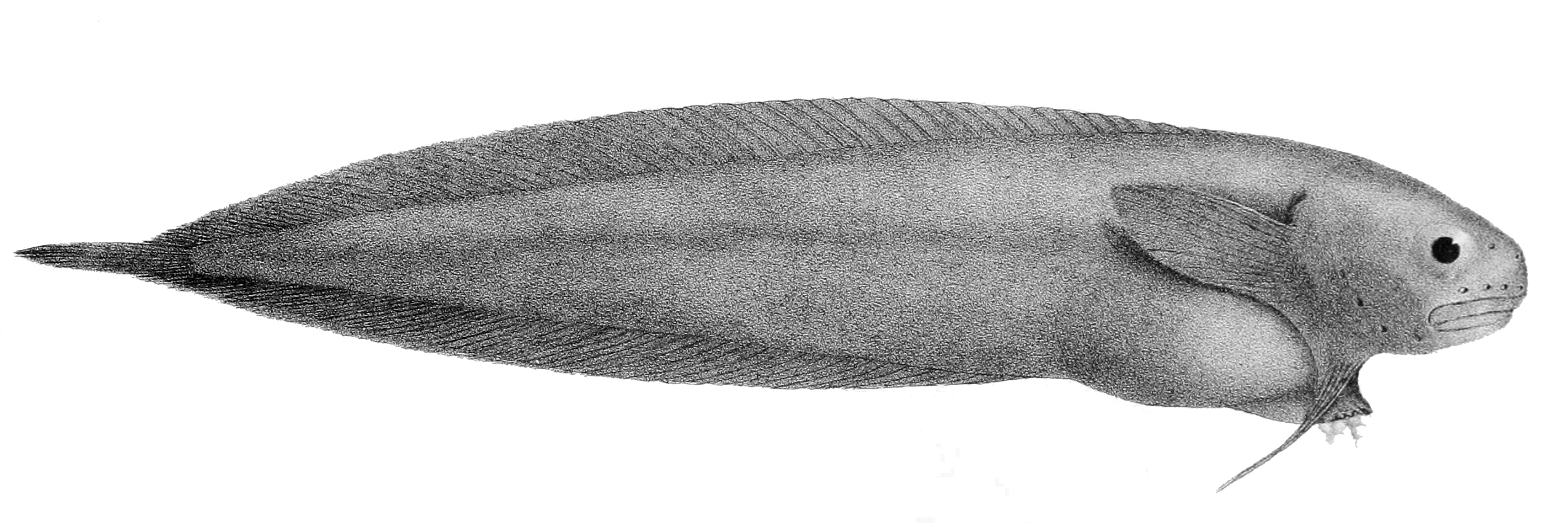
Drawing by R. Mintern, 1887

The black seasnail has a long and tapering body (maximum 25 cm (9.8 in)), black and grey in colour, with large head, dorsal and anal fins that run the length of the body, and a much reduced caudal fin, although it has no adhesive disc, unlike other snailfish. The pectoral fins have two lobes, the lower having 3–4 rays.

== Habitat ==
The black seasnail is bathydemersal, living in the Arctic Ocean and North Atlantic Ocean at depths of 20–4,009 m (66–13,153 ft).

== Behaviour ==
It feeds on amphipods, gastropods and mysids. It spawns in summer, producing up to 400 eggs up to 4.5 mm (0.18 in) in diameter.
