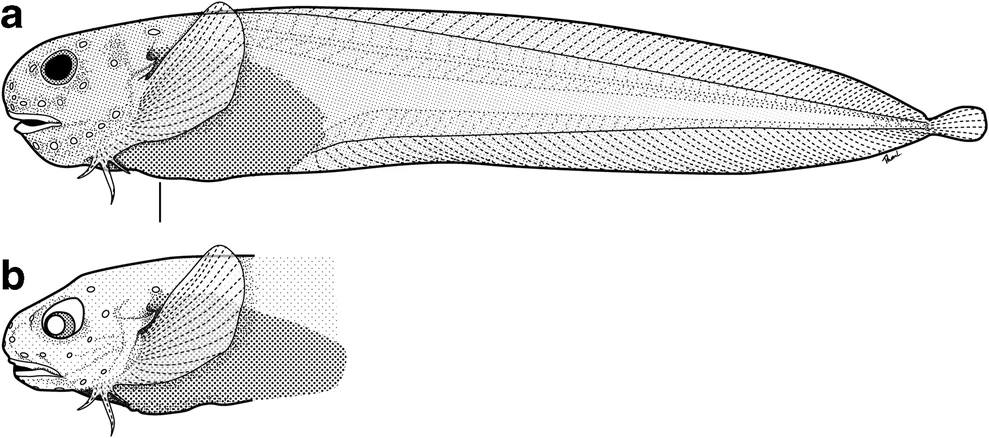
- a. Fresh holotype specimen b. Post-preservation

Scientific classification
- Domain: Eukaryota
- Kingdom: Animalia
- Phylum: Chordata
- Class: Actinopterygii
- Order: Perciformes
- Suborder: Cottoidei
- Family: Liparidae
- Genus: Paraliparis
- Species: P. selti

Binomial name
- Paraliparis selti Linley, Gerringer & Canto-Hernández, 2022

= Paraliparis selti =

Species of deep water snailfish

Paraliparis selti, the blue Atacama snailfish, is a species of deep-sea fish belonging to the family Liparidae, the snailfishes. It is native to the hadal zone of the south-east Pacific Ocean, living at depths of up to 6,714 metres (22,028 ft) under water in the Peru–Chile Trench. It is one of the 200 species of snailfish discovered in the southern hemisphere.

== Description ==
Described in 2022, it was assigned to the genus Paraliparis, a cosmopolitan genus. The species name "selti" is the word for the color blue in the Kunza language (an extinct language from northern Chile and Peru).

Paraliparis selti has large blue eyes similar in appearance to shallow water snailfish species. Paraliparis selti are blue when fresh but turns a dusky color when preserved. The head lacks any head flaps or barbels. P. selti has a deep rounded snout which may change shape after being preserved. This species is 75.9 millimetres (2.99 in) in standard length (SL) and 83 millimetres (3.3 in) in total length (TL).

Paraliparis selti is distinct from other snailfish in the same area due to it having 12 abdominal vertebrae and 65 vertebrae total, more than many other snailfish species (vertebra count is important in meristics). P. selti also has a comparatively low number of rays in its pectoral fins only having 18.
