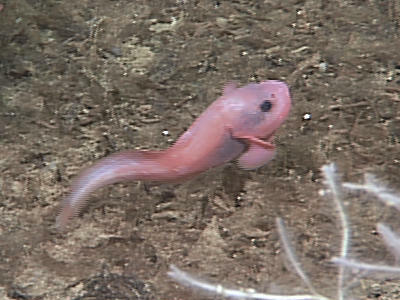
- Juvenile abyssal snailfish

Scientific classification
- Domain: Eukaryota
- Kingdom: Animalia
- Phylum: Chordata
- Class: Actinopterygii
- Order: Perciformes
- Suborder: Cottoidei
- Family: Liparidae
- Genus: Careproctus
- Species: C. ovigerus

Binomial name
- Careproctus ovigerus (Gilbert, 1896)

Synonyms
- Bathyphasma ovigerum Gilbert, 1896

= Careproctus ovigerus =

Species of fish

Careproctus ovigerus, commonly known as the abyssal snailfish, is a species of snailfish found in the northeastern Pacific Ocean. It is found at depths of 1,920–2,910 m (6,300–9,550 ft) off northern British Columbia and off Washington state.

== Taxonomy ==
Careproctus ovigerum was first formally described as in 1896 Bathyphasma ovigerum by the American ichthyologist Charles Henry Gilbert with its type locality given as off the Queen Charlotte Islands in British Columbia. The species is classified in the monospecific genus Bathyphasma by some authorities.

== Description ==
Like other members of the family Liparidae, C. ovigerus is an elongated fish with a gelatinous skin with no scales. The pectoral fins are large and used for locomotion and the pelvic fins are modified into an adhesive disc. C. ovigerus grows to a maximum length of 43 cm (17 in). The dorsal fin has no spines and 40 to 45 soft rays and the anal fin has no spines and 35 to 36 soft rays. The pelvic disc is 26 to 38% of the total length of the fish. Fish in the genus Careproctus can often be distinguished by the pore pattern made by the cephalic pores (the nasal, maxillary, preoperculomandibular and suprabranchial pores); in this species the pattern formed is 2–6–7–1. This species closely resembles C. lycopersicus and C. kamikawai, but those two species have tri-lobed teeth in several broad bands while C. ovigerus has simple, sharp recurved teeth in a single narrow band.

== Behavior ==
Careproctus ovigerus is thought to be a mouth brooder as the holotype, a male, was found to be carrying two developing eggs in his mouth. Two immature females of 18 cm (7 in) standard length had undeveloped ovaries containing many small eggs 1 mm (0.04 in) in diameter, while larger, mature females had fewer, large-yolked eggs in their ovaries, the egg being some 6 to 7 mm (0.24 to 0.28 in) in diameter.
