= Paraliparis kocki =

Scientific classification
- Domain: Eukaryota
- Kingdom: Animalia
- Phylum: Chordata
- Class: Actinopterygii
- Order: Perciformes
- Suborder: Cottoidei
- Family: Liparidae
- Genus: Paraliparis
- Species: P. kocki

Binomial name
- Paraliparis kocki Chernova, 1989

Species of fish

Paraliparis kocki is a species of snailfish found in the Southern Ocean.

== Size ==
This species reaches a length of 27.7 cm (10.9 in).

== Etymology ==
The fish is named in honor of marine biologist Karl-Hermann Kock, because of his contribution to the study of the Antarctic fishes.
