= Paraliparis hystrix =

Conservation status
- Data Deficient (IUCN 3.1)

Scientific classification
- Kingdom: Animalia
- Phylum: Chordata
- Class: Actinopterygii
- Order: Perciformes
- Suborder: Cottoidei
- Family: Liparidae
- Genus: Paraliparis
- Species: P. hystrix

Binomial name
- Paraliparis hystrix Merrett, 1983

Species of fish

Paraliparis hystrix is a species of fish in the family Liparidae (snailfish).

== Description ==
Paraliparis hystrix is up to 14 cm (5.5 in) long. It is white in colour with a black belly and tail.

Its specific name is from Ancient Greek ὕστριξ (hystrix), meaning "bristly". It has no common name in English, but is known in Danish as mørkhalet dybhavsringbug, "dark-tailed deep-sea seasnail".

== Habitat ==
Paraliparis hystrix lives in the north Atlantic Ocean and in Canada's arctic waters off the Davis Strait. It is benthic and bathydemersal, living at 250–1,150 m (820–3,770 ft).
