= Paraliparis pearcyi =

Scientific classification
- Kingdom: Animalia
- Phylum: Chordata
- Class: Actinopterygii
- Order: Perciformes
- Suborder: Cottoidei
- Family: Liparidae
- Genus: Paraliparis
- Species: P. pearcyi

Binomial name
- Paraliparis pearcyi Stein, 2012

Species of fish

Paraliparis pearcyi is a species of snailfish found in the southwestern Pacific Ocean.

== Size ==
This species reaches a length of 11.7 cm (4.6 in).

== Etymology ==
The fish is named in honor of oceanographer William G. Pearcy, of Oregon State University.
