= Careproctus kamikawai =

Arbiter snailfish

Scientific classification
- Kingdom: Animalia
- Phylum: Chordata
- Class: Actinopterygii
- Order: Perciformes
- Suborder: Cottoidei
- Family: Liparidae
- Genus: Careproctus
- Species: C. kamikawai

Binomial name
- Careproctus kamikawai Orr, 2012

Species of ray-finned fish

Careproctus kamikawai, the arbiter snailfish, is a species of snailfish in the family Liparidae, found in the lower parts of the eastern central Pacific Ocean near California. This species is benthopelagic, living at depths between 468 and 1,399 m (1,535 and 4,590 ft). The species was first described by American fisheries biologist James Wilder Orr in 2012, naming the species after Dan J. Kamikawa who collected the holotype. This snailfish has trilobed teeth, a large suction disk, and a large gill opening.

== Description ==
Careproctus kamikawai is similar in appearance to C. ovigerus, but has trilobate teeth on both jaws instead of the simpler teeth in C. ovigerus. C. kamikawai has 43-45 soft dorsal rays, 36-38 soft anal rays, and 48-50 vertebrae. Ripe females measure around 15.3 cm (6.0 in) SL, and have yolked eggs ranging in size from 3.5 to 4.5 mm (0.14 to 0.18 in), while unripe females measure 13.6 cm (5.4 in) and have un-yolked eggs 0.5–1.5 mm (0.02–0.06 in). Females attain a maximum of 17.5 cm (6.9 in) TL.
