= Paraliparis eltanini =

Scientific classification
- Kingdom: Animalia
- Phylum: Chordata
- Class: Actinopterygii
- Order: Perciformes
- Suborder: Cottoidei
- Family: Liparidae
- Genus: Paraliparis
- Species: P. eltanini

Binomial name
- Paraliparis eltanini Stein, & Tompkins, 1989

Species of fish

Paraliparis eltanini is a species of snailfish found in the southeast Pacific Ocean.

== Etymology ==
The fish is named in honor of the U.S. Navy research vessel Eltanin, from which the holotype specimen and also many other Antarctic fishes were collected.
