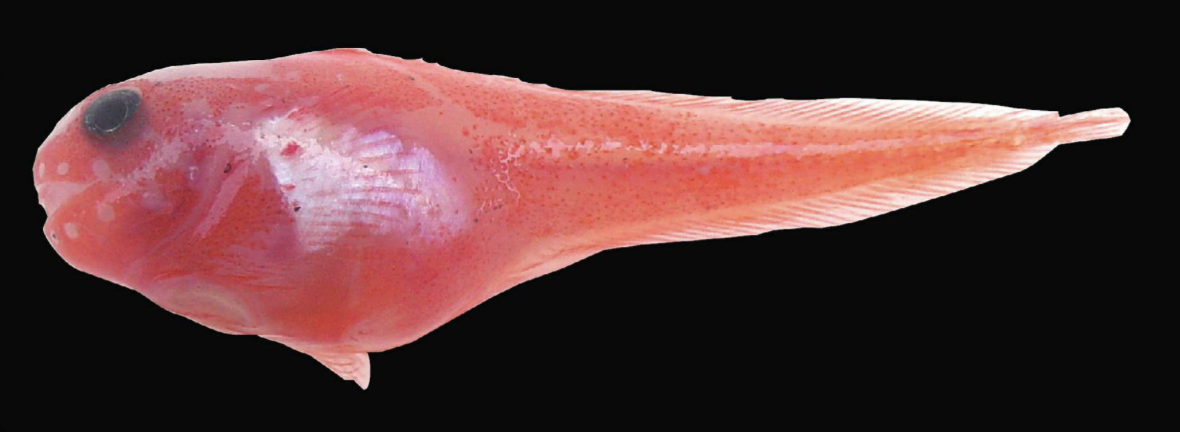

Scientific classification
- Domain: Eukaryota
- Kingdom: Animalia
- Phylum: Chordata
- Class: Actinopterygii
- Order: Perciformes
- Suborder: Cottoidei
- Family: Liparidae
- Genus: Careproctus
- Species: C. maslenikovae

Binomial name
- Careproctus maslenikovae J. W. Orr, 2021

= Careproctus maslenikovae =

Species of fish

Careproctus maslenikovae, or blushing snailfish, is a small, marine, bottom-dwelling snailfish. The type specimen was collected in a bottom trawl 234 meters deep west of the Islands of Four Mountains in the Aleutian Islands. The species was first described to science by J. W. Orr in 2021.

The fish was named for Katherine P. Maslenikov, Collections Manager of the Burke Museum's Fish Collection at the University of Washington who collected two of the four individuals on which the species description is based.

== Description ==
Four individuals were collected from deep water in the western Aleutians from 2002 to 2006. Their length varied from 29.4 mm to 40.3 mm. The head is rounded and tapers to a slender tail, but with a thicker and more robust body than the closely related Careproctus spiraki. The skin is thin and covered with small bumps topped with tiny prickles. They had between 38 and 40 dorsal-fin rays and 10 or 11 caudal-fin rays. They had 6 to 9 gill rakers. The mouth of this species is a little more than 1 cm wide and is lined with small teeth.

These fish are red-orange-colored. Since seawater absorbs longer wavelengths of light, this color makes them harder to see for predators. The lips are unpigmented and the anterior pores of the head are surrounded by unpigmented areas which show as white dots around the mouth.

== Distribution ==
Careproctus maslenikovae has been collected in two locations in the Aleutians, the holotype at the Islands of Four Mountains and three paratypes near Tanaga Island, in waters between 234 meters and 322 meters deep. All of the collections were from bottom trawls suggesting this species is benthic. Given the small number of deep-water trawls looking for tiny, non-commercial species of fish, it is possible that the species ranges unnoticed beyond the bounds of existing collections.

== Life history ==
Little is known of the life history of this species. Among the four C. maslenikovae collected were three reproductively mature females from 36.9 to 40.3 mm long which were ripe with yolked eggs. The single male collected was immature.
