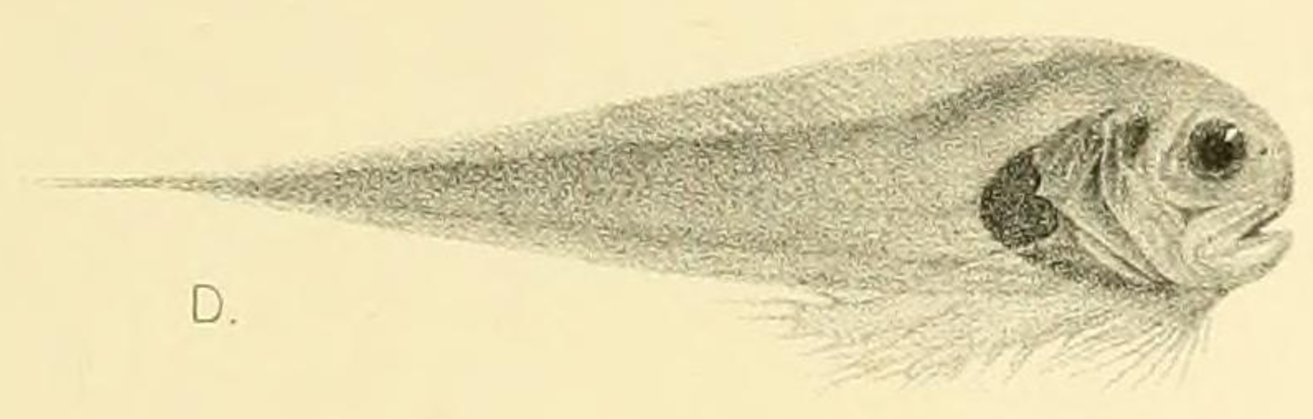
- Illustration of Paraliparis membranaceus, caught off Cape St. Vincent, 400 fathoms deep

Scientific classification
- Domain: Eukaryota
- Kingdom: Animalia
- Phylum: Chordata
- Class: Actinopterygii
- Order: Perciformes
- Suborder: Cottoidei
- Family: Liparidae
- Genus: Paraliparis
- Species: P. membranaceus

Binomial name
- Paraliparis membranaceus Günther, 1887

Synonyms
- Hilgendorfia membranacea Goode & Bean 1895

= Paraliparis membranaceus =

Species of fish

Paraliparis membranaceus is a species of snailfish only known from a single specimen of 57 mm standard length collected in Sarmiento Channel in the fjordlands of southern Chile.

This species is similar to Paraliparis molinai but differs in details of dentition and pectoral fin shape.
