= Paraliparis tangaroa =

Scientific classification
- Kingdom: Animalia
- Phylum: Chordata
- Class: Actinopterygii
- Order: Perciformes
- Suborder: Cottoidei
- Family: Liparidae
- Genus: Paraliparis
- Species: P. tangaroa

Binomial name
- Paraliparis tangaroa Stein, 2012

Species of fish

Paraliparis tangaroa is a species of snailfish found in the Southern Ocean.

== Size ==
This species reaches a length of 13.3 cm (5.2 in).

== Etymology ==
The fish is named after the Maori god of the sea, Tangaroa, who os responsible for all the sea creatures.
