= Paraliparis andriashevi =

Scientific classification
- Kingdom: Animalia
- Phylum: Chordata
- Class: Actinopterygii
- Order: Perciformes
- Suborder: Cottoidei
- Family: Liparidae
- Genus: Paraliparis
- Species: P. andriashevi

Binomial name
- Paraliparis andriashevi Stein, & Tompkins, 1989

Species of fish

Paraliparis andriashevi is a species of snailfish found in the Southern Ocean.

== Etymology ==
The fish is named in honor of Russian ichthyologist Anatoly Petrovich Andriashev (1910-2009), because of his contributions to polar ichthyology and the knowledge of snailfishes.
