= Paraliparis pectoralis =

Scientific classification
- Kingdom: Animalia
- Phylum: Chordata
- Class: Actinopterygii
- Order: Perciformes
- Suborder: Cottoidei
- Family: Liparidae
- Genus: Paraliparis
- Species: P. pectoralis

Binomial name
- Paraliparis pectoralis Stein, 1978

Species of fish

Paraliparis pectoralis is a species of snailfish found in the northern Pacific Ocean.

== Size ==
This species reaches a length of 21.8 cm (8.6 in).
