= Paraliparis skeliphrus =

Scientific classification
- Kingdom: Animalia
- Phylum: Chordata
- Class: Actinopterygii
- Order: Perciformes
- Suborder: Cottoidei
- Family: Liparidae
- Genus: Paraliparis
- Species: P. skeliphrus

Binomial name
- Paraliparis skeliphrus Stein, 2005

Species of fish

Paraliparis skeliphrus is a species of snailfish. It was described in 2005 from a single poorly preserved specimen of 71 mm standard length collected in 1966 off the Chilean coast near Antofagasta.

Despite the poor condition of the specimen, it is sufficiently distinctive to warrant specific status. It is most similar to Paraliparis fimbrianus but differs in the position and shape of the pectoral fins. It can easily be distinguished from other congeners found in the region by a combination of characters including a horizontal mouth, the presence of teeth borne in bands on both jaws and the position of the pectoral fins far forward on the body.

From the circumstances of the collection, this is presumed to be a benthic species.
