= Paraliparis voroninorum =

Scientific classification
- Kingdom: Animalia
- Phylum: Chordata
- Class: Actinopterygii
- Order: Perciformes
- Suborder: Cottoidei
- Family: Liparidae
- Genus: Paraliparis
- Species: P. voroninorum

Binomial name
- Paraliparis voroninorum Stein, 2012

Species of fish

Paraliparis voroninorum is a species of snailfish found in the Southern Ocean.

== Size ==
This species reaches a length of 31.8 cm (12.5 in).

== Etymology ==
The fish is named in honor of Elena Voronina and Vladimir Voronin.
