= Osteodiscus =

Scientific classification
- Kingdom: Animalia
- Phylum: Chordata
- Class: Actinopterygii
- Order: Perciformes
- Suborder: Cottoidei
- Family: Liparidae
- Genus: Osteodiscus; Stein, 1978

Type species
- Osteodiscus cascadiae Stein, 1978

Genus of fishes

Osteodiscus is a genus of snailfishes native to the Pacific Ocean.

== Species ==
There are currently four recognized species in this genus:

- Osteodiscus abyssicola Murasaki, Kai, Endo & Fukui, 2021
- Osteodiscus andriashevi Pitruk & Fedorov, 1990
- Osteodiscus cascadiae Stein, 1978 (Bigtail snailfish)
- Osteodiscus rhepostomias Stein, 2012
