= Paraplatyarthrus =

Scientific classification
- Kingdom: Animalia
- Phylum: Arthropoda
- Class: Malacostraca
- Order: Isopoda
- Suborder: Oniscidea
- Family: Paraplatyarthridae
- Genus: Paraplatyarthrus; Javidkar & King, 2015

Genus of woodlice

Paraplatyarthrus is a genus of isopods described in 2015.

Accepted species:

- Paraplatyarthrus australiensis (Wahrberg, 1922)
- Paraplatyarthrus crebesconiscus Javidkar & King, 2017
- Paraplatyarthrus cunyuensis Javidkar & King, 2017
- Paraplatyarthrus nahidae Javidkar & King, 2017
- Paraplatyarthrus occidentoniscus Javidkar & King, 2017
- Paraplatyarthrus pallidus Javidkar & King, 2017
- Paraplatyarthrus subterraneus Javidkar & King, 2015
