= Paraliparis paucidens =

Scientific classification
- Kingdom: Animalia
- Phylum: Chordata
- Class: Actinopterygii
- Order: Perciformes
- Suborder: Cottoidei
- Family: Liparidae
- Genus: Paraliparis
- Species: P. paucidens

Binomial name
- Paraliparis paucidens Stein, 1978

Species of fish

Paraliparis paucidens, the toothless snailfish, is a species of snailfish found in the north-eastern Pacific Ocean.

== Size ==
This species reaches a length of 16.4 cm (6.5 in).
