= Paraliparis freeborni =

Scientific classification
- Kingdom: Animalia
- Phylum: Chordata
- Class: Actinopterygii
- Order: Perciformes
- Suborder: Cottoidei
- Family: Liparidae
- Genus: Paraliparis
- Species: P. freeborni

Binomial name
- Paraliparis freeborni Stein, 2012

Species of fish

Paraliparis freeborni is a species of snailfish found in the south-western Pacific Ocean.

== Size ==
This species reaches a length of 11.8 cm (4.6 in).

== Etymology ==
The fish is named in honor of scientific illustrator Michelle Freeborn, who was the one who drew the figures for Stein's paper and also for the four-volume Fishes of New Zealand.
