= Paraplatyarthrus australiensis =

Scientific classification
- Kingdom: Animalia
- Phylum: Arthropoda
- Class: Malacostraca
- Order: Isopoda
- Suborder: Oniscidea
- Family: Paraplatyarthridae
- Genus: Paraplatyarthrus
- Species: P. australiensis

Binomial name
- Paraplatyarthrus australiensis (Wahrberg, 1922)

Synonyms
- Trichorhina australiensis Wahrberg, 1922

Species of crustacean

Paraplatyarthrus australiensis is a species of woodlouse found in Western Australia. It was originally described in genus Trichorhina.

== Description ==
Males and females have approximately the same length, but varying widths, 4.5 mm (0.18 in) and 1.6 to 1.7 mm (0.063 to 0.067 in) respectively. It has a whitish yellow coloration and the contents of the intestine are visible. The head is rounded, with small darkly pigmented eyes containing five to six ommatids. It has antennulae similar to Porcellio gracillima. The entire body is covered in scales.
