= Careproctus yanceyi =

Scientific classification
- Kingdom: Animalia
- Phylum: Chordata
- Class: Actinopterygii
- Order: Perciformes
- Suborder: Cottoidei
- Family: Liparidae
- Genus: Careproctus
- Species: C. yanceyi

Binomial name
- Careproctus yanceyi Gerringer, 2025

Species of fish

Careproctus yanceyi, the dark snailfish, is a species of Liparidae (snailfish) found in the eastern Pacific Ocean.

== Description ==
Careproctus yanceyi is described as having a rounded head and a mouth that is horizontal. The fish had a quantity of twenty-two fin rays as well as two pectoral radials.

== Habitat ==
The fish was found over 13,000 feet underwater 180-190 miles off the coast.

== Discovery ==
The fish was discovered by the Monterey Bay Aquarium Research Institute. The species is named after Dr. Paul Yancey of Whitman College.
