= Seguam Pass =

Strait in the Aleutian Islands

Coordinates: 52°11′06″N 172°47′57″W

Seguam Pass is a strait between the Bering Sea and the North Pacific Ocean in the Aleutian Islands in Alaska. It lies between Seguam Island to the east and Amlia Island to the west.
