= Léon Vaillant =

French zoologist (1834–1914)

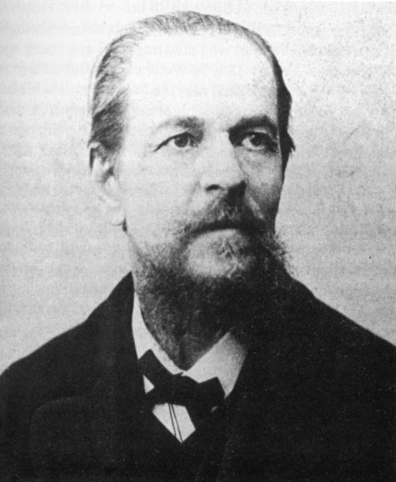
- Léon Vaillant
- Born: 11 November 1834; Paris, France
- Died: 24 November 1914 (aged 80); Paris, France
- Scientific career
- Fields: Herpetology; Ichthyology; Malacology; Zoology
- Workplaces: Muséum national d'histoire naturelle
- Thesis: Recherche sur la famille des Tridacnidés (1865)

Léon Louis Vaillant (French pronunciation: [leɔ̃ lwi vajɑ̃]; 11 November 1834 – 24 November 1914) was a French zoologist. He is most famous for his work in the areas of herpetology, malacology, and ichthyology.

After graduating from the College d'Arras in 1854, he studied medicine and zoology in Paris. He received his medical doctorate in 1861, then continued his zoological studies with Henri Milne-Edwards (1800–1885), earning his degree in natural sciences in 1865. He became a professor at the Museum of Natural History, Paris, in 1875.

Vaillant held a special interest involving the systematics and anatomy of turtles and crocodiles, but he also made significant contributions through his investigations of reptilian physiology and behavior. Of his 200-plus scientific writings, 90 of them are based on herpetological subjects.

He participated in French naval expeditions on the Travailleur in 1880, 1881 and 1882, and on the Talisman in 1883.

== Eponyms ==
There are several species of marine organisms named after Vaillant:

- The ribbon worm, Amphiporus vaillanti (Joubin, 1902)
- The squat lobster, Munidopsis vaillantii (A. Milne-Edwards, 1881)
- Solamen vaillanti (Issel, 1869)
- Solariella vaillanti (Dautzenberg & H. Fischer, 1896)
- Turbonilla vaillanti (Dautzenberg & Fischer, 1896)

There are four species of reptiles named after him:

- Chioninia vaillantii (Boulenger, 1887)
- Micrelaps vaillanti (Mocquard, 1888)
- Liophidium vaillanti (Mocquard, 1901)
- Dopasia ludovici (Mocquard, 1905)

The following fish are named after Vaillant:

- Bagrichthys vaillantii (Popta, 1906)
- The dragon fish, Bathophilus vaillanti (Zugmayer, 1911)
- The shortspine African angler, Lophius vaillanti (Regan, 1903)
- The pike cichlid Crenicichla vaillanti (Pellegrin, 1904)
- Paraliparis vaillanti (Chernova, 2004) is a species of snailfish found in the Northwestern Atlantic Ocean primarily in the Laurentia Channel, between Newfoundland and Cape Breton.
- The Samurai gourami, Sphaerichthys vaillanti (Pellegrin, 1930)
- Thynnichthys vaillanti (Weber & de Beaufort, 1916)
- Astroblepus vaillanti (Regan, 1904)
- Pseudomystus vaillanti (Regan, 1913)

The following fish are possibly named after him:

- Pseudogobio vaillanti (Sauvage, 1878)
- Hypostomus vaillanti (Steindachner, 1877) is a species of catfish in the family Loricariidae. It is native to South America, where it occurs in the Preto River basin in the São Francisco River drainage.
- Anchoviella vaillanti (Steindachner, 1908)
- Rasbora vaillantii (Popta, 1905)

== Written works ==
- Études sur les poissons, Mission scientifique au Mexique et dans l'Amérique centrale – Study of fishes; with Marie Firmin Bocourt (1819–1904).
- Essai sur le système pileux dans l'espèce humaine, 1861, medical dissertation.
- Observations sur la constitution géologique de quelques terrains aux environs de Suez, 1865 – Observations on the geological constitution of terrain and environs of Suez.
- Recherches sur la famille des Tridacnides, 1865 – Research of the family Tridacninae.
- Note sur quelques objets océaniens empruntés au test de différents mollusques, 1868, Bulletin de la société géologique de France – Note on a few items from the Pacific borrowed in order to test different mollusks.
- Quelques mots sur Denys de Montfort à propos d'une brochure parue en 1815, sd Rapport sur les poissons, crustacés et mollusques, 1880, Exposition universelle de 1878, à Paris – Some comments by Pierre Denys de Montfort (1766–1820); report on fishes, crustaceans and mollusks.
- Mémoire sur la disposition des vertèbrés cervicales chez les chéloniens 1880 – Memoir on the disposition of cervical vertebrae of chelonians.
- Expéditions scientifiques du travailleur et du Talisman pendant les annees 1880, 1881, 1882, 1883. Poissons, 1888 – Scientific expeditions of the Travailleur and the Talisman during the years 1880 to 1883.
- Histoire naturelle des annelés marins et d'eau douce, 1889–1890, Collection des Suites à Buffon – Natural history of marine and freshwater annelids; with Jean Louis Armand de Quatrefages de Bréau (1810–1892).
- Les tortues éteintes de l'île Rodriguez d'après les pièces conservées dans les galeries du Muséum, 1893 – Turtles off the island of Rodrigues, in reference to conserved pieces in the museum galleries.
- Histoire naturelle des reptiles. Première partie: Crocodiles et tortues, 1910 – Natural history of reptiles, first part: crocodiles and turtles.

== Taxon described by him ==
- See Category:Taxa named by Léon Vaillant
