= Anatoly Andriyashev =

Russian ichthyologist, marine biologist, and zoogeographer

- Born: Anatoly Petrovich Andriyashev; August 19, 1910; Montpellier, France
- Died: January 4, 2009 (aged 98); Saint Petersburg, Russia
- Citizenship: Soviet Union / Russia
- Education: Leningrad State University
- Scientific career
- Fields: Ichthyology; Zoogeography; Marine biology
- Workplaces: Leningrad State University; Sevastopol Biological Station; Russian Academy of Sciences; Russian Academy of Natural Sciences; American Society of Ichthyologists and Herpetologists

Anatoly Petrovich Andriyashev (Russian: Анатолий Петрович Андрияшев; 19 August 1910 – 4 January 2009) was a Soviet and Russian ichthyologist, marine biologist, and zoogeographist, notable for his studies of marine fauna of the Arctic and the Northern Pacific.

== Notable dates ==
- 1933 - graduated from the Biology Department of Leningrad State University (specialty - ichthyology)
- 1934 - took part in the Hydrobiological Expedition to the Sea of Japan of the Zoological Institute of the Russian Academy of Sciences
- 1937 - defended his thesis on "Zoogeography and origin of the fish fauna of the Bering Sea and adjacent waters," which was published in 1939 as a book.
- 1938 - 1939 - assistant, associate professor at Leningrad State University
- 1939 - 1943 - Senior Researcher at the Sevastopol Biological Station, then - an employee of the Zoological Institute of the Russian Academy of Sciences
- 1943-1946 - Scientific Secretary of the Zoological Institute of the Russian Academy of Sciences
  - from 1946 - Deputy Director for Science, then Senior Researcher, head of the Arctic and Antarctic Fish department
- 1951 - Doctor of Biological Sciences
- 1966 - Corresponding member of the Academy of Sciences of the Soviet Union (since 1991, Russian Academy of Sciences)
- 1994 - member of the Russian Academy of Natural Sciences

Andriyashev is an author of over 230 scientific papers.

== Research ==
Andriyashev focused on ichthyological research in the Far East and the Arctic seas, in the Antarctic and in the different regions of the Pacific, Indian and Atlantic Oceans.

Between 1962 and 1997 he was working to solve problems of biogeography and ecology, and of origins of amphiboreal, (Note: Pertaining to an interrupted northern circumpolar distribution.) amphi-Pacific (Note: Pertaining to the divided distribution in northern half of the Pacific Ocean.) and bipolar (Note: Pertaining to the interrupted distribution in temperate latitudes of the northern and southern hemispheres, but absent in the tropics.) distributions of aquatic organisms. In 1953 he worked on the concept of "ancient deep-water" (Note: When considering the evolutionary sequence of adaptation of fish to life in the deep sea, Andriyashev recognised two groups: "ancient" and "secondary" deep-water. He distinguished the two in terms of morphology, biology and distribution, without having to divide them strictly chronologically.) (primitive teleosts which evolved early and dominate the demersal to abysso- and bathypelagic faunas and whose structural adaptation to their habitat include eye and swim bladder modifications and proliferation of light organs e.g. Ceratioidei, Scopeliformes and Saccopharyngiformes) and "secondary deep-water" (representatives of a number of common families on the continental shelf with lesser external morphology as a result of later adaptation, e.g. Perciformes) species and, in 1964, on the zoogeographical zonation in the Arctic and Antarctic.

In 1990 he developed the hypothesis of transoceanic (Non-arctic) dispersal of "secondary deep-water" species of boreal-Pacific origin to the depths of the north Atlantic and the Arctic. In 1979 he studied the problem of vertical zonation salt-water benthic (Note: Of or relating to or happening on the bottom under a body of water) ichthyofauna; in 1986, the phenomenon of glacial submergence of the Antarctic ichthyofauna from the subtidal zone to depths of 300–600 metres; in 1970, the justification of the form of cryopelagic fish in ice-covered seas; and in 1997, the conception of bionomic bipolarity of marine life.

== Honours ==
- USSR State Prize (1971);
- L.S. Berg Academy Prize for his works on "Ichthyofauna in the Arctic and Antarctic (taxonomy, biogeography, origin)" (1992); (Note: http://www.kamchatsky-krai.ru/lichnosti/biografii/andriyashev.html states the year as 1991, but more sources point to 1992.)
- Honorary Arctic explorer of the USSR (1947);
- Honorary Foreign Member of American Society of Ichthyologists and Herpetologists (1968);
- Honorary Soros Professor (1994);
- Honorary Member of the Institute of Marine Biology, Far Eastern Branch of the Russian Academy of Sciences, (Vladivostok) (1999); (Note: http://www.kamchatsky-krai.ru/lichnosti/biografii/andriyashev.html states the year as 1996, but the reference specifically cited is associated directly with the Institution and states 1999.)
- Decorated by 5 orders of the USSR.

== Selected publications ==
- Andriyashev A.P., 1935. New data on deep-water fishes of the Bering Sea. Doklady Akademii Nauk SSSR [Comptes Rendus de l’Acade´mie des Sciences de l’URSS] IV(IX) (1-2):70-1 [In Russian; English summary]
- Andriyashev A.P., 1935. On a new fish of family Lycodapodidae from the north-east coast of Kamchatka. Doklady Akademii Nauk SSSR [Comptes Rendus de l’Acade´mie des Sciences de l’URSS], III (VIII)(9):422-4 [In Russian; English summary]
- Andriyashev A.P., 1935. Ubersicht der Gattung Stelgistrum Jordan und Gilbert (Pisces, Cottidae) nebst Beschreibung einer neuen Art aus dem Beringermeer. Zoologischer Anzeiger 3(11/12):289-97
- Andriyashev A.P., 1939. The fishes of the Bering Sea and neighbouring waters. Origin and zoogeography. Publ. Leningr. State Univ. 187 pp. [In Russian; English summary. English translation by Merrivale A]
- Andriyashev A.P., 1954. Fish fauna of the northern seas of USSR and its origin. Publ. Zool. Inst Acad. Sci. 566 pp. 300 fgs. [In Russian; English Translation: 1964 - Israel Program of Scientific Translations (836):1-617]
- Andriyashev, A.P., 1964. Fishes of the northern seas of the U.S.S.R. Israel Program for Scientific Translations, Jerusalem. 617 p. [Translated from Russian]
- Andriyashev A.P., 1965. A general review of the Antarctic fish fauna. In: Van Mieghem J, Van Ove P, editors. Biogeography and Ecology in Antarctica. Hague: Dr. W. Junk Publishers. p. 491-550
- Andriyashev A.P., 1967. A review of the plunder fishes of the genus Pogonophryne Regan (Harpagiferidae) with description of five new species from the East Antarctic and South Orkney Islands. Explorations of the fauna of the seas IV(XII). Biological results of the Soviet Antarctic Expedition (1955–1958) 3:389-412 [In Russian]
- Andriyashev, A.P., Lindberg, G.U., Legeza, M.I., Krasyukova, Z.V. 1967-1971. Fishes of the Sea of Japan and the adjacent areas of the Sea of Okhotsk and the Yellow Sea. Israel Program for Scientific Translations, Jerusalem.
- Andriyashev A.P., 1970. Cryopelagic fishes of the arctic and Antarctic and their significance in polar ecosystems. In: Holdgate MW, editor. Antarctic Ecology. New York: Academic Press. p. 297-304
- Andriyashev A.P., 1975. A new ultra-abyssal fish, Notoliparis kurchatovi gen. et sp. n. (Liparidae) from the South-Orkney Trench (Antarctic). Trudy Instituta Okeanologii Akademii Nauk SSSR (103):313-9
- Andriyashev A.P., 1977. Some additions to Schemes of the vertical zonation of marine bottom fauna. In: Llano GA, editor. Adaptations within Antarctic Ecosystems. Proceedings of 3rd SCAR Symposium on Antarctic Biology. Washington (1974):351-60
- Andriyashev A.P., 1978. On the third species of the ultra-abyssal genus Notoliparis Andr. (Pisces. Liparidae), from the deepwaters of the Macquarie Trench, with some notes on zoogeographic and evolutionary significance of this discovery. Trudy Instituta Okeanologii Akademii Nauk SSSR (112):152-161.
- Andriyashev A.P., 1979. On the occurrence of fishes belonging to the families Zoarcidae and Liparidae off the Kerguelen Island. Biologia Morya (Vladivostok) 5(6):28-34. [English translation in Soviet Journal of Marine Biology 5(6):481-6]
- Andriyashev, A.P., and A.V. Neyelov, 1979. New species of the genus Paraliparis (Liparidae) from the western Antarctic. J. Ichthyol. 19(1):7-15.
- Andriyashev A.P., 1982. A review of the genus Paraliparis (Liparidae) from the eastern Antarctic. Voprosy Ikhtiologii 22(4):531-542. [In Russian. English translation in Journal of Ichthyology 22(4):1-12].
- Andriyashev A.P., 1982. A new species and a new subspecies of Paraliparis (Liparidae) from western Antarctica. Voprosy Ikhtiologii 22 (2):179-186. [In Russian. English translation in Journal of Ichthyology 22(3):1-9]
- Andriyashev, A.P. and V.V. Fedorov, 1986. First discovery of Zoarcidae in New Zealand waters. J. Ichthyol. 26(1):136-144.
- Andriyashev, A.P., A.V. Balushkin and O.S. Voskoboynikova, 1989. Morphological validation of the subfamily Gymnodraconinae of the family Bathydraconidae. J. Ichthyol. 29(6):147-156.
- Andriyashev, A.P., 1990. On the probability of the transoceanic (North-Arctic) dispersal of secondary deepwater fish species of boreal-Pacific origin into the depths of the North Atlantic and Arctic Ocean (Family liparididae, as example). J. Ichthyol. 30(2):1-9.
- Andriyashev, A.P. and V.P. Prirodina, 1990. A review of Antarctic species of the genus Careproctus (Liparididae) and notes on the Carcinophilic species of this genus. J. Ichthyol. 30(6):63-76.
- Andriyashev, A.P., 1990. Remarks on the taxonomic status of the Antarctic species Paraliparis edentatus (Liparididae) and description of a new genus. J. Ichthyol. 30(2):60-66.
- Andriyashev, A.P., 1998. A new deep-sea species of the Careproctus genus (Liparidae, Scorpaeniformes) from the equatorial region of the Atakama Trench (Chile). J. Ichthyol. 38(7):541-542.
- Andriyashev, A.P., 1992. New species of Patagonian Liparidid fishes of the genus Careproctus (Scorpaeniformes, Liparididae). Report 2. J. Ichthyol. 32(1):38-49.
- Andriyashev, A.P. and N.V. Chernova, 1989. A new species of the genus Careproctus (Liparidae) from the four-kilometer depth of the Porcupine Depression (Northeastern Atlantic). J. Ichthyol. 29(5):94-98.
- Andriyashev, A.P., 1993. The validity of the genus Psednos Barnard (Scorpaeniformes, Liparidae) and its antitropical distribution area. J. Ichthyol. 33(5):81-98.
- Andriyashev, A.P., 1994. On the quadruped locomotion of Zanclorhynchus spinifer (Scorpaeniformes, Congiopodidae). J. Ichthyol. 34(2):149-155.
- Andriyashev, A.P., 1994. Review of Liparidae (Scorpaeniformes) from Subantarctic islands of the Indian Ocean, with a description of a new species of Paraliparis. J. Ichthyol. 34(8):1-9.
- Andriyashev, A.P., 1994. The restoration of the validity of the forgotten species Amitra liparina Goode, 1881, with a description of new species, similar to it, Paraliparis challengeri sp. n.(Scorpaeniformes, Liparidae), from the porcupine seabight (Northeast Atlantic). J. Ichthyol. 34(2):1-7.
- Andriyashev, A.P. and N.V. Chernova, 1995 Annotated list of fishlike vertebrates and fish of the arctic seas and adjacent waters. J. Ichthyol. 35(1):81-123.

== List of taxa of invertebrates and fish, named in honour of A.P. Andriyashev ==
=== Monogenea ===
- Gyrodactylidae: Gyrodactyloides andriaschewi Bychowsky et Poljansky, 1953. (Barents Sea, Okhotsk Sea; on Mallotus villosus villosus, M. villosus socialis).

=== Spongia ===
- Theneidae: Cladothenia andriashevi Koltun, 1964.

=== Amphipoda ===
- Pontogeneiidae: Pontogenea andrijashevi Gurjanova, 1951.

=== Isopoda ===
- Ischnomedidae: Ishnomesus andriashevi Birstein, 1960.

=== Tanaidacea ===
- Paratanaidae: Arthrura andriashevi Kudinova-Pasternak, 1967. (Family: Tanaellidae; superfamily: Paratanaoidea).

=== Pisces ===
- Achiropsettidae: Pseudomancopsetta andriashevi Evseenko, 1984.
- Bathylagidae: Bathylagus andriashevi Kobylansky, 1986.
- Cetomimidae: Gyrinomimus andriashevi Fedorov, Balushkin et Trunov, 1987.
- Congridae: Gnathophis andriashevi Karmovskaya, 1990.
- Cottidae: Andriashevicottus megacephalus Fedorov, 1990.
- Cyclopteridae: Eumicrotremus (orbis) andriashevi Perminov, 1936.
- Harpagiferidae: Harpagifer andriashevi Prirodina, 2000.
- Ipnopidae: Bathypterois andriashevi Sulak et Shcherbachev, 1988.
- Liparidae: Osteodiscus andriashevi Pitruk et Fedorov, 1990; Paraliparis andriashevi Stein et Tompkins, 1989; Psednos andriashevi Chernova, 2001.
- Macrouridae: Idiolophorhynchus andriashevi Sazonov, 1981.
- Moridae: Physiculus andriashevi Shcherbachev, 1993.
- Myctophidae: Protomyctophum andriashevi Becker, 1963.
- Ogcocephalidae: Haleutopsis andriashevi Bradbury, 1988.
- Phosichthyidae: Polymetme andriashevi Parin et Borodulina, 1990.
- Rajidae: Bathyraja andriashevi Dolganov, 1985.
- Synanceiidae: Minous andriashevi Mandritza, 1990.
- Salmonidae: Salvelinus andriashevi Berg, 1948.
- Zoarcidae: Andriashevia aptera Fedorov et Neelov, 1978; Lycodes andriashevi Fedorov, 1966.

== Taxon described by him ==
- See Category:Taxa named by Anatoly Andriyashev
