= Heidolph =

Laboratory equipment manufacturer

- Heidolph Log
- Industry: Laboratory Equipment
- Founded: 1938, as a manufacturer of precision drive motors
- Headquarters: Schwabach, Germany
- Products: Specializing in Rotary Evaporation, Shakers, OH Stirrers, Peristaltic Pumps, and Magnetic Hotplates Stirrers.
- Number of employees: 250+ (2010)
- Website: http://www.heidolph.com/

Heidolph Instruments GmbH & Co. KG, situated in Schwabach, Bavaria, Germany, is a manufacturing company specialising in laboratory equipment. The company is noted in Die Deutsche Wirtschaft database as being foreign-owned by a parent company, Allied Motion Technologies, based in the United States of America, and serves a global market.

As of April 2023, the company is reported to operate under the management of Andreas Hahn. It operates in 100 countries, including South Korea, the USA, and Shanghai, selling equipment to laboratories in the pharmaceutical research, cosmetics, biology, biofuel and chemical industries, and also to universities worldwide.

In August 2024, the company entered into an agreement with ATS Life Sciences for ATS to acquire all material assets from the company. The agreement is subject to closing condition and is projected to complete by the end of the third quarter of 2024.

== Business ==
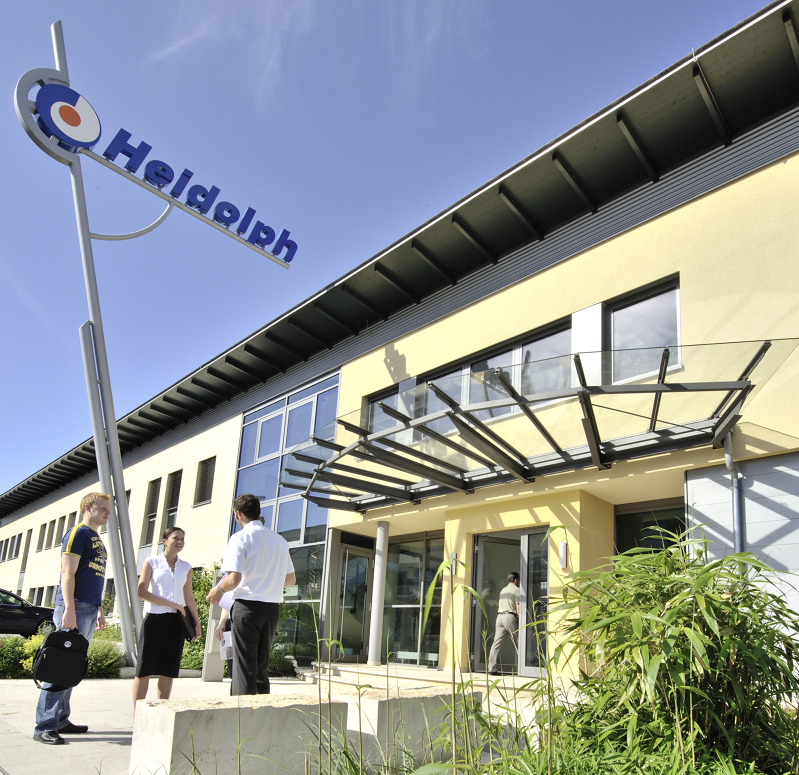
Schwabach, Germany

Heidolph Instruments, founded in 1938 as a manufacturer of precision drive motors and engineering, is a manufacturer of laboratory equipment specializing in rotary evaporation, shakers, overhead stirrers, peristaltic pumps and magnetic hotplate stirrers. The organization is headquartered in Schwabach, a city in proximity to Nuremberg, Germany. It is there that the development and production of equipment; as well as the coordination of sales, and customer support activities are located.

In August 2024, Heidolph Instruments entered into an agreement with ATS Life Sciences, under which ATS will acquire the business. The transaction is expected to complete in the third calendar quarter of 2024, pending the fulfillment of standard closing conditions.

== Product Divisions ==
The company's product portfolio includes devices for evaporations, stirring, automation, shaking, mixing, and liquid handling. Used in various scientific and research applications.

=== Rotary Evaporators ===
Heidolph Rotary evaporators are used for standard distillation, crystallization, product concentration, powder drying, and separation of one or several solvents. Rotary evaporators are now being used in more and more laboratory kitchens as well. The relationship between the pressure and vapor temperature of a selection of solvents should be considered when distilling. The temperature difference between the vapor temperature and cooling medium should be at 20C to result in sufficient condensation. The temperature difference between the heating bath and vapor temperature should be at 20C to reach a sufficient distillation rate.

=== Magnetic Stirrers ===
Heidolph magnetic stirrers are used for smooth to intense mixing of low-viscosity fluids. Depending on the application, they are able to mix and heat at the same time.

=== Overhead Stirrers ===
Overhead Stirrers or laboratory stirrers, not to be confused with magnetic stirrers, are used for standard mixing of the higher viscosity substances. They essentially are mixers, used for suspending, gas intrusion and recirculation. Companies and scientists alike use these for mixing paint chemicals used on cars to mixing shampoos and conditioner components. The torque, stirring capacity and viscosity max should be reviewed when picking out the correct stirrer for your application.

=== Shakers and Mixers ===
This line is used for mixing and heating small or large wells in biology, microbiology, medical diagnosis, and biochemistry. There are 6 separate motions including vibrating, orbital, reciprocal, wave, rocking, and overhead. A variety of motions are used for shaking samples, cultivation cells, to sample separation. Accessories may be needed depending on the scientist's application and compound sizes.

=== Vortexers ===
Vortexers are ideal for mixing samples in Eppendorf tubes, vials, and similar vessels of different diameters at extremely high-speed rates. The ridged mixing orbit yields consistent results and is ideal for product dissolution.

=== Peristaltic Pumps ===
Peristaltic pumps are ideal for pumping corrosive, viscous, and abrasive materials. Different tubing sizes and materials allow for numerous applications. Peristaltic pumps are generally used in the pharmaceutical, biotechnology, and food pilot plant industries, and research laboratories.

=== Sterilizers ===
Tuttnauer has been designing and manufacturing a wide range of sterilizers for more than 90 years.

== Subsidiaries and affiliated businesses ==
- Heidolph Instruments Verwaltungs GmbH
- ZINNVA Holding GmbH & Co. KG
- ZINNVA Holding Verwaltungs GmbH
- Heidolph NA LLC
  - Supports and services Heidolph Tuttnauer Autoclaves. Heidolph Radleys synthesis tools, along with their complete line of Heidolph products. The organization's headquarters is located just outside of Chicago, IL.
- Heidolph North America (formerly Heidolph Brinkmann LLC)
  - A subsidiary of Heidolph GmbH, founded as Heidolph Brinkmann LLC in 2008.
- Heidolph & Zinsser GmbH
- Hans Heidolph GmbH

== Company Management ==
- 1994-April 2023, Managing Director, Wolfgang Jaenicke retired.
- April 2023 – present Managing Director, Andreas Hahn
- Chief Financial Officer (CFO), Jürgen Pirthauer

== Awards ==
- Heidolph Instruments' Hei-TORQUE series received the prestigious iF Design Award.

== Media and Film ==
=== In fiction ===
- Heidolph Rotary Evaporators can be seen in the 2012 comedy The 5 Year Engagement and the 2012 comic based movie The Avengers during the lab scene on the ship.
- Heidolph Laborota evaporator and Modular concept shaker was shown several times in the 2009 Sci- Fi movie, Splice. The evaporator can be seen in the lab scene when Sarah Polley is doing research.
- In Avatar, a 2009 American epic science fiction film, the Heidolph rotary evaporator is used in one of their many laboratories.
- The rotary evaporator can be seen in the I Am Legend movie, in the basement of Will Smith's protected home lab.
