= Liparis tunicatus =

Scientific classification
- Domain: Eukaryota
- Kingdom: Animalia
- Phylum: Chordata
- Class: Actinopterygii
- Order: Perciformes
- Suborder: Cottoidei
- Family: Liparidae
- Genus: Liparis
- Species: L. tunicatus

Binomial name
- Liparis tunicatus J. C. H. Reinhardt, 1836

Species of fish

Liparis tunicatus, or the kelp snailfish, is a species of snailfish from the genus Liparis. It can be found in marine, demersal waters at a depth range from 0 to 620 m (0–2,034 ft). The kelp snailfish lives in the Arctic and Northwest Atlantic Ocean among kelp. The species is common, at least around Greenland and Franz Josef Land. A bottom feeder, it eats small crustaceans. At Franz Josef Land, it spawns in March at a depth of 6–25 m (20–82 ft), with the egg clusters attached to kelp.

The kelp snailfish is among the northernmost living species in its family, together with species like Liparis bathyarcticus and L. fabricii.

== Description ==
The fish grows to a maximum total length of about 16.5 cm (6.5 in). It has small dark spots and can have pale stripes. Liparis tunicatus has a small gill opening. It is sometimes confused with juveniles of the related L. gibbus.
