= Rotary evaporator =

Device used in chemical laboratories

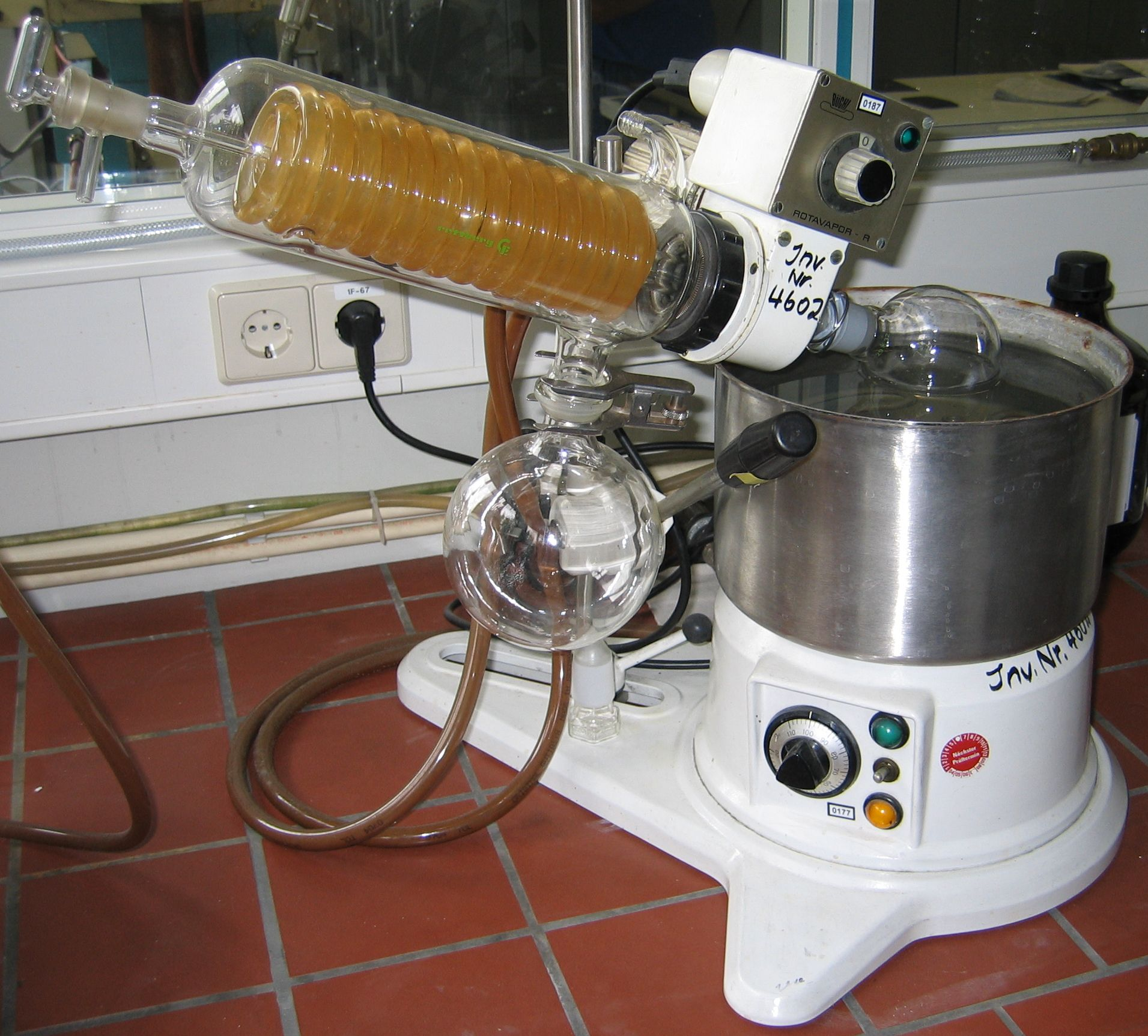
- Other names: Rotovap
- Uses: Solvent evaporation
- Inventor: Lyman C. Craig

A rotary evaporator (rotovap) is a device used in chemical laboratories for the efficient and gentle removal of solvents from samples by evaporation. When referenced in the chemistry research literature, description of the use of this technique and equipment may include the phrase "rotary evaporator", though use is often rather signaled by other language (e.g., "the sample was evaporated under reduced pressure").

Rotary evaporators are also used in molecular cooking for the preparation of distillates and extracts.

A simple rotary evaporator system was invented by Lyman C. Craig. It was first commercialized by the Swiss company Büchi in 1957. The device separates substances with different boiling points, and greatly simplifies work in chemistry laboratories. In research the most common size accommodates round-bottom flasks of a few liters, whereas large scale (20- to 50-liter) versions are used in pilot plants in commercial chemical operations.

== Design ==
The main components of a rotary evaporator are:

1. A motor unit that rotates the evaporation flask or vial containing the user's sample.
2. A vapor duct that is the axis for sample rotation, and is a vacuum-tight conduit for the vapor being drawn off the sample.
3. A vacuum system, to substantially reduce the pressure within the evaporator system.
4. A heated fluid bath (generally water) to heat the sample.
5. A condenser with either a coil passing coolant, or a "cold finger" into which coolant mixtures such as dry ice and acetone are placed.
6. A condensate-collecting flask at the bottom of the condenser, to catch the distilling solvent after it re-condenses.
7. A mechanical or motorized mechanism to quickly lift the evaporation flask from the heating bath.

The vacuum system used with rotary evaporators can be as simple as a water aspirator with a trap immersed in a cold bath (for non-toxic solvents), or as complex as a regulated mechanical vacuum pump with refrigerated trap. Glassware used in the vapor stream and condenser can be simple or complex, depending upon the goals of the evaporation, and any propensities the dissolved compounds might give to the mixture (e.g., to foam or "bump"). Commercial instruments are available that include the basic features, and various traps are manufactured to insert between the evaporation flask and the vapor duct. Modern equipment often adds features such as digital control of vacuum, digital display of temperature and rotational speed, and vapor temperature sensing.

== Theory ==
Vacuum evaporators as a class function because lowering the pressure above a bulk liquid lowers the boiling points of the component liquids in it. Generally, the component liquids of interest in applications of rotary evaporation are research solvents that one desires to remove from a sample after an extraction, such as following a natural product isolation or a step in an organic synthesis. Liquid solvents can be removed without excessive heating of what are often complex and sensitive solvent-solute combinations.

Rotary evaporation is most often and conveniently applied to separate "low boiling" solvents such a n-hexane or ethyl acetate from compounds which are solid at room temperature and pressure. However, careful application also allows removal of a solvent from a sample containing a liquid compound if there is minimal co-evaporation (azeotropic behavior), and a sufficient difference in boiling points at the chosen temperature and reduced pressure.

Solvents with higher boiling points such as water (100 °C at standard atmospheric pressure, 760 torr or 1 bar), dimethylformamide (DMF, 153 °C at the same), or dimethyl sulfoxide (DMSO, 189 °C at the same), can also be evaporated if the unit's vacuum system is capable of sufficiently low pressure. (For instance, both DMF and DMSO will boil below 50 °C if the vacuum is reduced from 760 torr to 5 torr [from 1 bar to 6.6 mbar]) However, more recent developments are often applied in these cases (e.g., evaporation while centrifuging or vortexing at high speeds). Rotary evaporation for high boiling hydrogen bond-forming solvents such as water is often a last recourse, as other evaporation methods or freeze-drying (lyophilization) are available. This is partly due to the fact that in such solvents, the tendency to "bump" is accentuated. The modern centrifugal evaporation technologies are particularly useful when one has many samples to do in parallel, as in medium- to high-throughput synthesis now expanding in industry and academia.

Evaporation under vacuum can also, in principle, be performed using standard organic distillation glassware — i.e., without rotation of the sample. The key advantages in use of a rotary evaporator are

1. That the centrifugal force and the frictional force between the wall of the rotating flask and the liquid sample result in the formation of a thin film of warm solvent being spread over a large surface.
2. The forces created by the rotation suppress bumping. The combination of these characteristics and the conveniences built into modern rotary evaporators allow for quick, gentle evaporation of solvents from most samples, even in the hands of relatively inexperienced users. Solvent remaining after rotary evaporation can be removed by exposing the sample to even deeper vacuum, on a more tightly sealed vacuum system, at ambient or higher temperature (e.g., on a Schlenk line or in a vacuum oven).

A key disadvantage in rotary evaporations, besides its single sample nature, is the potential of some sample types to bump, e.g. ethanol and water, which can result in loss of a portion of the material intended to be retained. Even professionals experience periodic mishaps during evaporation, especially bumping, though experienced users become aware of the propensity of some mixtures to bump or foam, and apply precautions that help to avoid most such events. In particular, bumping can often be prevented by taking homogeneous phases into the evaporation, by carefully regulating the strength of the vacuum (or the bath temperature) to provide for an even rate of evaporation, or, in rare cases, through use of added agents such as boiling chips (to make the nucleation step of evaporation more uniform). Rotary evaporators can also be equipped with further special traps and condenser arrays that are best suited to particular difficult sample types, including those with the tendency to foam or bump.

== Safety ==
Possible hazards include implosions resulting from use of glassware that contains flaws, such as star-cracks. Explosions may occur from concentrating unstable impurities during evaporation, for example when rotavapping an ethereal solution containing peroxides. This can also occur when taking certain unstable compounds, such as organic azides and acetylides, nitro-containing compounds, molecules with strain energy, etc. to dryness.

Users of rotary evaporation equipment must take precautions to avoid contact with rotating parts, particularly entanglement of loose clothing, hair, or necklaces. Under these circumstances, the winding action of the rotating parts can draw the users into the apparatus resulting in breakage of glassware, burns, and chemical exposure. Extra caution must also be applied to operations with air reactive materials, especially when under vacuum. A leak can draw air into the apparatus and a violent reaction can occur.

== See also ==
- Vapor pressure
- Centrifugal evaporator
