= Liparis zonatus =

Scientific classification
- Kingdom: Animalia
- Phylum: Chordata
- Class: Actinopterygii
- Order: Perciformes
- Suborder: Cottoidei
- Family: Liparidae
- Genus: Liparis
- Species: L. zonatus

Binomial name
- Liparis zonatus Chernova, Stein & Andriashev, 2004

Species of fish

Liparis zonatus is a fish from the genus Liparis. It may be found in the Northwest Pacific Ocean in the Yellow Sea, Dalian, and south Liao Dong Wan. The fish's depth ranges from 58 to 910 meters.
