= Metastability =

Intermediate energetic state within a dynamical system

A metastable state of weaker bond (1), a transitional "saddle" configuration (2) and a stable state of stronger bond (3).

In chemistry and physics, metastability is an intermediate energetic state within a dynamical system other than the system's state of least energy. A ball resting in a hollow on a slope is a simple example of metastability. If the ball is only slightly pushed, it will settle back into its hollow, but a stronger push may start the ball rolling down the slope. Bowling pins show similar metastability by either merely wobbling for a moment or tipping over completely. A common example of metastability in science is isomerisation. Higher energy isomers are long lived because they are prevented from rearranging to their preferred ground state by (possibly large) barriers in the potential energy.

During a metastable state of finite lifetime, all state-describing parameters reach and hold stationary values. In isolation:

- the state of least energy is the only one the system will inhabit for an indefinite length of time, until more external energy is added to the system (unique "absolutely stable" state);
- the system will spontaneously leave any other state (of higher energy) to eventually return (after a sequence of transitions) to the least energetic state.

The metastability concept originated in the physics of first-order phase transitions. It then acquired new meaning in the study of aggregated subatomic particles (in atomic nuclei or in atoms) or in molecules, macromolecules or clusters of atoms and molecules. Later, it was borrowed for the study of decision-making and information transmission systems.

Metastability is common in physics and chemistry – from an atom (many-body assembly) to statistical ensembles of molecules (viscous fluids, amorphous solids, liquid crystals, minerals, etc.) at molecular levels or as a whole (see Metastable states of matter and grain piles below). The abundance of states is more prevalent as the systems grow larger and/or if the forces of their mutual interaction are spatially less uniform or more diverse.

In dynamic systems (with feedback) like electronic circuits, signal trafficking, decisional, neural and immune systems, the time-invariance of the active or reactive patterns with respect to the external influences defines stability and metastability (see brain metastability below). In these systems, the equivalent of thermal fluctuations in molecular systems is the "white noise" that affects signal propagation and the decision-making.

== Statistical physics and thermodynamics ==
Non-equilibrium thermodynamics is a branch of physics that studies the dynamics of statistical ensembles of molecules via unstable states. Being "stuck" in a thermodynamic trough without being at the lowest energy state is known as having kinetic stability or being kinetically persistent. The particular motion or kinetics of the atoms involved has resulted in getting stuck, despite there being preferable (lower-energy) alternatives.

=== States of matter ===
Metastable states of matter (also referred as metastates) range from melting solids (or freezing liquids), boiling liquids (or condensing gases) and sublimating solids to supercooled liquids or superheated liquid-gas mixtures. Extremely pure, supercooled water stays liquid below 0 °C and remains so until applied vibrations or condensing seed doping initiates crystallization centers. This is a common situation for the droplets of atmospheric clouds.

=== Condensed matter and macromolecules ===
Metastable phases are common in condensed matter and crystallography. This is the case for anatase, a metastable polymorph of titanium dioxide, which despite commonly being the first phase to form in many synthesis processes due to its lower surface energy, is always metastable, with rutile being the most stable phase at all temperatures and pressures. As another example, diamond is a stable phase only at very high pressures, but is a metastable form of carbon at standard temperature and pressure. It can be converted to graphite (plus leftover kinetic energy), but only after overcoming an activation energy – an intervening hill. Martensite is a metastable phase used to control the hardness of most steel. Metastable polymorphs of silica are commonly observed. In some cases, such as in the allotropes of solid boron, acquiring a sample of the stable phase is difficult.

The bonds between the building blocks of polymers such as DNA, RNA, and proteins are also metastable. Adenosine triphosphate (ATP) is a highly metastable molecule, colloquially described as being "full of energy" that can be used in many ways in biology.

Generally speaking, emulsions/colloidal systems and glasses are metastable. The metastability of silica glass, for example, is characterised by lifetimes on the order of 10^{98} years (as compared with the lifetime of the universe, which is thought to be around 1.3787×10^{10} years).

Sandpiles are one system which can exhibit metastability if a steep slope or tunnel is present. Sand grains form a pile due to friction. It is possible for an entire large sand pile to reach a point where it is stable, but the addition of a single grain causes large parts of it to collapse.

The avalanche is a well-known problem with large piles of snow and ice crystals on steep slopes. In dry conditions, snow slopes act similarly to sandpiles. An entire mountainside of snow can suddenly slide due to the presence of a skier, or even a loud noise or vibration.

== Quantum mechanics ==
Aggregated systems of subatomic particles described by quantum mechanics (quarks inside nucleons, nucleons inside atomic nuclei, electrons inside atoms, molecules, or atomic clusters) are found to have many distinguishable states. Of these, one (or a small degenerate set) is indefinitely stable: the ground state or global minimum.

All other states besides the ground state (or those degenerate with it) have higher energies. Of all these other states, the metastable states are the ones having lifetimes lasting at least 10^{2} to 10^{3} times longer than the shortest lived states of the set.

A metastable state is then long-lived (locally stable with respect to configurations of 'neighbouring' energies) but not eternal (as the global minimum is). Being excited – of an energy above the ground state – it will eventually decay to a more stable state, releasing energy. Indeed, above absolute zero, all states of a system have a non-zero probability to decay; that is, to spontaneously fall into another state (usually lower in energy). One mechanism for this to happen is through tunnelling.

=== Nuclear physics ===
Some energetic states of an atomic nucleus (having distinct spatial mass, charge, spin, isospin distributions) are much longer-lived than others (nuclear isomers of the same isotope), e.g. technetium-99m. The isotope tantalum-180m, although being a metastable excited state, is long-lived enough that it has never been observed to decay, with a half-life calculated to be least 2.9×10^{17} (290 quadrillion) years, over 21 million times the current age of the universe.

=== Atomic and molecular physics ===
Some atomic energy levels are metastable. Rydberg atoms are an example of metastable excited atomic states. Transitions from metastable excited levels are typically those forbidden by electric dipole selection rules. This means that any transitions from this level are relatively unlikely to occur. In a sense, an electron that happens to find itself in a metastable configuration is trapped there. Since transitions from a metastable state are not impossible (merely less likely), the electron will eventually decay to a less energetic state, typically by an electric quadrupole transition, or often by non-radiative de-excitation (e.g., collisional de-excitation).

This slow-decay property of a metastable state is apparent in phosphorescence, the kind of photoluminescence seen in glow-in-the-dark toys that can be charged by first being exposed to bright light. Whereas spontaneous emission in atoms has a typical timescale on the order of 10^{−8} seconds, the decay of metastable states can typically take milliseconds to minutes, and so light emitted in phosphorescence is usually both weak and long-lasting.

=== Chemistry ===
In chemical systems, a system of atoms or molecules involving a change in chemical bond can be in a metastable state, which lasts for a relatively long period of time. Molecular vibrations and thermal motion make chemical species at the energetic equivalent of the top of a round hill very short-lived. Metastable states that persist for many seconds (or years) are found in energetic valleys which are not the lowest possible valley (point 1 in illustration). A common type of metastability is isomerism.

The stability or metastability of a given chemical system depends on its environment, particularly temperature and pressure. The difference between producing a stable vs. metastable entity can have important consequences. For instances, having the wrong crystal polymorph can result in failure of a drug while in storage between manufacture and administration. The map of which state is the most stable as a function of pressure, temperature and/or composition is known as a phase diagram. In regions where a particular state is not the most stable, it may still be metastable. Reaction intermediates are relatively short-lived, and are usually thermodynamically unstable rather than metastable. The IUPAC recommends referring to these as transient rather than metastable.

Metastability is also used to refer to specific situations in mass spectrometry and spectrochemistry.

== Electronic circuits ==
A digital circuit is supposed to be found in a small number of stable digital states within a certain amount of time after an input change. However, if an input changes at the wrong moment a digital circuit which employs feedback (even a simple circuit such as a flip-flop) can enter a metastable state and take an unbounded length of time to finally settle into a fully stable digital state.

== Computational neuroscience ==
Metastability in the brain is a phenomenon studied in computational neuroscience to elucidate how the human brain recognizes patterns. Here, the term metastability is used rather loosely. There is no lower-energy state, but there are semi-transient signals in the brain that persist for a while and are different than the usual equilibrium state.

== In philosophy ==
Gilbert Simondon invokes a notion of metastability for his understanding of systems that rather than resolve their tensions and potentials for transformation into a single final state rather, 'conserves the tensions in the equilibrium of metastability instead of nullifying them in the equilibrium of stability' as a critique of cybernetic notions of homeostasis.

== See also ==
- False vacuum
- Hysteresis
- Metastate
