= Liparis dubius =

Scientific classification
- Domain: Eukaryota
- Kingdom: Animalia
- Phylum: Chordata
- Class: Actinopterygii
- Order: Perciformes
- Suborder: Cottoidei
- Family: Liparidae
- Genus: Liparis
- Species: L. dubius

Binomial name
- Liparis dubius Soldatov, 1930

Species of snailfish

Liparis dubius is a species of snailfish found in the northwestern Pacific Ocean. Distribution includes the Sea of Japan and Sea of Okhotsk.
