= Liparis brashnikovi =

Scientific classification
- Kingdom: Animalia
- Phylum: Chordata
- Class: Actinopterygii
- Order: Perciformes
- Suborder: Cottoidei
- Family: Liparidae
- Genus: Liparis
- Species: L. brashnikovi

Binomial name
- Liparis brashnikovi Soldatov, 1930

Species of fish

Liparis brashnikovi is a fish from the genus Liparis. The fish grows to a maximum of 15 cm (in total length). It is a marine fish that lives in the demersal zone. Distribution includes the Sea of Japan in the Northwest Pacific Ocean.
