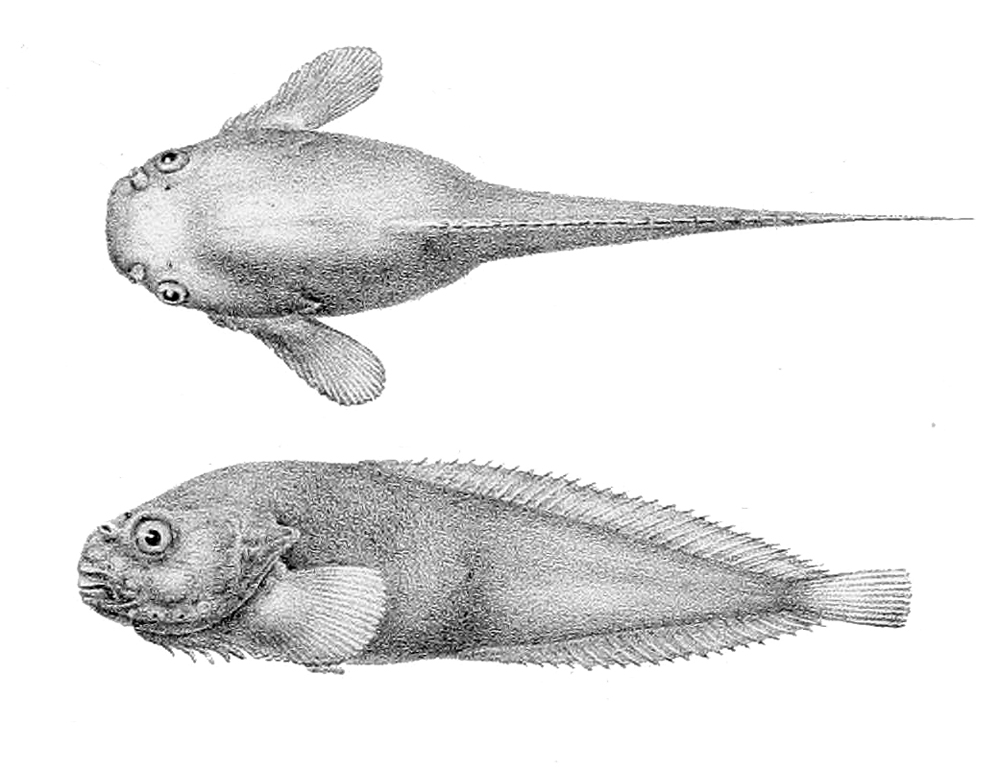

Scientific classification
- Kingdom: Animalia
- Phylum: Chordata
- Class: Actinopterygii
- Order: Perciformes
- Suborder: Cottoidei
- Family: Liparidae
- Genus: Liparis
- Species: L. antarcticus

Binomial name
- Liparis antarcticus Putnam, 1874

= Liparis antarcticus =

Species of fish

Liparis antarcticus is a species of marine ray-finned fish belonging to the family Liparidae, the snailfishes. This species lives in the demersal zone and can be found in the Southeast Pacific Ocean by Chile, and it is the only known species from the genus Liparis to live in the Southern Hemisphere. L. antarcticus is known only from its holotype, and the type locality of Eden Harbor in Ultima in southern Chile, may be stated in error and the specimen may have been collected off California.
