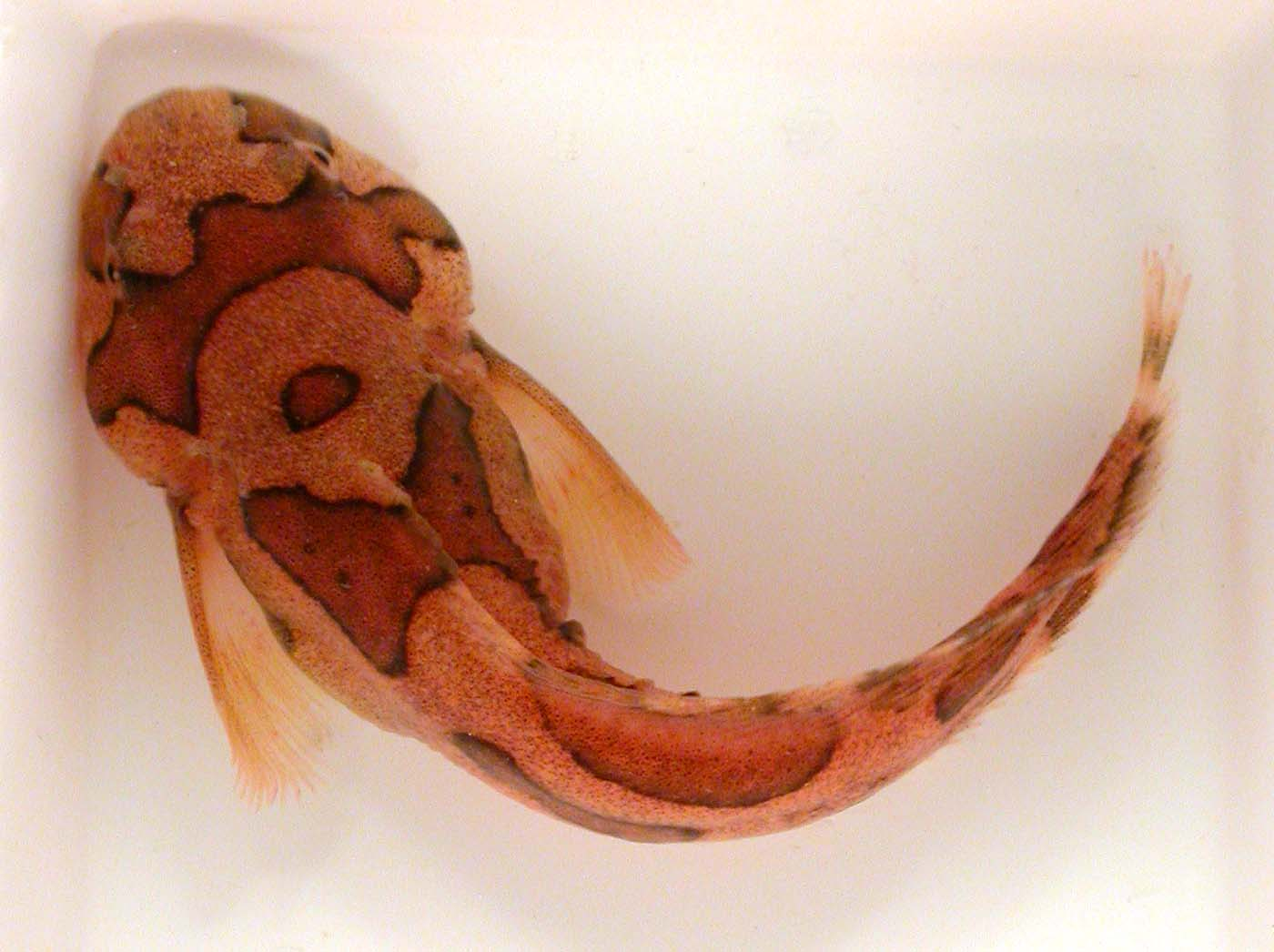

Scientific classification
- Kingdom: Animalia
- Phylum: Chordata
- Class: Actinopterygii
- Order: Perciformes
- Suborder: Cottoidei
- Family: Liparidae
- Genus: Liparis
- Species: L. marmoratus

Binomial name
- Liparis marmoratus Schmidt, 1950

= Liparis marmoratus =

Species of fish

Liparis marmoratus, or the festive snailfish, is a marine ray-finned fish from the genus Liparis. It was first described by Schmidt in 1950.

== Description ==
Liparis marmoratus is colored light brown to yellow and has dark brown to reddish spots on its body as well as its median fins. Its body is described as slender but not humpbacked. The festive snailfish's head is wide and has a depression. The head's width is nearly equal to its depth. The mouth is small, with its cleft extending merely below the posterior nostril. Its teeth are trilobed, and each lobe is equally sized. Its upper jaw is slightly longer than its lower jaw. The snout is practically horizontal and blunt at the tip. The fish's chin pores are small and set closely to one another. The festive snailfish's gill opening is also small.

== Distribution and habitat ==
Liparis marmoratus is considered a rare species, especially because of identification issues. Its depth ranges from 96 to 165 meters. It may be found in the North Pacific Ocean, specifically in the northern Sea of Okhotsk by Sakhalin Island and Gizhiginskaya Bay as well as the Bering Sea by St. Lawrence Island.
