= Superheating =

Heating a liquid to a temperature above its boiling point without boiling

In thermodynamics, superheating (sometimes referred to as boiling retardation, or boiling delay) is the phenomenon in which a liquid is heated to a temperature higher than its boiling point, without boiling. This is a so-called metastable state or metastate, where boiling might occur at any time, induced by external or internal effects. Superheating is achieved by heating a homogeneous substance in a clean container, free of nucleation sites, while taking care not to disturb the liquid.

This may occur by microwaving water in a very smooth container. Disturbing the water may cause an unsafe eruption of hot water and result in burns.

== Cause ==
For boiling to occur, the vapor pressure must exceed the ambient pressure plus a small amount of pressure induced by surface tension.

Water is said to "boil" when bubbles of water vapor grow without bound, bursting at the surface. For a vapor bubble to expand, the temperature must be high enough that the vapor pressure exceeds the ambient pressure (the atmospheric pressure, primarily). Below that temperature, a water vapor bubble will shrink and vanish.

Superheating is an exception to this simple rule; a liquid is sometimes observed not to boil even though its vapor pressure does exceed the ambient pressure. The cause is an additional force, the surface tension, which suppresses the growth of bubbles.

Surface tension makes the bubble act like an elastic balloon. The pressure inside is raised slightly by the "skin" attempting to contract. For the bubble to expand, the temperature must be raised slightly above the boiling point to generate enough vapor pressure to overcome both surface tension and ambient pressure.

What makes superheating so explosive is that a larger bubble is easier to inflate than a small one; just as when blowing up a balloon, the hardest part is getting started. It turns out the excess pressure $\Delta p$ due to surface tension is inversely proportional to the diameter $d$ of the bubble. That is, $\Delta p \propto d^{-1}$.

This can be derived by imagining a plane cutting a bubble into two halves. Each half is pulled towards the middle with a surface tension force $F \propto \pi d$, which must be balanced by the force from excess pressure $\Delta p \times (\pi d^2/4)$. So we obtain $\Delta p (\pi d^2/4) \propto \pi d$, which simplifies to $\Delta p \propto d^{-1}$.

This means if the largest bubbles in a container are small, only a few micrometres in diameter, overcoming the surface tension may require a large $\Delta p$, requiring exceeding the boiling point by several degrees Celsius. Once a bubble does begin to grow, the surface tension pressure decreases, so it expands explosively in a positive feedback loop. In practice, most containers have scratches or other imperfections which trap pockets of air that provide starting bubbles, and impure water containing small particles can also trap air pockets. Only a smooth container of purified liquid can reliably superheat.

== Occurrence via microwave oven ==
Superheating can occur when an undisturbed container of water is heated in a microwave oven. At the time the container is removed, the lack of nucleation sites prevents boiling, leaving the surface calm. However, once the water is disturbed, some of it violently flashes to steam, potentially spraying boiling water out of the container. The boiling can be triggered by jostling the cup, inserting a stirring device, or adding a substance like instant coffee or sugar. The chance of superheating is greater with smooth containers, because scratches or chips can house small pockets of air, which serve as nucleation points. Superheating is more likely after repeated heating and cooling cycles of an undisturbed container, as when a forgotten coffee cup is re-heated without being removed from a microwave oven. This is due to heating cycles releasing dissolved gases such as oxygen and nitrogen from the solvent. There are ways to prevent superheating in a microwave oven, such as putting a spoon or stir stick (note that it is unsafe to use metal utensils for this purpose) into the container beforehand or using a scratched container. To avoid a dangerous sudden boiling, it is recommended not to microwave water for an excessive amount of time.

== Superheating in solids ==
Although superheating is most often discussed for liquids, crystalline solids can also be transiently superheated above their equilibrium melting point. Early theoretical work suggested an upper bound of roughly three times the melting temperature, sometimes referred to as an "entropy catastrophe," beyond which a solid would be thermodynamically unstable relative to the liquid phase.

Subsequent experimental studies have reported solids persisting above this limit under ultrafast heating. Thin gold films, for example, were observed to remain crystalline for more than two picoseconds when heated at rates up to ~10^{15} K s^{−1}, corresponding to temperatures of nearly 14 times the melting point. This persistence has been attributed to the extreme heating rate and to the lattice's inability to expand on picosecond timescales.

== Applications ==
Superheating of hydrogen liquid is used in bubble chambers.

== See also ==
- Autoclave
- Boiling chip
- Bumping (chemistry)
- Critical point (thermodynamics)
- Pumice
- Supercooling
- Supersaturation
- Subcooling
