= Liparis alboventer =

Scientific classification
- Kingdom: Animalia
- Phylum: Chordata
- Class: Actinopterygii
- Order: Perciformes
- Suborder: Cottoidei
- Family: Liparidae
- Genus: Liparis
- Species: L. alboventer

Binomial name
- Liparis alboventer Krasyukova, 1984

Species of fish

Liparis alboventer is a species of marine ray-finned fish belonging to the family Liparidae, the snailfishes The species was originally described Careproctus alboventer by Zoya Valentinovna Krasyukova in 1984. Very little is known about the fish except from the type specimens caught. It may be found in marine habitats at ten degrees Celsius in the South Kuril Strait of the Northwest Pacific.
