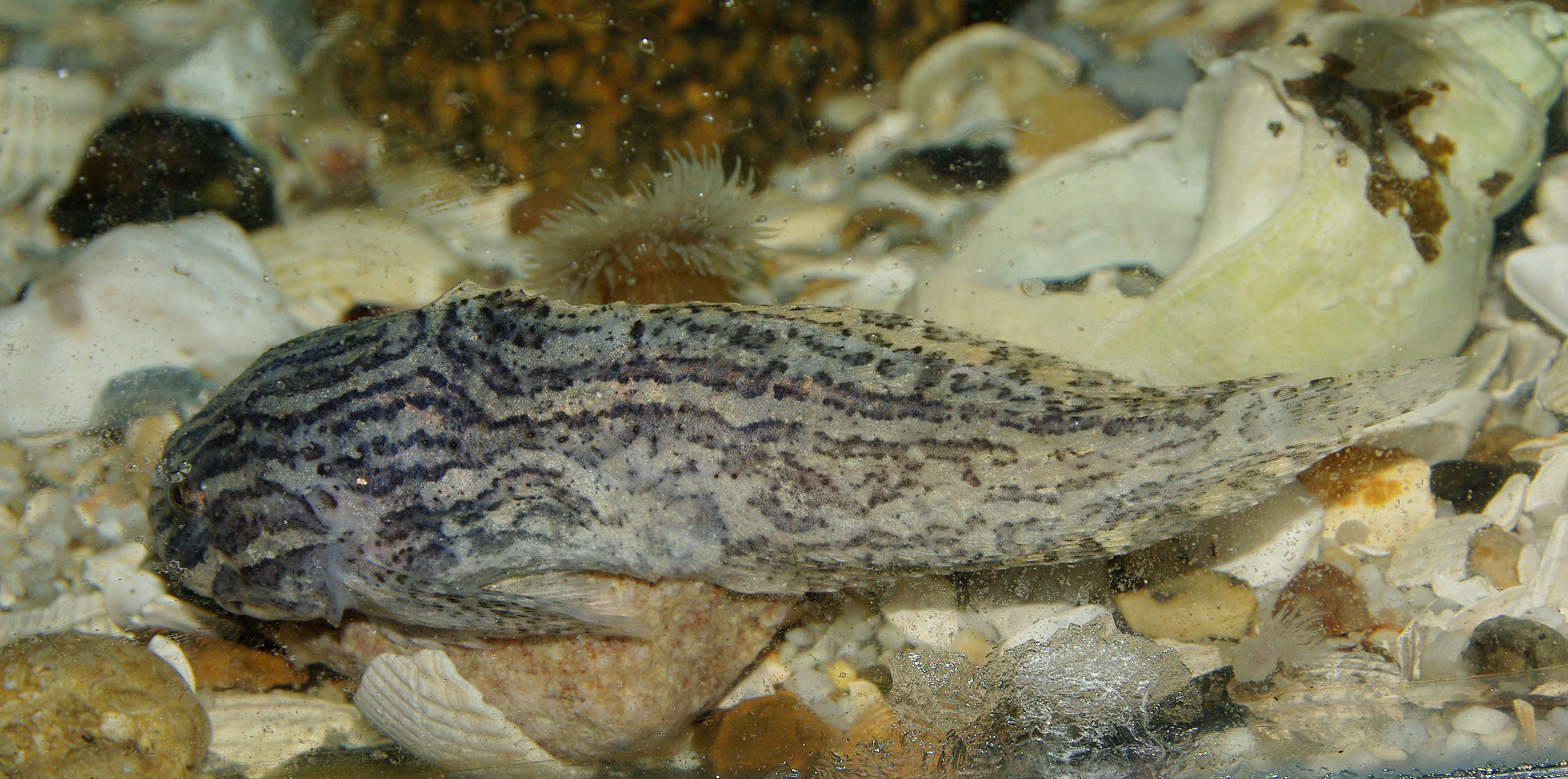

Conservation status
- Least Concern (IUCN 3.1)

Scientific classification
- Kingdom: Animalia
- Phylum: Chordata
- Class: Actinopterygii
- Division: Teleostei
- Order: Perciformes
- Suborder: Cottoidei
- Family: Liparidae
- Genus: Liparis
- Species: L. liparis

Binomial name
- Liparis liparis (Linnaeus, 1766)

Synonyms
- Cyclopterus liparis Linnaeus, 1766; Liparis liparis liparis (Linnaeus, 1766); Cyclopterus lineatus Lepechin, 1774; Liparis vulgaris Fleming, 1828; Cyclopterus liparoides Nilsson, 1832; Liparis lineatus Krøyer, 1847; Liparis lineatus var. multistriata Lütken, 1862; Liparis stellatus Malm, 1865; Liparis lineatus var. assimilis Collett, 1879; Liparis lineatus var. subfuscus Collett, 1879; Liparis lineatus var. scorpioides Collett, 1879; Liparis lineatus var. mixus Collett, 1879; Liparis lineatus var. decorus Collett, 1879; Liparis lineatus var. scriptus Collett, 1879; Liparis lineatus var. fuscus Collett, 1879

= Liparis liparis =

Species of fish

Liparis liparis, the common seasnail, striped seasnail or seasnail, is a small species of marine ray-finned fish belonging to the family Liparidae, the snailfishes, in the order Scorpaeniformes, the scorpionfishes and flatheads. It is found in the northeastern Atlantic Ocean where it lives on the seabed.

== Taxonomy ==
Liparis liparis was first formally described in 1766 as Cyclopterus liparis by Carl Linnaeus with its type locality given as the North Sea off County Durham in England. In 1777 Giovanni Scopoli proposed the genus Liparis with Cyclopterus liparis as its only species although it was not designated as the type species until 1898 when David Starr Jordan and Barton Warren Evermann officially designated C. liparis as the type species of the genus.

== Etymology ==
Liparis liparis is a tautonym with liparis meaning "sleek-skinned" in Greek, an allusion to the smooth skin of this fish, lacking scales.

== Description ==
Liparis liparis is an unusual-looking fish with a large head and front part of the body and a laterally compressed posterior part of the body and large fringing fins. Its length is generally between 8 and 14 cm (3.1 and 5.5 in). The bony head has two pairs of nostrils on the snout. The pectoral fins are very large and unite beneath the body. The pelvic fins take the form of a large sucking disc located between the pectorals. The dorsal fin has 27 to 36 soft rays and both it and the anal fins overlap the caudal fin. The skin is slimy and lacks scales.

== Distribution ==
Liparis liparis is native to the northeastern Atlantic Ocean as far east as the Barents Sea, Novaya Zemlya, Spitsbergen and Bear Island and as far south as the British Isles. It is also present in the Baltic Sea and North Sea, the waters around Iceland and Greenland and as far west as the Gulf of Maine. Its depth range is from 5 m (16 ft) to 300 m (984 ft) and it lives near the seabed in inshore waters.

== Biology ==
Liparis liparis feeds on small crustaceans, such as shrimps, crabs and amphipods, and also polychaete worms and fish. It breeds in the winter in the southern part of its range and in spring in the northern part. The eggs are laid on the seabed amongst short algae or hydroids. The eggs hatch in 6–8 weeks and the larvae are pelagic, forming part of the plankton.
