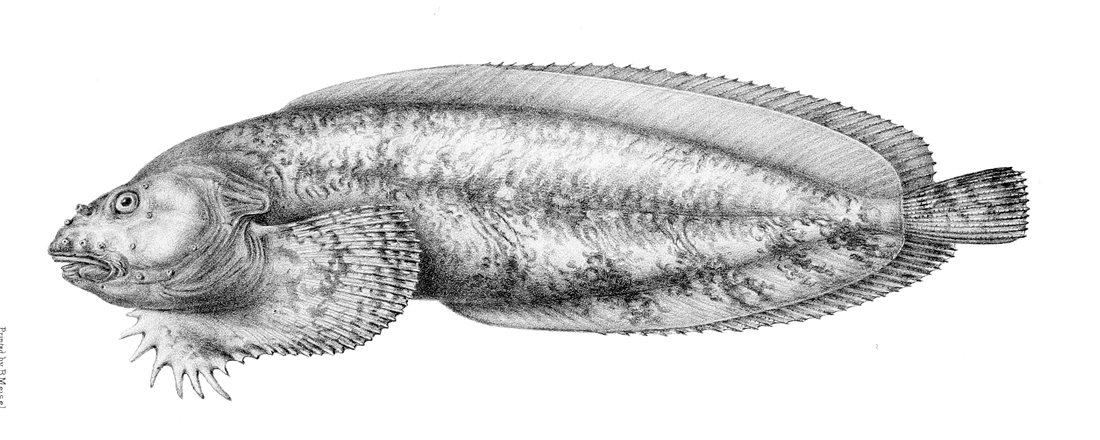

Scientific classification
- Kingdom: Animalia
- Phylum: Chordata
- Class: Actinopterygii
- Order: Perciformes
- Suborder: Cottoidei
- Family: Liparidae
- Genus: Liparis
- Species: L. agassizii

Binomial name
- Liparis agassizii Putnam, 1874

= Liparis agassizii =

Species of fish

Liparis agassizii, in one instance called "Agassiz's snailfish", is a species of marine ray-finned fish belonging to the family Liparidae, the snailfishes. It lives in the North Pacific Ocean at a depth range between zero and one hundred meters. The fish may especially be found from the Iwate Prefecture to Hokkaido, off the coast of Primorskiy, off the western and southeastern coast of Sakhalin, and in the southern Kuril Islands.

The specific epithet agassizii honours Louis Agassiz.

== Description ==
The fish's body may be brown, gray, or blackish, with either a striped, speckled, mottled, or plain pattern. It grows to a maximum length of 44 cm (TL).
