= Richard G. Palmer =

British theoretical physicist

Richard G. Palmer (born 28 January 1949, in Reigate) is a British theoretical physicist. (He is a US immigrant with permanent residency status.)

Palmer received a B.A. in theoretical physics (1st Class) from the University of Cambridge in 1970 and a PhD in condensed matter theory in 1973, under the supervision of P. W. Anderson, with a thesis entitled Theory of nuclear matter in neutron stars. In 1971–1973 he was supported by a Lord Kelvin Research Fellowship. He was in 1973–1975 an instructor and in 1975–1977 a lecturer at Princeton University. He was in 1977–1983 an assistant professor, in 1983–1991 an associate professor, and from 1991 to the present a full professor of physics at Duke University. At Duke, he was also in 1992–1995 a professor of experimental psychology, in 1999–2002 a professor of psychology and brain sciences, and in 1993–1999 a professor of computer science. He was a member of the external faculty of the Santa Fe Institute in 1989–2003.

Palmer "is currently working on theories of statistical mechanics. He is interested in the application and development of statistical physics methods for many types of complex systems, including glasses and spin glasses, neural networks, genetic algorithms, and economic markets. The long-term goal of his work is to establish firm theoretical foundations for understanding the emergence of structure, complexity, and computational ability in driven systems of interacting adaptive components."

Palmer was an Alfred P. Sloan Fellow for the two academic years 1979–1981 and a Guggenheim Fellow for the academic year 1980–1981. He won the Duke Endowment Award for Excellence in Teaching for the academic year 1980–1981.

== Selected publications ==
=== Articles ===
- "Solidification Pressure of Nuclear and Neutron Star Matter", P.W. Anderson and R.G. Palmer, Nature Phys. Sci. 231, 145 (1971). doi:10.1038/physci231145a0
- "Exact Solution of the Mean Spherical Model for Charged Hard Sphere in a Uniform Neutralizing Background", R.G. Palmer and J.D. Weeks, J. Chem. Phys. 58, 4171 (1973).doi:10.1063/1.1678973
- "Are Neutron Star Cores Pion Condensates or Quantum Crystals?", R.G. Palmer, E. Tosatti, and P.W. Anderson, Nature Phys. Sci. 245, 119 (1973). doi:10.1038/physci245119a0
- "Corresponding States Approach to Nuclear and Neutron-Star Matter", R.G. Palmer and P.W. Anderson, Phys. Rev. D9, 3281 (1974). doi:10.1103/PhysRevD.9.3281
- "Positively Charged Isopin Wave Softening and Proton Lattice in Neutron Stars", P.W. Anderson, N. Itoh, M.A. Alpar, E. Tosatti, and R.G. Palmer, Lettere al Nuovo Cimento 12, 165 (1975). doi:10.1007/BF02785970
- "Neutron Star Cores", R.G. Palmer, Astrophys. Space Sci. 34, 209 (1975). doi:10.1007/BF00646761
- "The Replica Method and a Solvable Spin Glass Model", J.L. van Hemmen and R.G. Palmer, J. Phys. A 12, 563 (1979). doi:10.1088/0305-4470/12/4/016
- "Internal Field Distributions in Model Spin Glasses", R.G. Palmer and C.M. Pond, J. Phys. F 9, 1451 (1979). doi:10.1088/0305-4608/9/7/024
- "Solution of 'Solvable Model of a Spin Glass' ", D.J. Thouless, P.W. Anderson, and R.G. Palmer, Phil. Mag. 35, 593 (1977). doi:10.1080/14786437708235992
- "Charged Hard Sphere Results for the One-Component Plasma", R.G. Palmer, J. Chem. Phys. 73, 2009 (1980). doi:10.1063/1.440295
- "Magnetic Properties of a Model Spin Glass and the Failure of Linear Response Theory", F.T. Bantilan and R.G. Palmer, J. Phys. F 11, 261 (1981). doi:10.1088/0305-4608/11/1/026
- "Ground State Properties of a Spin Glass Model", A.J. Kolan and R.G. Palmer, J. Appl. Phys. Phys. 53, 2198 (1982). doi:10.1063/1.330972
- "The Thermodynamic Limit and the Replica Method for Short-range Random Systems", J.L. van Hemmen and R.G. Palmer, J. Phys. A 15, 3881 (1982). doi:10.1088/0305-4470/15/12/037
- "Broken Ergodicity", R.G. Palmer, Adv. Phys. 31, 669 (1982). doi:10.1080/00018738200101438
- " 'Unlearning' has a Stabilizing Effect in Collective Memories", J.J. Hopfield, D.I. Feinstein, and R.G. Palmer, Nature 304, 158 (1983). doi:10.1038/304158a0
- "Models of Hierarchically Constrained Dynamics for Glassy Relaxation", R.G. Palmer, D.L. Stein, E. Abrahams, and P.W. Anderson, Phys. Rev. Lett. 53, 958 (1984). doi:10.1103/PhysRevLett.53.958
  - Erratum, Phys. Rev. Lett. 54, 1965 (1985). doi:10.1103/PhysRevLett.54.1965
- "Nature of the Glass Transition", D.L. Stein and R.G. Palmer, Phys. Rev. B 38, 12035 (1988). doi:10.1103/PhysRevB.38.12035
- "Mean Exit Times over Fluctuating Barriers", D.L. Stein, R.G. Palmer, J.L. van Hemmen, and C.R. Doering, Phys. Lett. A136, 353 (1989). doi:10.1016/0375-9601(89)90414-3
- "Artificial Economic Life: a Simple Model of a Stockmarket", R.G. Palmer, W.B. Arthur, J.H. Holland, B. LeBaron, and P.J. Tayler, Physica D75, 264–274 (1994). doi:10.1016/0167-2789(94)90287-9

=== Books ===
- Introduction to the Theory of Neural Computation, J.A. Hertz, A.S. Krogh, and R.G. Palmer, (Addison-Wesley, Redwood City, 1991).
- Models of Extinction, M.E.J. Newman and R.G. Palmer, (Oxford University Press, 2002).
