= Liparis bikunin =

Scientific classification
- Domain: Eukaryota
- Kingdom: Animalia
- Phylum: Chordata
- Class: Actinopterygii
- Order: Perciformes
- Suborder: Cottoidei
- Family: Liparidae
- Genus: Liparis
- Species: L. bikunin

Binomial name
- Liparis bikunin Matsubara & Iwai, 1954

Species of fish

Liparis bikunin is a fish from the genus Liparis. A marine fish, it lives in the Northwest Pacific Ocean by Kushiro, Japan. It is also considered a demersal fish.
