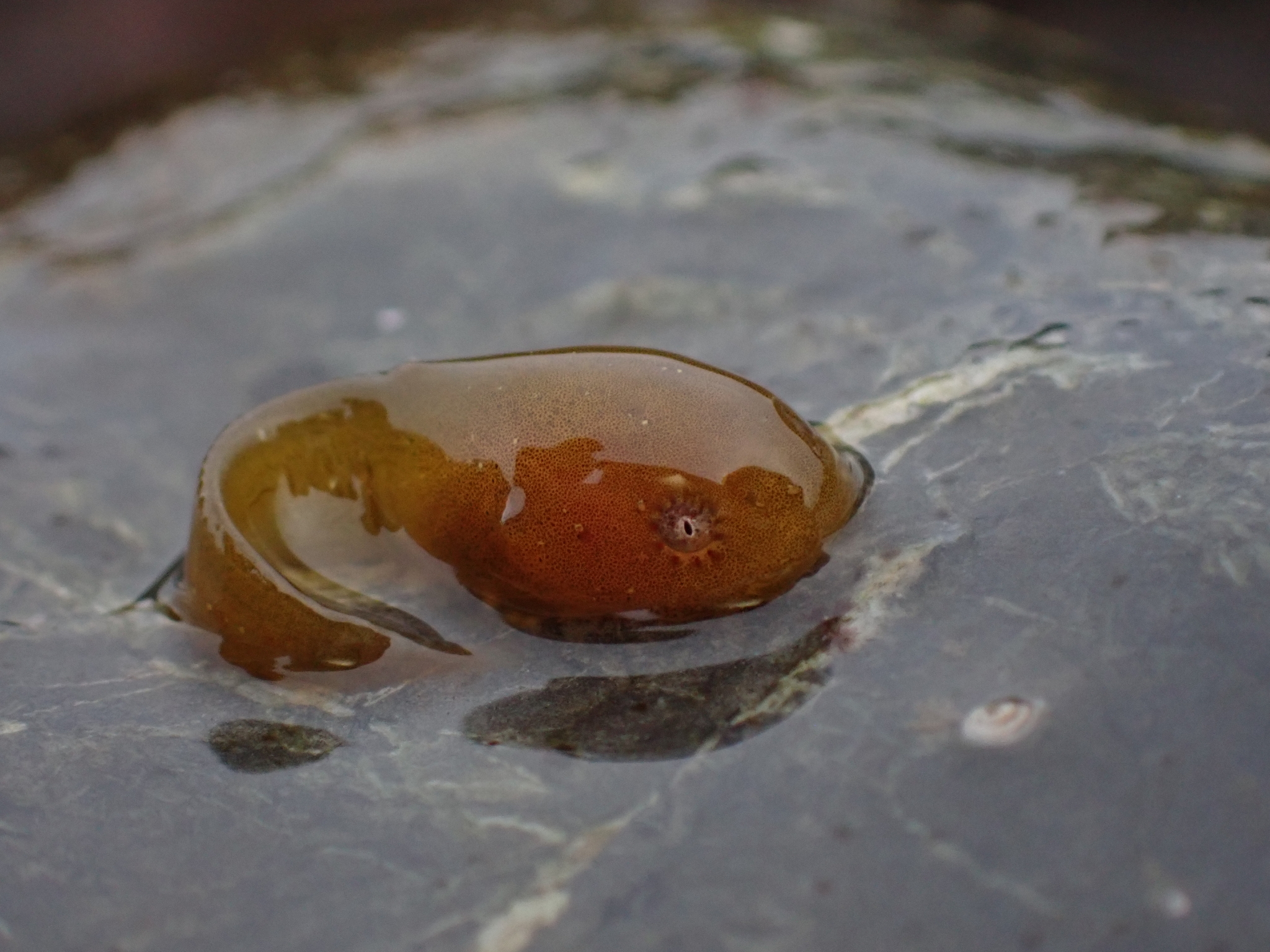

Scientific classification
- Kingdom: Animalia
- Phylum: Chordata
- Class: Actinopterygii
- Order: Perciformes
- Suborder: Cottoidei
- Family: Liparidae
- Genus: Liparis
- Species: L. florae

Binomial name
- Liparis florae (D. S. Jordan & Starks, 1895)

= Liparis florae =

Species of fish

Liparis florae, the tidepool snailfish, is a marine snailfish of the genus Liparis. It was first described as Neoliparis florae by Jordan and Starks in 1895 and occurs between Alaska and California.
