= Metastate =

Probability measure in thermodynamics

In statistical mechanics, the metastate is a probability measure on the space of all thermodynamic states for a system with quenched randomness. The term metastate, in this context, was first used by Charles M. Newman and Daniel L. Stein in 1996.

Two different versions have been proposed:

1) The Aizenman-Wehr construction, a canonical ensemble approach, constructs the metastate through an ensemble of states obtained by varying the random parameters in the Hamiltonian outside of the volume being considered.

2) The Newman-Stein metastate, a microcanonical ensemble approach, constructs an empirical average from a deterministic (i.e., chosen independently of the randomness) subsequence of finite-volume Gibbs distributions.

It was proved for Euclidean lattices that there always exists a deterministic subsequence along which the Newman-Stein and Aizenman-Wehr constructions result in the same metastate. The metastate is especially useful in systems where deterministic sequences of volumes fail to converge to a thermodynamic state, and/or there are many competing observable thermodynamic states.

As an alternative usage, "metastate" can refer to thermodynamic states, where the system is in a metastable state (for example superheated or undercooled liquids, when the actual temperature of the liquid is above or below the boiling or freezing temperature, but the material is still in a liquid state).
