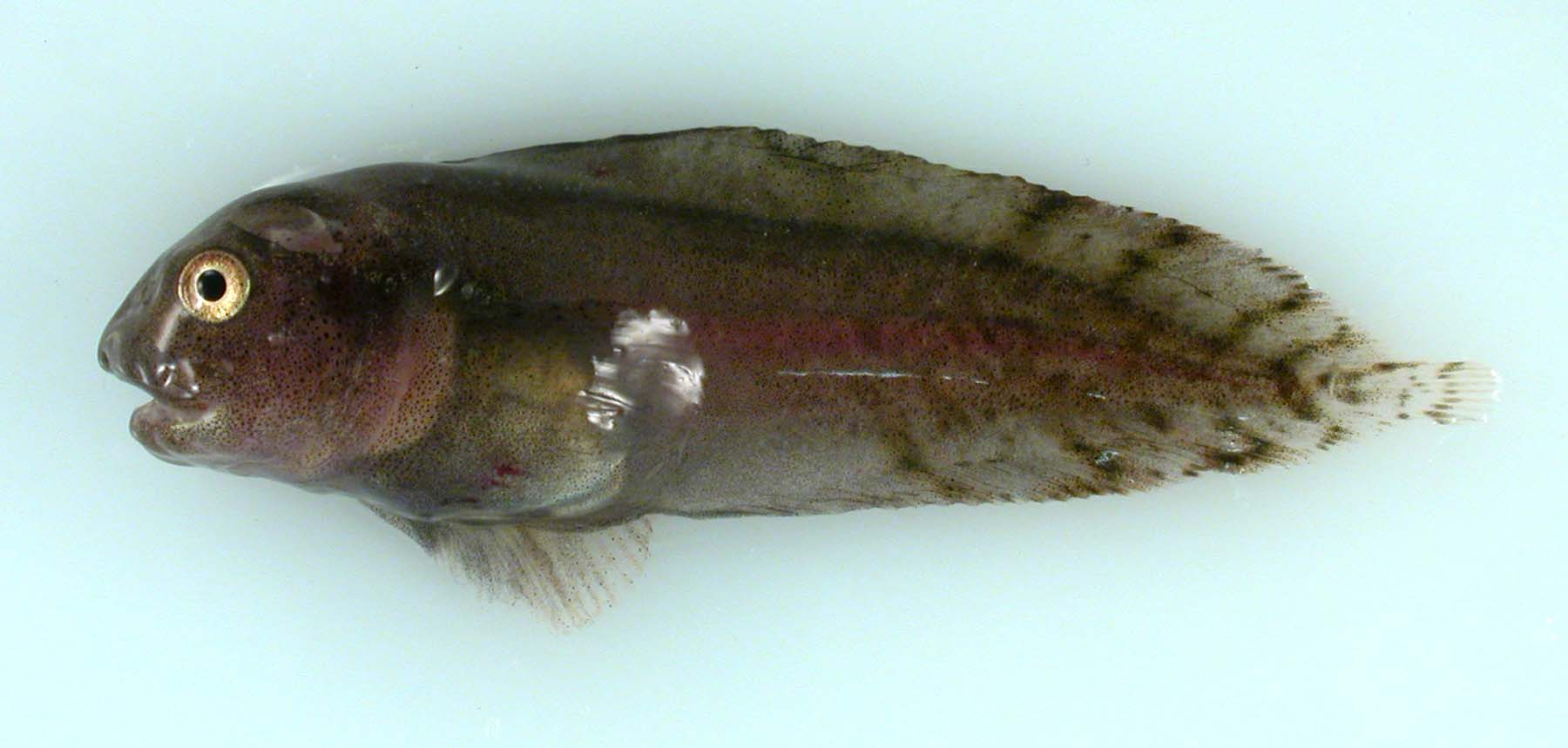
- Liparis fabricii from the Bering Strait and Chukchi Sea area

Scientific classification
- Kingdom: Animalia
- Phylum: Chordata
- Class: Actinopterygii
- Division: Teleostei
- Order: Perciformes
- Suborder: Cottoidei
- Family: Liparidae
- Genus: Liparis
- Species: L. fabricii

Binomial name
- Liparis fabricii Krøyer, 1847

Synonyms
- Liparis koefoedi Parr, 1931; Liparis laptevi Popov, 1933

= Liparis fabricii =

Gelatinous seasnail Liparis fabricii

Species of fish

Liparis fabricii, commonly known as the gelatinous seasnail or gelatinous snailfish, is a benthopelagic species of snailfish from the Arctic Ocean. It has a tadpole-like body with a maximum length of about 20 cm (7.9 in). It is brown to black in coloration with a distinctive dark peritoneum. It preys on small crustaceans and marine worms. It is not commercially important, though it is a valuable food source for predatory fish and seabirds in the Arctic region.

== Description ==
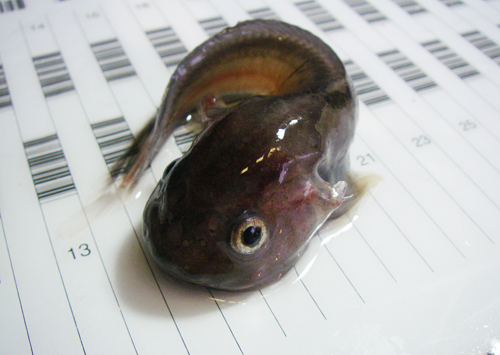
A juvenile Liparis fabricii from the Beaufort Sea

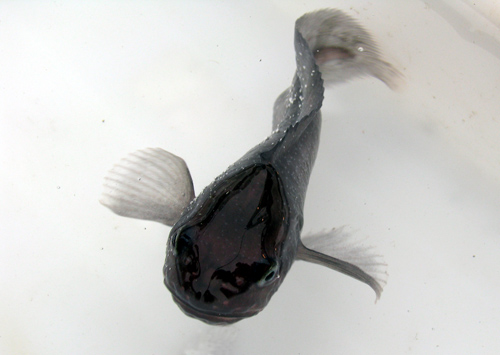
Living specimen of Liparis fabricii from the Beaufort Sea

Liparis fabricii grows to a total length of up to 20 cm (7.9 in). The shape of its body resembles that of a tadpole, with a large rounded head and abdomen tapering towards a narrow tail. Two nasal pores are present on each side of the head. The eyes are relatively large, with orbital diameters of 5.3 to 10.3% of the total body length. The mouth is shaped into a suction disc and has simple unlobed teeth. The peritoneum of L. fabricii is distinctively dark, visible in both the interior of the mouth and behind the gill covers. When alive, the peritoneum also has some silvery markings, but once dead and preserved these rapidly disappear, making it appear all dark.

The pectoral fins are large with the tip reaching the anal fin. The pelvic fins located just below the pectorals are modified into a suction disc. Both the anal and the single dorsal fin are very large, arising from around the middle of the body to where they overlap the small rounded caudal fin. The number of soft rays on the anal fin ranges from 37 to 42, distinguishing them from other species of snailfish which usually only have 36. The dorsal fin has 45 to 50 rays.

The body of L. fabricii is smooth and completely scaleless. Like its common name suggests, its skin is somewhat gelatinous in texture and tears easily. L. fabricii is lighter colored when young, with the pigment cells (melanophores) visible as brownish speckles just under the skin. As the fish matures, the number of pigment cells increases until the fish becomes almost entirely black in adulthood. Males also develop small bumps upon reaching sexual maturity.

L. fabricii can be distinguished from other snailfishes by its dark peritoneum and by the number of soft rays on its anal fin. Although the dark peritoneum is unique among Arctic snailfish, L. fabricii as presently defined is a complex that comprises several species that all have it (some of these have scientific names that can be resurrected, but others remain undescribed).

== Taxonomy and nomenclature ==
Liparis fabricii was first scientifically described in 1847 by the Danish zoologist Henrik Nikolai Krøyer. It was named after Otto Fabricius, who mentioned it (without formally naming it) in Fauna Groenlandica from 1780. It is classified under the genus Liparis of the snailfish family Liparidae.

The species is known under the common names of gelatinous seasnail and gelatinous snailfish in English. It is also known as dökki sogfiskur in Icelandic, Fabricius ringbug in Danish, and limace gélatineuse in French.

== Distribution and habitat ==
Among snailfishes, Liparis fabricii, Liparis bathyarcticus and Liparis tunicatus (the kelp snailfish) are the three species with the northernmost distribution range.

Liparis fabricii lives in the circumpolar Arctic regions in waters with temperatures below 0 °C (32 °F). It has been recorded from the Barents Sea, Beaufort Sea, Kara Sea, East Siberian Sea, Chukchi Sea, White Sea, Bering Sea, Hudson Bay, Baffin Bay and the northernmost region of the North Atlantic. It is a benthopelagic species and can be found at depths of 5 to 1,800 m (16 to 5,906 ft); from just beneath the pack ice in open water to deep in the ocean bottom. It usually prefers muddy substrates at depths of about 50 to 100 m (160 to 330 ft), although adults often are seen over silty sand bottoms with stones, commonly near kelp, at depths of 10–25 m (33–82 ft) in Franz Josef Land. The species is common, at least around Greenland and at Franz Josef Land.

== Ecology ==
Liparis fabricii preys on small benthic and pelagic invertebrates, mainly crustaceans (usually hyperiid amphipods) and marine worms. It uses its disc-shaped mouth to suck up prey from the ocean floor and water column. It is an important food source for various predatory fish and seabirds.

Little is known of the biology of Liparis fabricii. The spawning season is during summer and autumn. Females lay 485 to 735 eggs each. The eggs are large, with diameters of 2.1 to 2.7 mm (0.083 to 0.106 in). The larvae are pelagic. Based on trawl surveys where many hundred have been caught in a relatively short period, L. fabricii likely occurs in schools.

== Importance ==
Liparis fabricii is not commercially fished, but it is a common bycatch in Arctic fishing.

== See also ==
- Deep sea fish
- Demersal fish
- Arctic Ocean Diversity
