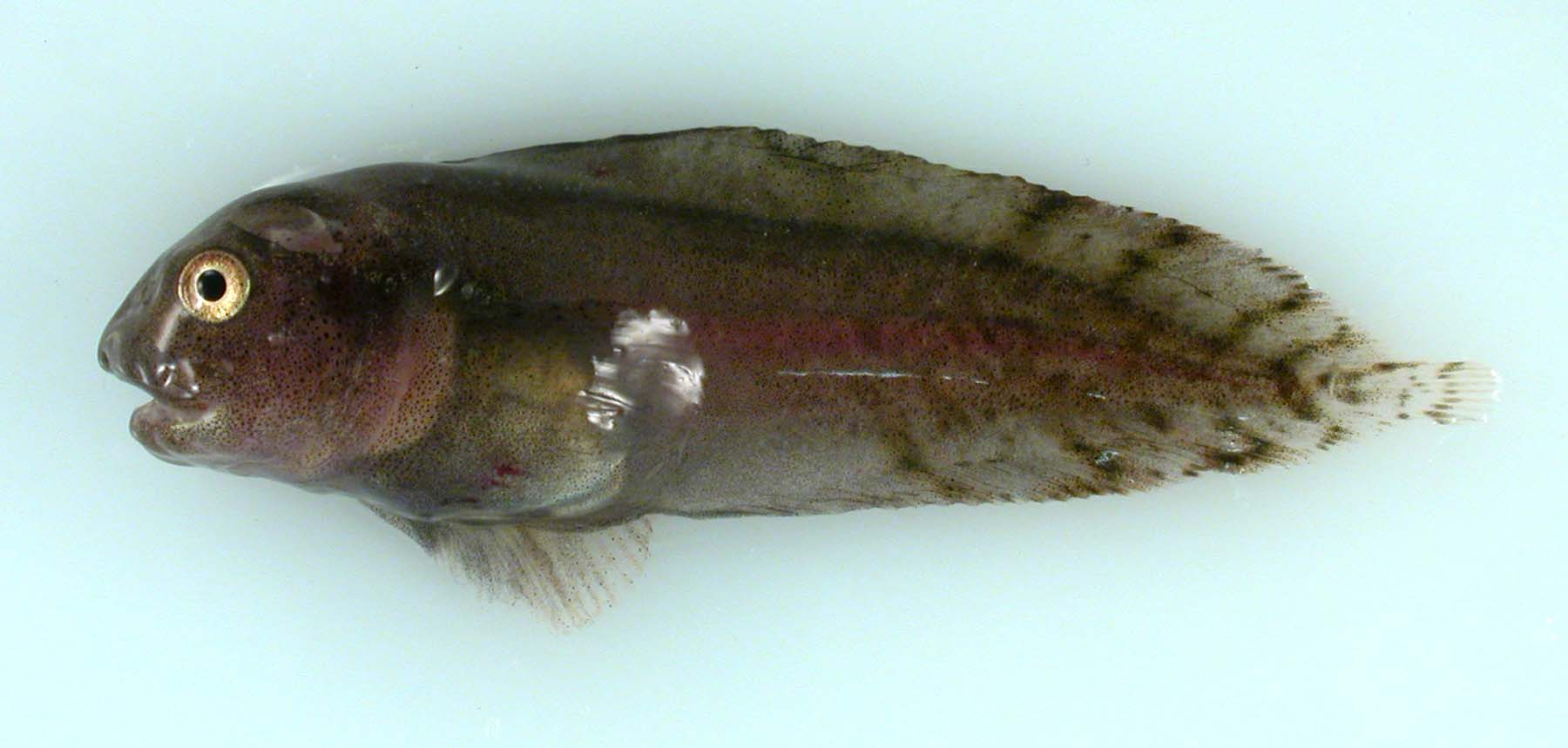
- The gelatinous seasnail (Liparis fabricii)

Scientific classification
- Kingdom: Animalia
- Phylum: Chordata
- Class: Actinopterygii
- Order: Perciformes
- Suborder: Cottoidei
- Family: Liparidae
- Genus: Liparis; Scopoli, 1777

Type species
- Cyclopterus liparis Linnaeus, 1766

Species
- See text.

Synonyms
- Cyclogaster Gronow, 1763; Lycocara Gill, 1884; Neoliparis Steindachner, 1875; Massaria Gistel, 1848; Lyoliparis Jordan & Evermann, 1896; Careliparis Garman, 1892; Actinochir Gill, 1864; Trismegistus Jordan & Snyder, 1904

= Liparis (fish) =

Genus of fishes

Liparis is a large genus of snailfish from the Northern Hemisphere. They are very common in temperate and cold waters. Chernova (2008) has proposed that the genus should be subdivided into five subgenera: Liparis, Neoliparis, Lycocara, Careliparis, and Lyoliparis.

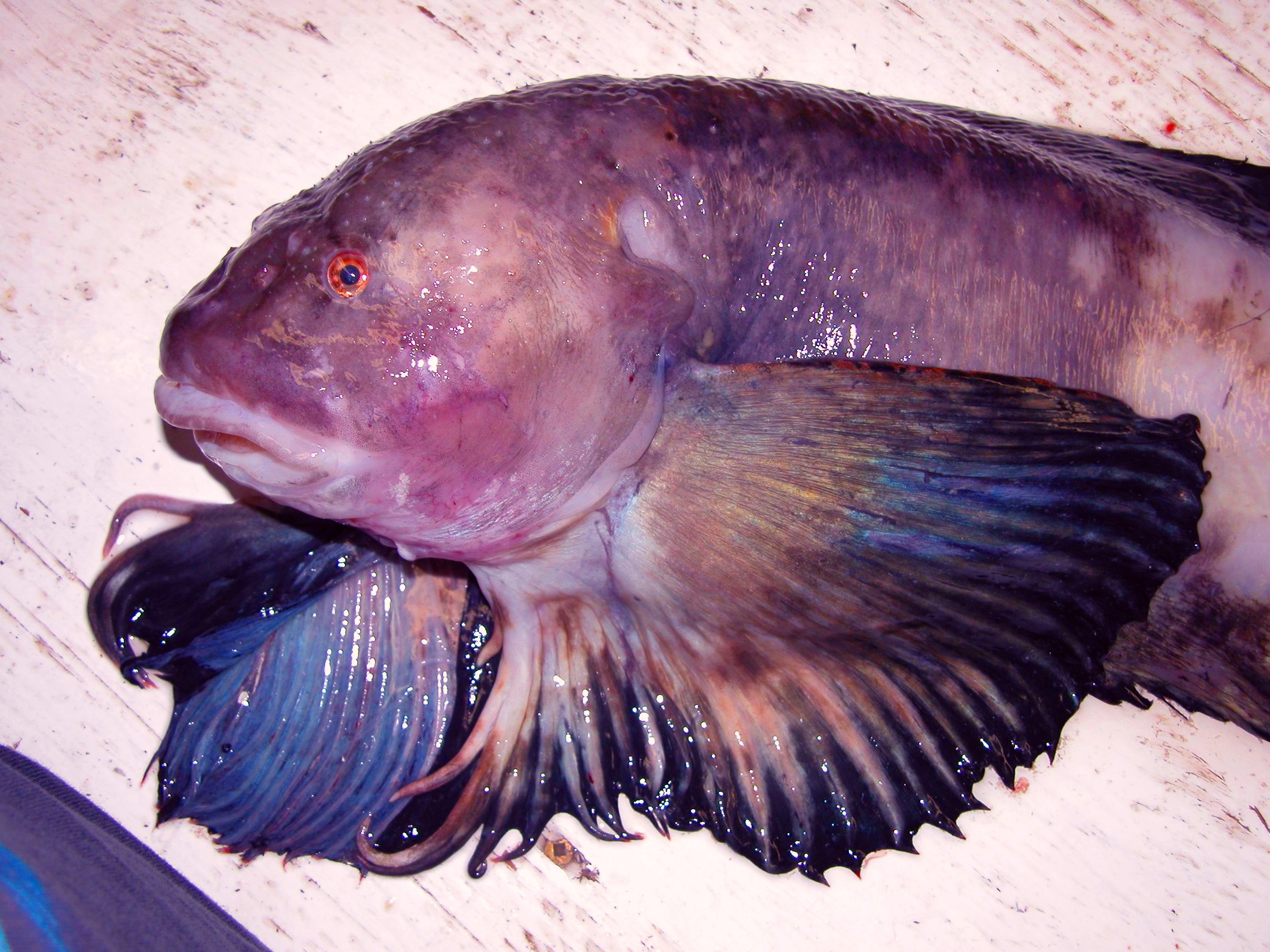
Purity snailfish (Liparis catharus)

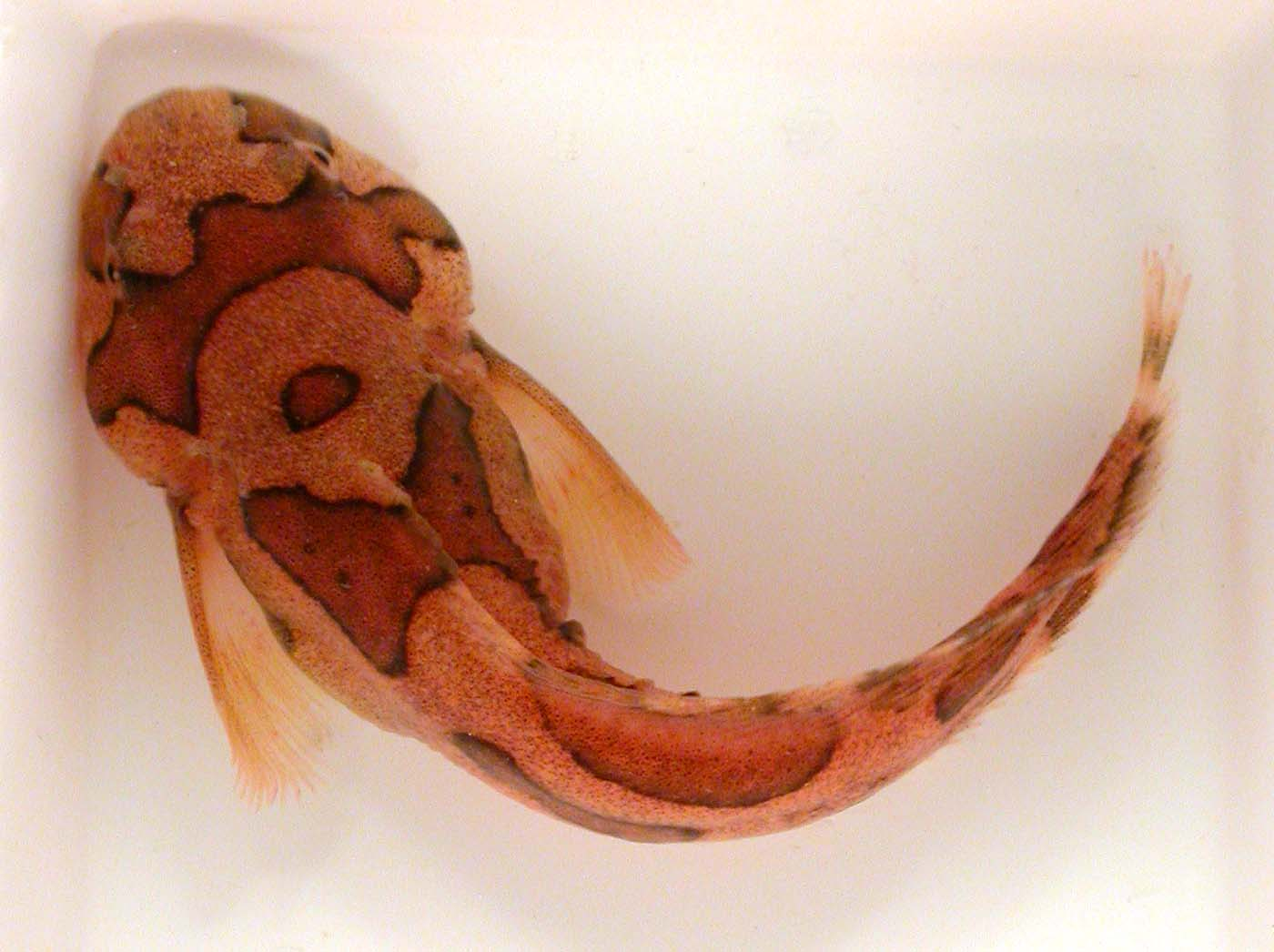
Festive snailfish (Liparis marmoratus)

== Species ==
There are currently 60 recognized species in this genus:

- Liparis adiastolus Stein, C. E. Bond & Misitano, 2003
- Liparis agassizii Putnam, 1874
- Liparis alboventer (Krasyukova, 1984)
- Liparis antarcticus Putnam, 1874
- Liparis atlanticus (D. S. Jordan & Evermann, 1898) (Atlantic seasnail)
- Liparis barbatus Ekström (sv), 1832 (Common sea-snail)
- Liparis bikunin Matsubara & Iwai, 1954
- Liparis brashnikovi Soldatov, 1930
- Liparis bristolensis (Burke, 1912)
- Liparis burkei (D. S. Jordan & W. F. Thompson, 1914)
- Liparis callyodon (Pallas, 1814) (Spotted snailfish)
- Liparis catharus K. D. Vogt, 1973 (Purity snailfish)
- Liparis chefuensis H. W. Wu & Ki. Fu. Wang, 1933
- Liparis coheni Able, 1976 (Gulf snailfish)
- Liparis curilensis (C. H. Gilbert & Burke, 1912)
- Liparis cyclopus Günther, 1861 (Ribbon snailfish)
- Liparis dennyi D. S. Jordan & Starks, 1895 (Marbled snailfish)
- Liparis dubius Soldatov, 1930
- Liparis dulkeiti Soldatov, 1930
- Liparis eos Krasyukova, 1984
- Liparis fabricii Krøyer, 1847 (Gelatinous snailfish)
- Liparis fishelsoni J. L. B. Smith, 1967
- Liparis florae (D. S. Jordan & Starks, 1895) (Tidepool snailfish)
- Liparis frenatus (C. H. Gilbert & Burke, 1912)
- Liparis fucensis C. H. Gilbert, 1896 (Slipskin snailfish)
- Liparis gibbus T. H. Bean, 1881 (Variegated snailfish)
- Liparis grebnitzkii (P. J. Schmidt, 1904)
- Liparis greeni (D. S. Jordan & Starks, 1895) (Lobefin snailfish)
- Liparis inquilinus Able, 1973 (Inquiline snailfish)
- Liparis kusnetzovi Taranetz, 1935
- Liparis kussakini Pinchuk, 1976
- Liparis latifrons P. Y. Schmidt, 1950
- Liparis liparis (Linnaeus, 1766) (Striped seasnail)
- Liparis maculatus Krasyukova, 1984
- Liparis marmoratus P. Y. Schmidt, 1950 (Festive snailfish)
- Liparis mednius (Soldatov, 1930)
- Liparis megacephalus (Burke, 1912)
- Liparis micraspidophorus (C. H. Gilbert & Burke, 1912)
- Liparis miostomus Matsubara & Iwai, 1954
- Liparis montagui (Donovan, 1804) (Montagu's seasnail)
- Liparis mucosus Ayres, 1855 (Slimy snailfish)
- Liparis newmani Cohen, 1960
- Liparis ochotensis P. J. Schmidt, 1904
- Liparis owstoni (D. S. Jordan & Snyder, 1904)
- Liparis petschiliensis (Rendahl (de), 1926)
- Liparis pravdini P. Y. Schmidt, 1951
- Liparis pulchellus Ayres, 1855 (Showy snailfish)
- Liparis punctatus P. Y. Schmidt, 1950
- Liparis punctulatus (S. Tanaka (I), 1916)
- Liparis rhodosoma Burke, 1930
- Liparis rotundirostris Krasyukova, 1984
- Liparis rutteri (C. H. Gilbert & Snyder, 1898) (Ringtail snailfish)
- Liparis schantarensis (Lindberg & Dulkeit, 1929) (Shantar snailfish)
- Liparis schmidti Lindberg & Krasyukova, 1987
- Liparis tanakae (C. H. Gilbert & Burke, 1912) (Tanaka's snailfish)
- Liparis tartaricus Soldatov, 1930
- Liparis tessellatus (C. H. Gilbert & Burke, 1912)
- Liparis tunicatiformis Krasyukova, 1984
- Liparis tunicatus J. C. H. Reinhardt, 1836 (Kelp snailfish)
- Liparis zonatus Chernova, Stein & Andriashev, 2004
