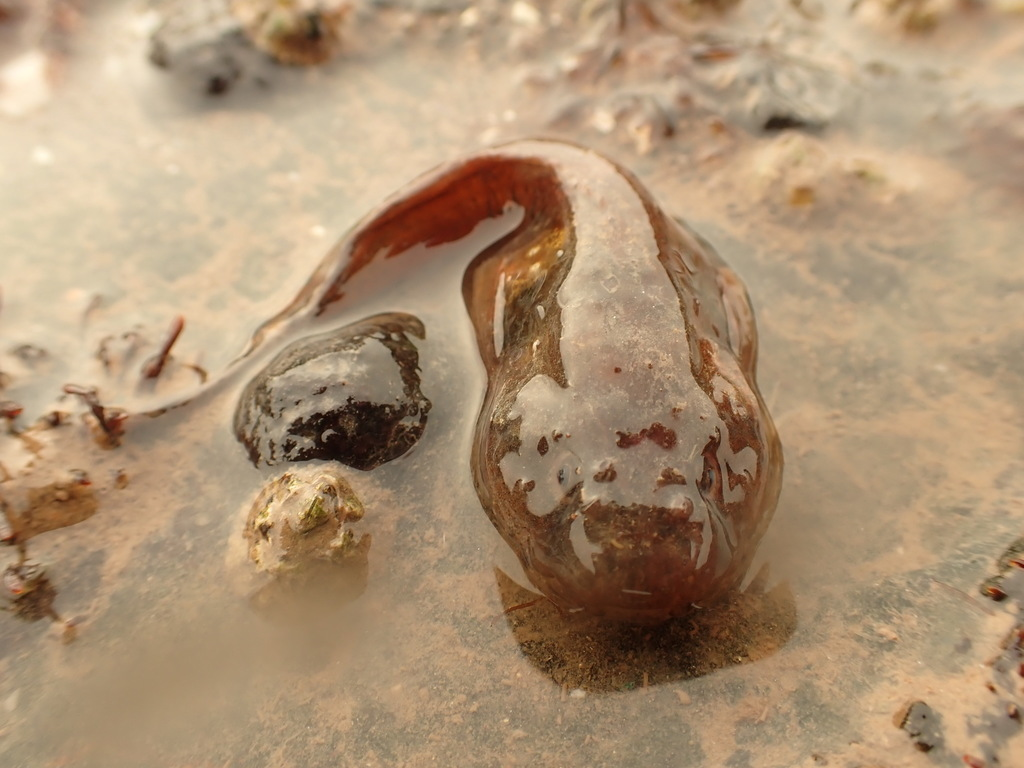

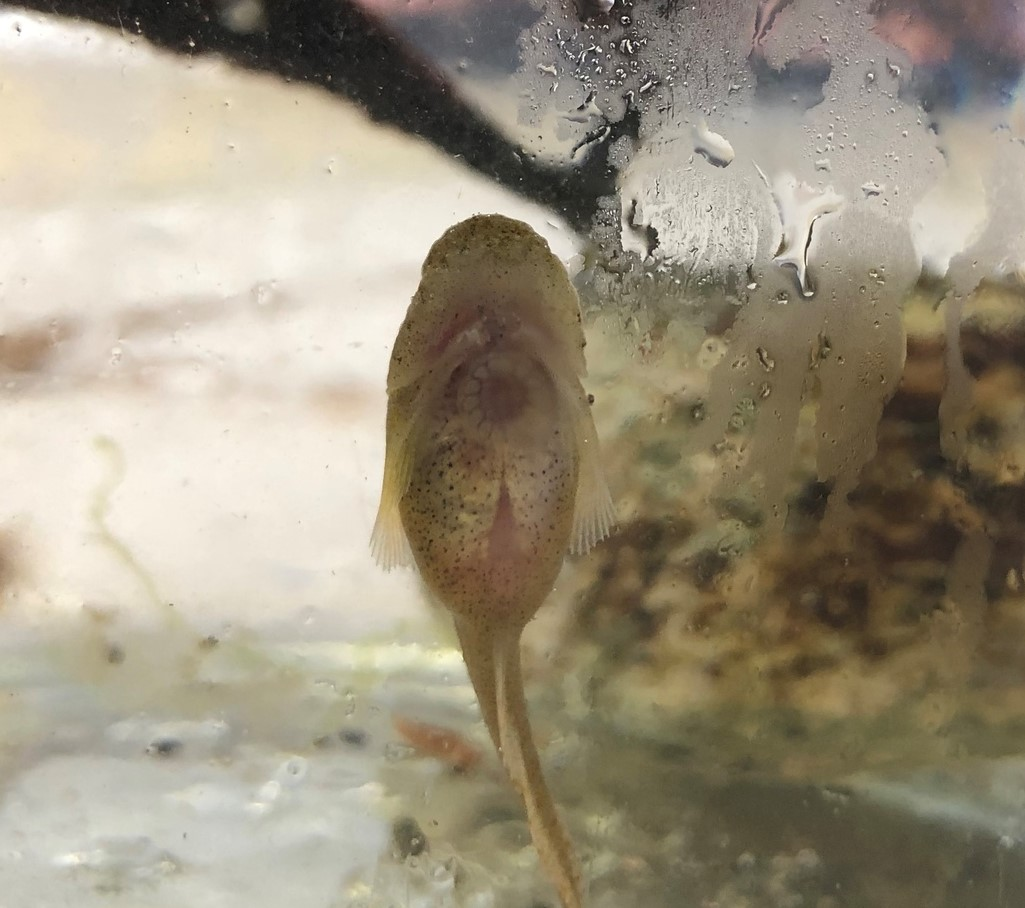
- Ventral sucker

Conservation status
- Secure (NatureServe)

Scientific classification
- Kingdom: Animalia
- Phylum: Chordata
- Class: Actinopterygii
- Order: Perciformes
- Suborder: Cottoidei
- Family: Liparidae
- Genus: Liparis
- Species: L. atlanticus

Binomial name
- Liparis atlanticus (D. S. Jordan & Evermann, 1898)

Synonyms
- Neoliparis atlanticus Jordan & Evermann, 1898

= Liparis atlanticus =

Species of fish

Liparis atlanticus, the Atlantic snailfish or Atlantic seasnail, is a species of marine ray-finned fish belonging to the family Liparidae, the snailfishes. This species is found in the western Atlantic Ocean off the eastern coast of North America.

== Taxonomy ==
Liparis atlanticus was first formally described as Neoliparis atlanticus in 1898 by the American ichthyologists David Starr Jordan and Barton Warren Evermann with its type locality given as Godbout in Quebec. Some authorities place this species in the subgenus Neoliparis, while other include it in the nominate subgenus of Liparis.

== Description ==
Liparis atlanticus is a small tadpole-like fish with a soft, scaleless body and complex ventral sucker formed from heavily modified pelvic fins. It has a single dorsal fin which is clearly incised at the 5th or 6th ray and the fins have comparatively ferwer fin rays than its congeners. The overall color is brown, lightening on the flanks and pale on the ventral surface with some black spots on sensory pores and barring on the fins. This species reaches a maximum length of about 13 cm (5.1 in).

== Distribution and habitat ==
Liparis atlanticus are found in the coastal waters of the northwest Atlantic Ocean, ranging from Ungava Bay in Quebec to New Jersey. The Atlantic snailfish lives in intertidal zones and the immediately subtidal region to depths of 90 m (300 ft). In northern parts of its range, it is often found along the shoreline in seaweed beds.

== Biology ==
Liparis atlanticus attains sexual maturity in their second year when they reach a length of 60 to 70 mm (2.4 to 2.8 in). They migrate into intertidal areas from mid-October prior to spawning in March and moving out of the intertidal zone in June. The males select and prepare a spawning site. The larger females have been recorded as spawning several times in a season, they deposit several small egg masses which the male fertilizes and collects into a single mass. This mass is hidden among stones and algae. Their diet is mainly polychaetes and crustaceans.
