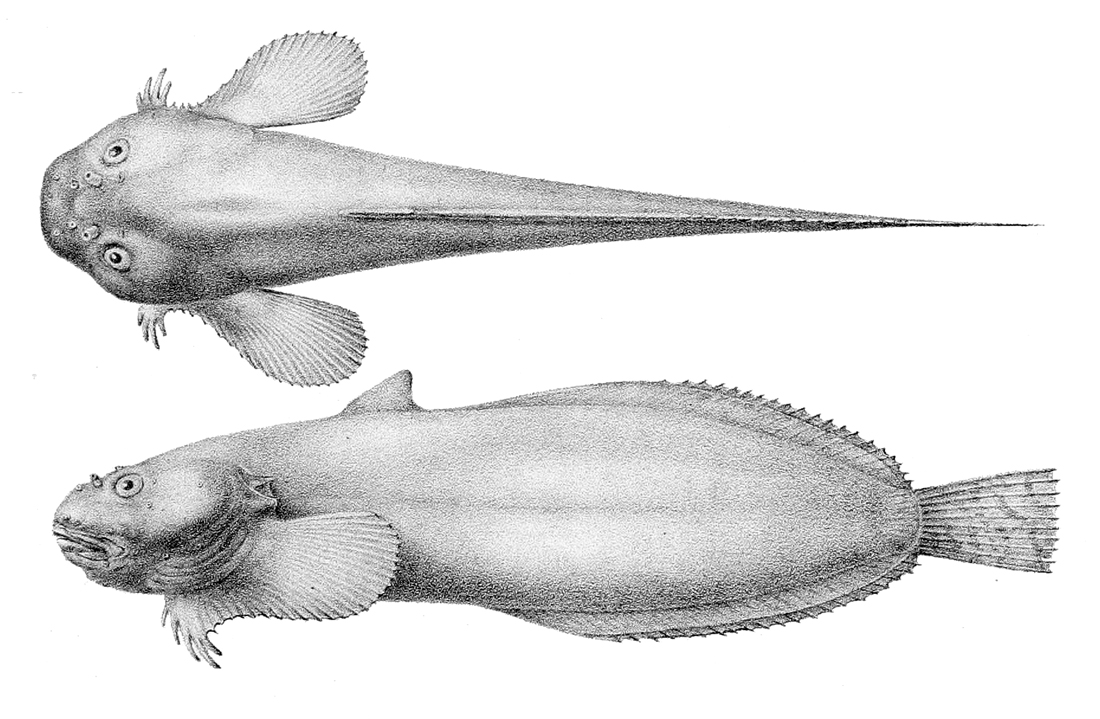

Scientific classification
- Domain: Eukaryota
- Kingdom: Animalia
- Phylum: Chordata
- Class: Actinopterygii
- Order: Perciformes
- Suborder: Cottoidei
- Family: Liparidae
- Genus: Liparis
- Species: L. mucosus

Binomial name
- Liparis mucosus Ayres, 1855

= Liparis mucosus =

Species of fish

Liparis mucosus, or the slimy snailfish, is a fish from the genus Liparis. The fish can be found from intertidal areas to 15 meters in depth. In general, they are not found in tide pools. The slimy snailfish ranges in the Northeastern Pacific Ocean from Sitka, Alaska to southern British Columbia, Canada as well as to Baja California, Mexico. It grows to 2.8–5 inches.

== Description ==
The slimy snailfish's color varies from gray to brownish to red, and occasionally the fish has dark stripes. Its dorsal fin has a lobe at the front. The fish's gill slit extends to the front of the upper pectoral fin rays. The dorsal and anal fins do not extend onto the caudal fins.

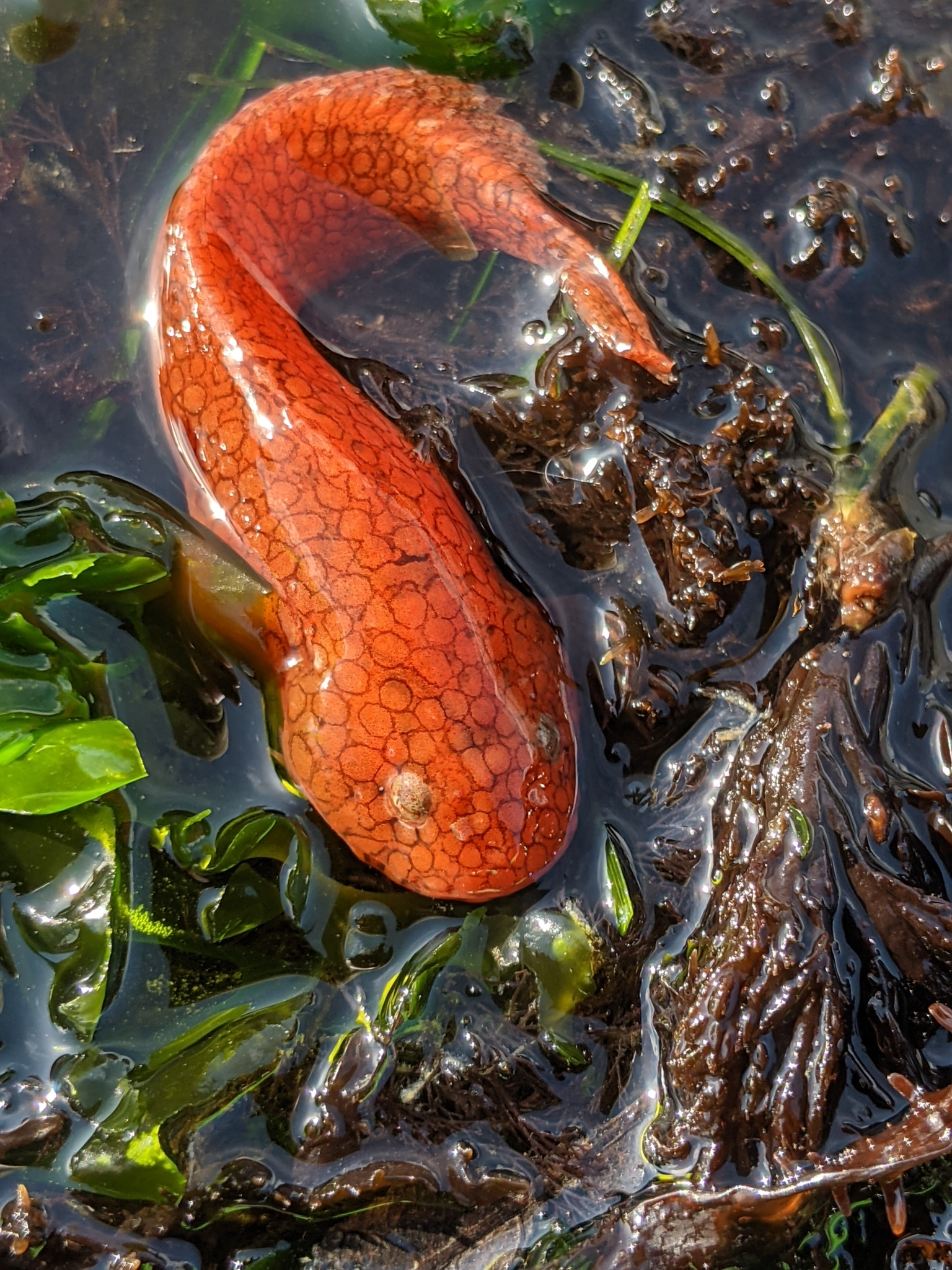

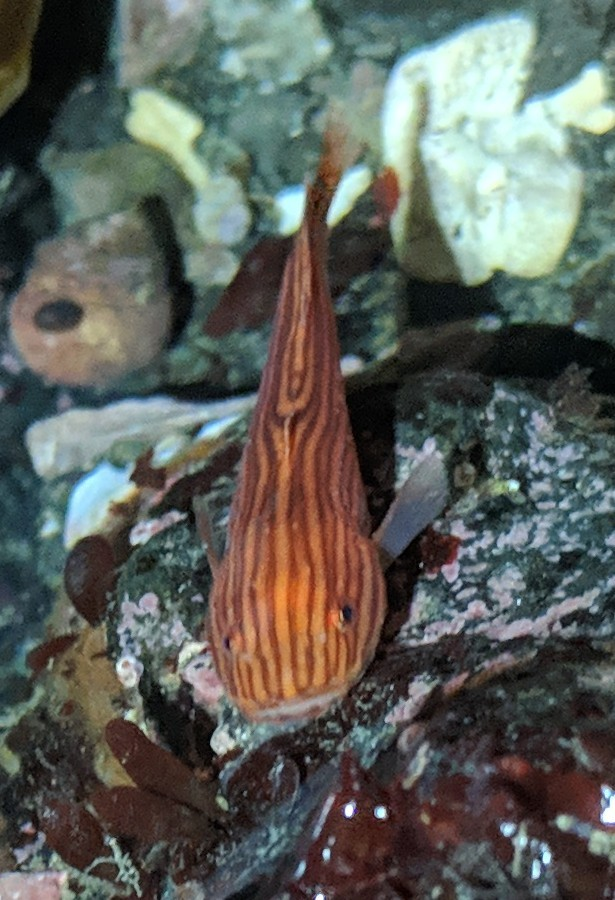

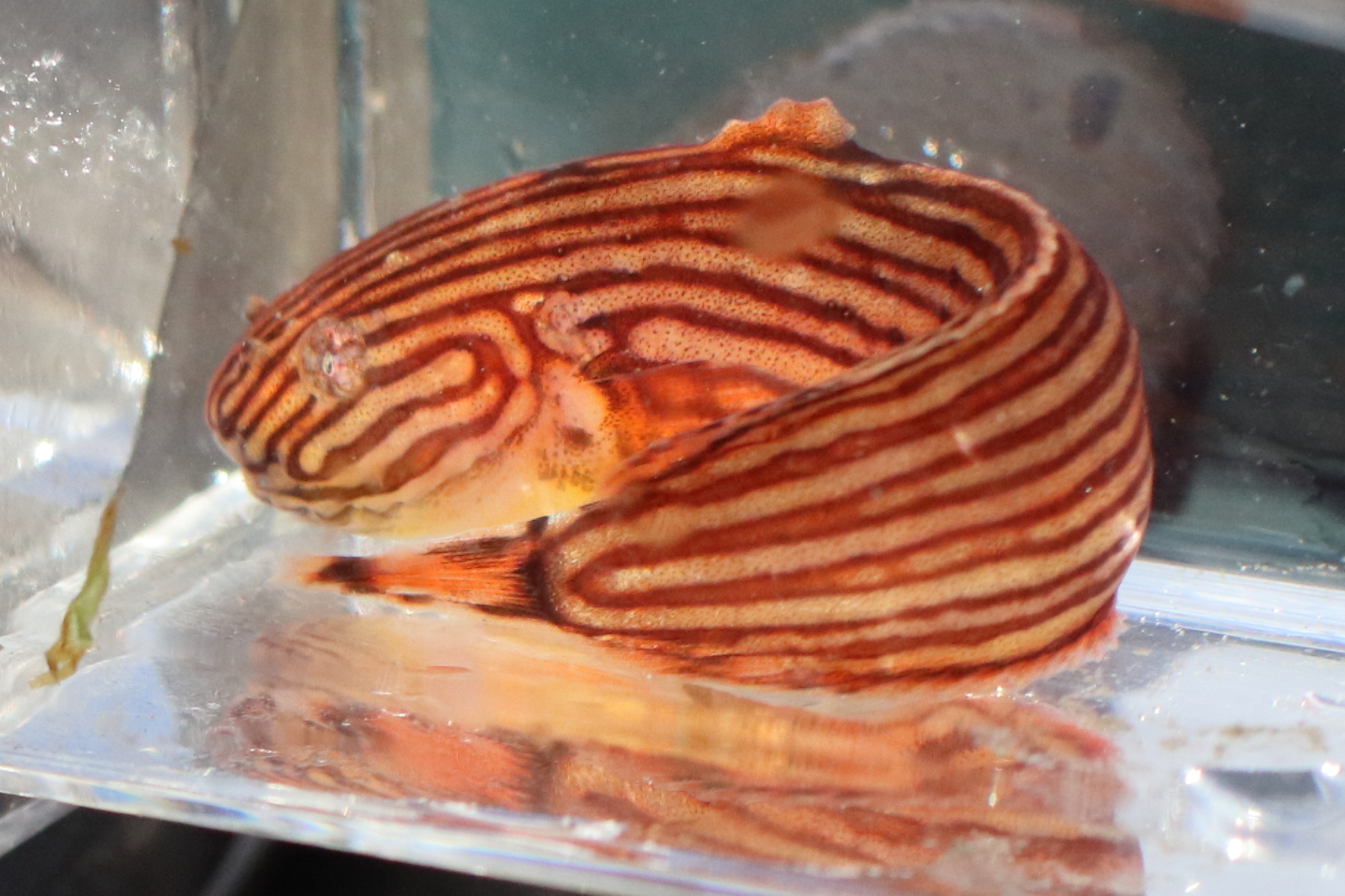

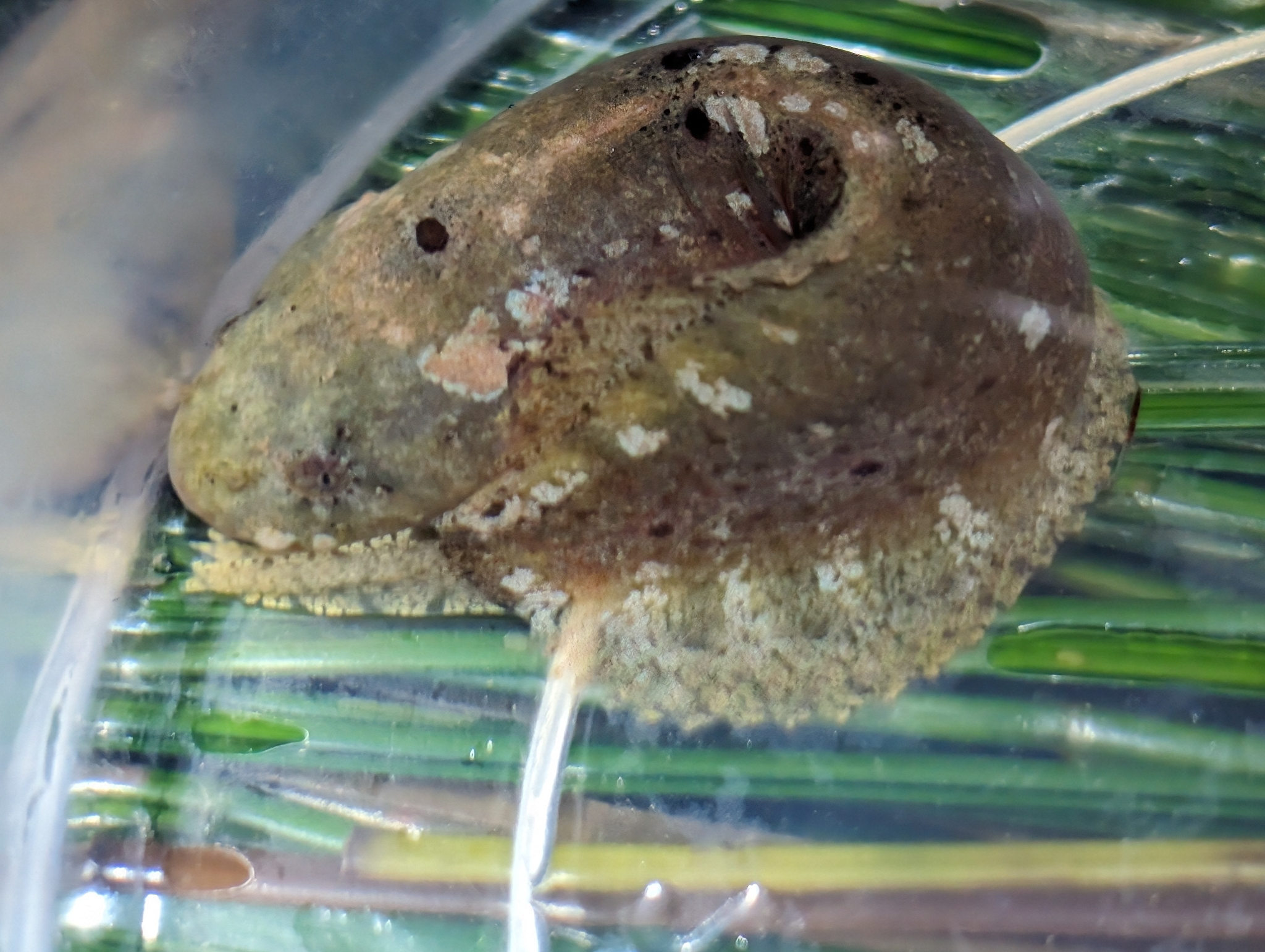

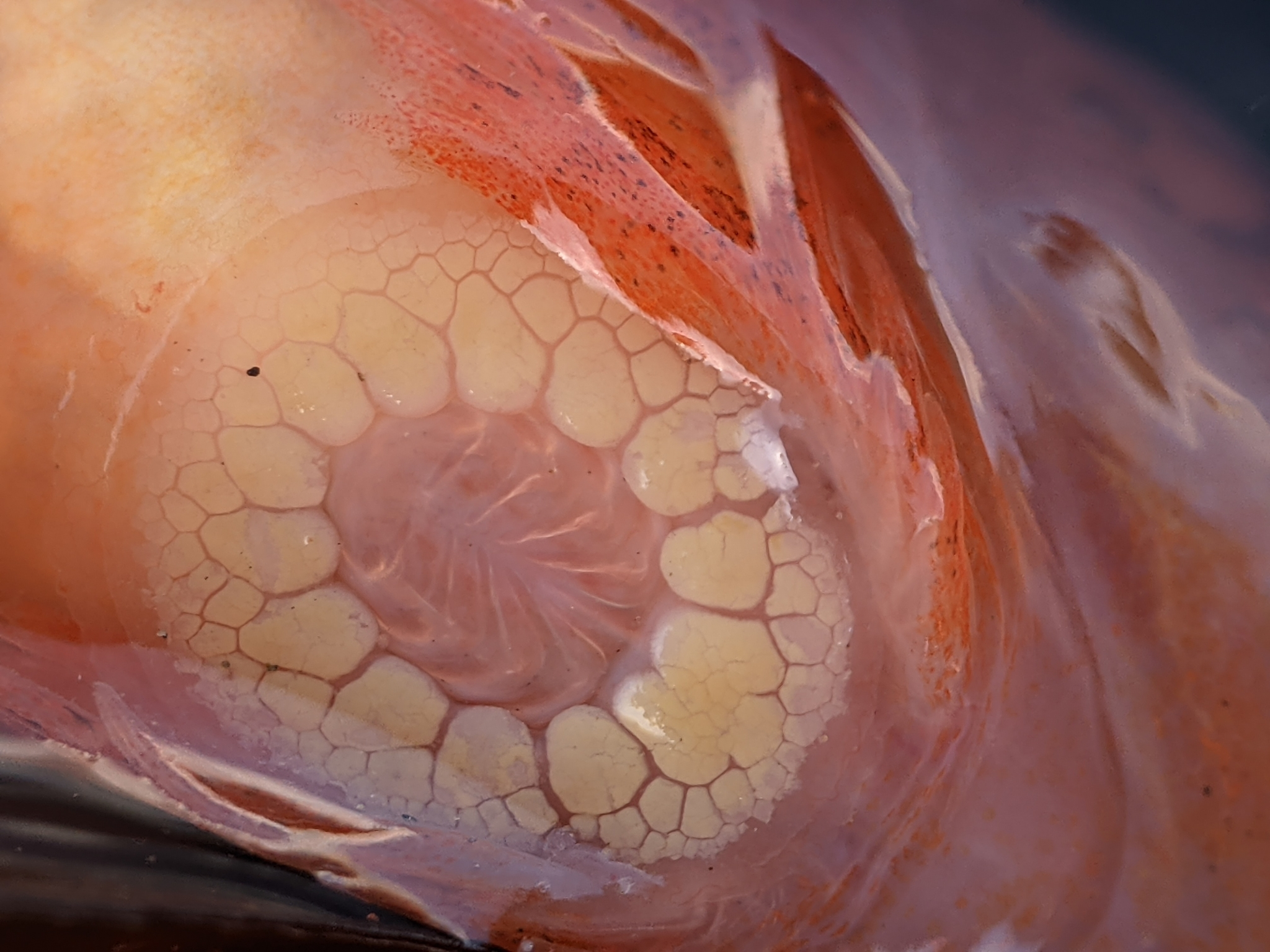
