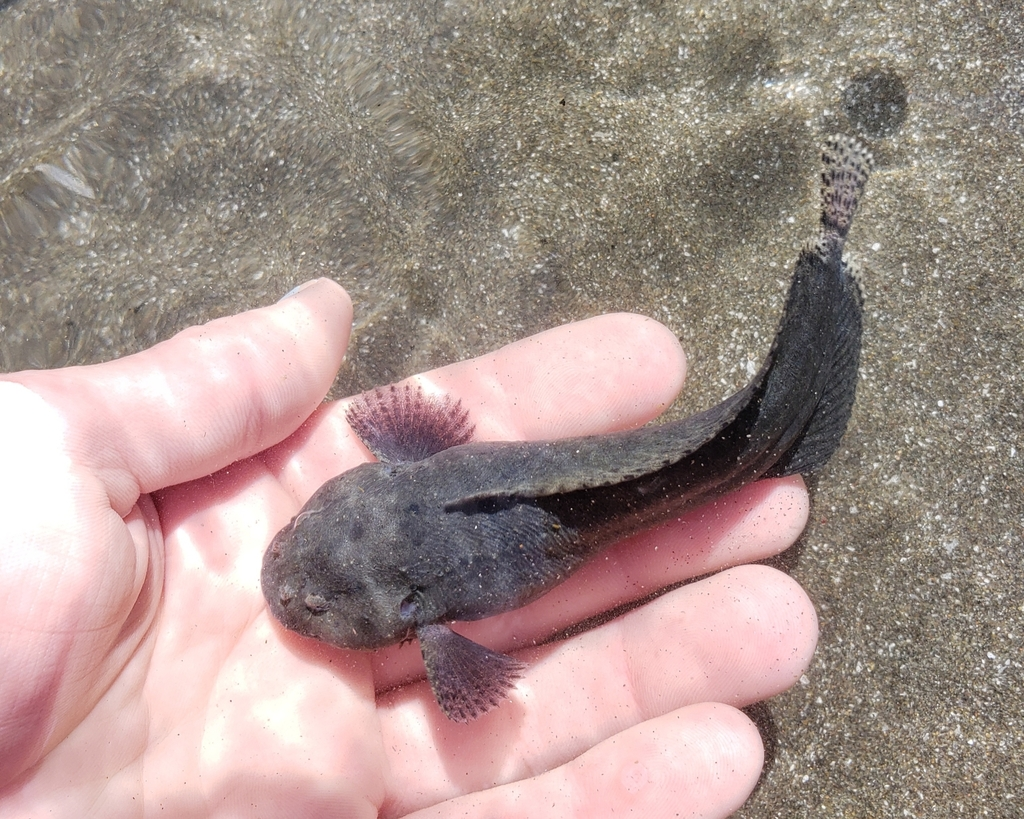

Scientific classification
- Kingdom: Animalia
- Phylum: Chordata
- Class: Actinopterygii
- Order: Perciformes
- Suborder: Cottoidei
- Family: Liparidae
- Genus: Liparis
- Species: L. adiastolus

Binomial name
- Liparis adiastolus Stein, Bond & Misitano, 2003

= Liparis adiastolus =

Species of fish

Liparis adiastolus, also known as the Rosybrown snailfish, is a species of marine ray-finned fish belonging to the family Liparidae, the snailfishes. Native to the Northeastern Pacific Ocean, it may be found in shallow water and estuaries. The fish have a pale ring at the base of their caudal fins.
