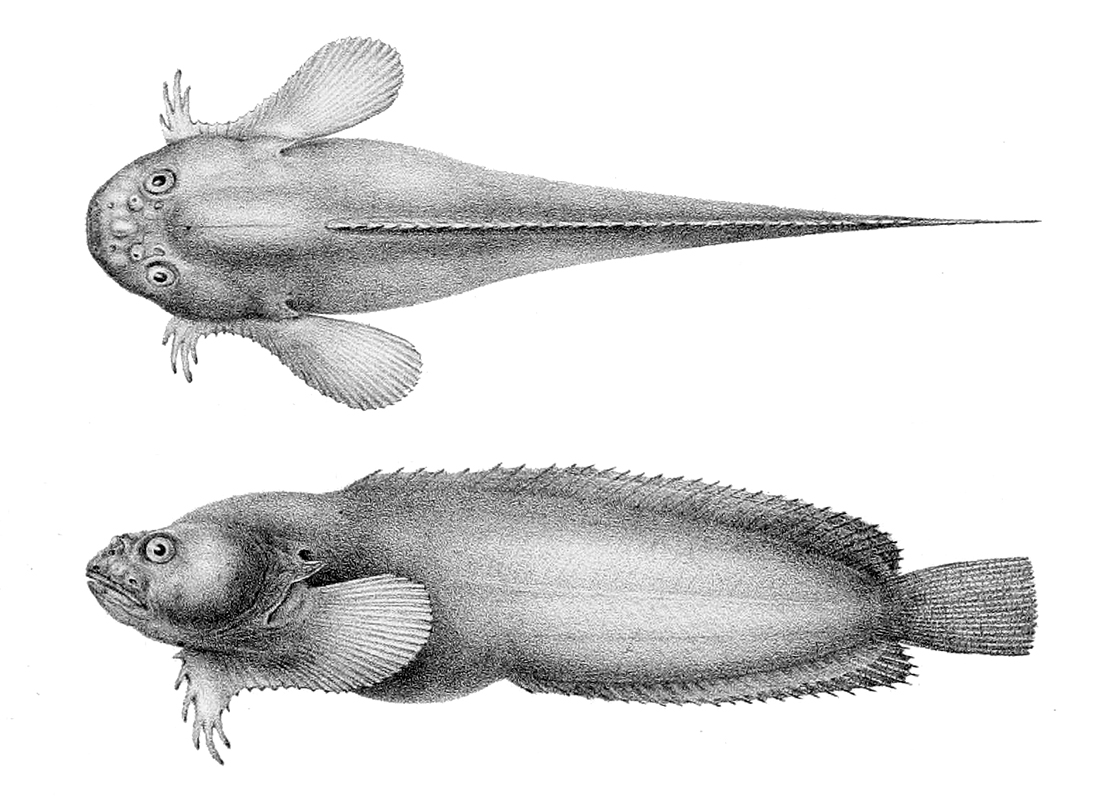

Scientific classification
- Domain: Eukaryota
- Kingdom: Animalia
- Phylum: Chordata
- Class: Actinopterygii
- Order: Perciformes
- Suborder: Cottoidei
- Family: Liparidae
- Genus: Liparis
- Species: L. callyodon

Binomial name
- Liparis callyodon Pallas, 1814

= Liparis callyodon =

Species of fish

Liparis callyodon, or the spotted snailfish and by one source the beautiful tooth seasnail, is a fish from the genus Liparis. It lives in marine and demersal environments at a depth range from zero to twenty meters. It can be found at temperate climate zones, such as the eastern Pacific Ocean from Alaska, USA to Oregon, USA, in intertidal zones (tide pools). The name callyodon comes from the Greek word meaning "beautiful tooth". Pallas chose this name after the species' tricuspid teeth.

== Description ==
The fish grows to a total length of 12.7 centimeters. It neither has dorsal spines nor anal spines.
