= Liparis burkei =

Scientific classification
- Domain: Eukaryota
- Kingdom: Animalia
- Phylum: Chordata
- Class: Actinopterygii
- Order: Perciformes
- Suborder: Cottoidei
- Family: Liparidae
- Genus: Liparis
- Species: L. burkei

Binomial name
- Liparis burkei D. S. Jordan & W. F. Thompson, 1914

Species of fish

Liparis burkei is a fish from the genus Liparis. It lives in shallow waters in marine environments in the demersal zone. Liparis burkei grows to a maximum length of 8.3 cm (in standard length) and is found in the Northwestern Pacific Ocean by Japan.
