= Liparis bristolensis =

Scientific classification
- Kingdom: Animalia
- Phylum: Chordata
- Class: Actinopterygii
- Order: Perciformes
- Suborder: Cottoidei
- Family: Liparidae
- Genus: Liparis
- Species: L. bristolensis

Binomial name
- Liparis bristolensis Burke, 1912

Species of fish

Liparis bristolensis is a marine fish from the genus Liparis. It lives in the demersal zone at a depth between thirty-one and seventy-seven meters. The species may be found in the Northwest Pacific Ocean, specifically in the South Bering Sea and the western Gulf of Alaska.
