= Bumping (chemistry) =

Delayed rapid boiling

Bumping is a phenomenon in chemistry where homogeneous liquids boiled in a test tube or other container will superheat and, upon nucleation, rapid boiling will expel the liquid from the container. In extreme cases, the container may be broken.

== Cause ==
Bumping occurs when a liquid is heated or has its pressure reduced very rapidly, typically in smooth, clean glassware. The hardest part of bubble formation is the initial formation of the bubble; once a bubble has formed, it can grow quickly. Because the liquid is typically above its boiling point, when the liquid finally starts to boil, a large vapor bubble is formed that pushes the liquid out of the test tube, typically at high speed. This rapid expulsion of boiling liquid poses a serious hazard to others and oneself in the lab. Furthermore, if a liquid is boiled and cooled back down, the chance of bumping increases on each subsequent boil, because each heating cycle progressively de-gasses the liquid, reducing the number of remaining nucleation sites.

== Prevention ==
The most common way of preventing bumping is by adding one or two boiling chips to the reaction vessel. However, these alone may not prevent bumping and for this reason it is advisable to boil liquids in a boiling tube, a boiling flask, or an Erlenmeyer flask. In addition, heating test tubes should never be pointed towards any person, just in case bumping does occur. Whenever a liquid is cooled below its boiling point and re-heated to a boil, a new boiling chip will be needed, as the pores in the old boiling chip tend to fill with solvent, rendering it ineffective.

A sealed capillary tube can also be placed in a boiling solution to provide a nucleation site, reducing the bumping risk and allowing its easy removal from a system.

Stirring a liquid also lessens the chances of bumping, as the resulting vortex breaks up any large bubbles that might form, and the stirring itself creates bubbles.
