= Allient =

Corporation in New York, USA

Allient Inc.
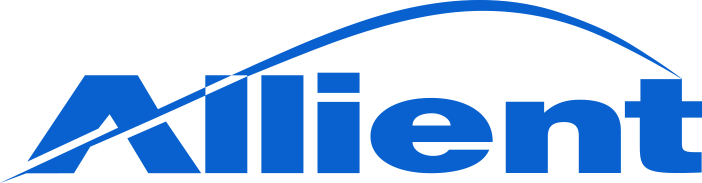
- Formerly: Allied Motion Technologies
- Type: Public
- Traded as: Nasdaq: ALNT; Russell 2000 Component
- Industry: Electromechanical; Motion Control
- Predecessor: Hathaway Corporation
- Founded: January 1939; 87 years ago, in Denver, Colorado, U.S. (as Claude Hathaway)
- Founder: Claude Hathaway
- Headquarters: Amherst, New York, U.S.
- Number of locations: 28
- Areas served: Worldwide
- Key people: Richard S. Warzala (chairman of the board, president, and CEO)
- Products: Electro-magnetic, mechanical, and electronic motion technology
- Number of employees: ~2,200
- Website: allient.com

Allient Inc., formerly Allied Motion Technologies is an American public corporation headquartered in New York, United States that produces precision and specialty motion control components and systems for commercial, industrial, medical, vehicle, aerospace and defense markets.

The company operates facilities in the United States, Canada, Mexico, Europe and Asia and sells its products globally. The company provides motion, controls, and power quality products and systems for a range of applications in several target markets including aerospace and defense, medical, vehicle, commercial, and industrial. The company designs and manufactures electric motors, electronic motion control components, gear motors, transaxles and traction wheels, control electronics and drives, optical encoders, and power quality. It sells its products primarily to original equipment manufacturers (OEMs) utilizing its own direct sales force, independent sales representatives and distributors.

== History ==
Allient Inc. (formerly Allied Motion) was founded in January 1939 in Denver, Colorado by Claude Hathaway under the name of Hathaway Instruments Company. The company developed and successfully sold electrical instruments to a number of industries through the 1940s and early 1950s.

In 1955, the Hamilton Watch Company purchased the company from Mr. Hathaway. It was operated as a division of Hamilton until January 1960, when the division was purchased by an investor group composed in part of executives working in the division. The new company was named Hathaway Instruments, Inc. The company became a U.S. public company in 1962 under the laws of Colorado, originally named 5800 Corporation. Within days of incorporation the name of the company was changed to Hathaway Instruments Inc.

In 1982 the name of the corporation was again changed to Hathaway Corporation. By 1995, the company had developed and was manufacturing and selling instrumentation used to monitor and control the operations of power generating, transmission, and distribution facilities of electric utility and process control companies. The company had also established a nascent motion control business. At this time, Hathaway Corporation consisted of two wholly owned subsidiaries, Hathaway Systems Corporation (HSC) and subsidiaries and Computer Optical Products, Inc. The Company’s name was also changed to Hathaway Corporation. The motion control business was organized into two divisions and one subsidiary: Hathaway Motion Control, Hathaway Motors and Instruments, and Computer Optical Products, Inc., respectively. Between 1962 and 2001 Hathaway executed several acquisitions and mergers of subsidiaries into the parent corporation. In addition, joint ventures in China were established and other acquisitions occurred.

At the end of 2001, Hathaway Corporation consisted basically of the Power and Process business, selling into the electric utility market, and a motion control business operated as a wholly owned subsidiary, Hathaway Motion Control Corporation. In 2002, the company took the decision to focus solely on motion control products and markets. As a result, on July 29, 2002, the company sold its electric utility products division along with the Hathaway brand name to the Danaher Corporation. The day following the divestiture of the Power and Process business, the company completed the acquisition of Motor Products - Owosso Corporation and Motor Products - Ohio Corporation, both manufacturers of permanent magnet DC motors, from the Owosso Corporation. These were the first acquisitions by the company in accordance with its plan to grow its motion control business platform.

On November 19, 2002, the company formally changed its name from Hathaway Corporation to Allied Motion Technologies, Inc. On August 23, 2023 the company formally changed its name from Allied Motion Technologies Inc. to Allient Inc. to showcase the diversity of the technologies offered through acquisitions. The name was chosen to better reflect the future business direction of the company.

== Products ==
Key products of this company are brush and brushless DC motors, brushless servo and torque motors, coreless DC motors, brushless motors with integrated drives, gearmotors, digital servo drives, motion controllers, incremental and absolute optical encoders, powered wheels and transaxles, power quality devices for reducing or eliminating harmonic distortion, as well as power wheelchair control systems.

== Acquisitions ==
At different times after the establishment of Allied Motion Technologies Inc., the company, through acquisition, became the owner of the following brands: Agile Systems, Globe Motors, Heidrive, Maval (steering products), Motor Products, Östergrens Elmotor, Premotec, Stature Electric, ThinGap, Trans-Coil International (TCI), Dynamic Controls, ORMEC Systems Corp, ALIO Industries, Spectrum Controls, SierraMotion

== Conflict minerals ==
Allient Inc. says that it supports ending the violence and human rights violations in the mining of certain minerals from a location described as the "Conflict Region" that is situated in the eastern portion of the Democratic Republic of the Congo (DRC) and surrounding countries. The U.S. Securities and Exchange Commission ("SEC") has adopted a final rule to implement reporting and disclosure requirements related to "conflict minerals" (gold, tin, tantalum, and tungsten, the derivatives of cassiterite, columbite-tantalite, and wolframite) as directed by the Dodd-Frank Wall Street Reform and Consumer Protection Act of 2010. The rule requires manufacturers who file certain reports with the SEC to disclose whether the products they manufacture or contract to manufacture contain "conflict minerals" that are "necessary to the functionality or production" of those products.
