= Boiling chip =

Substances used to calm the boiling process

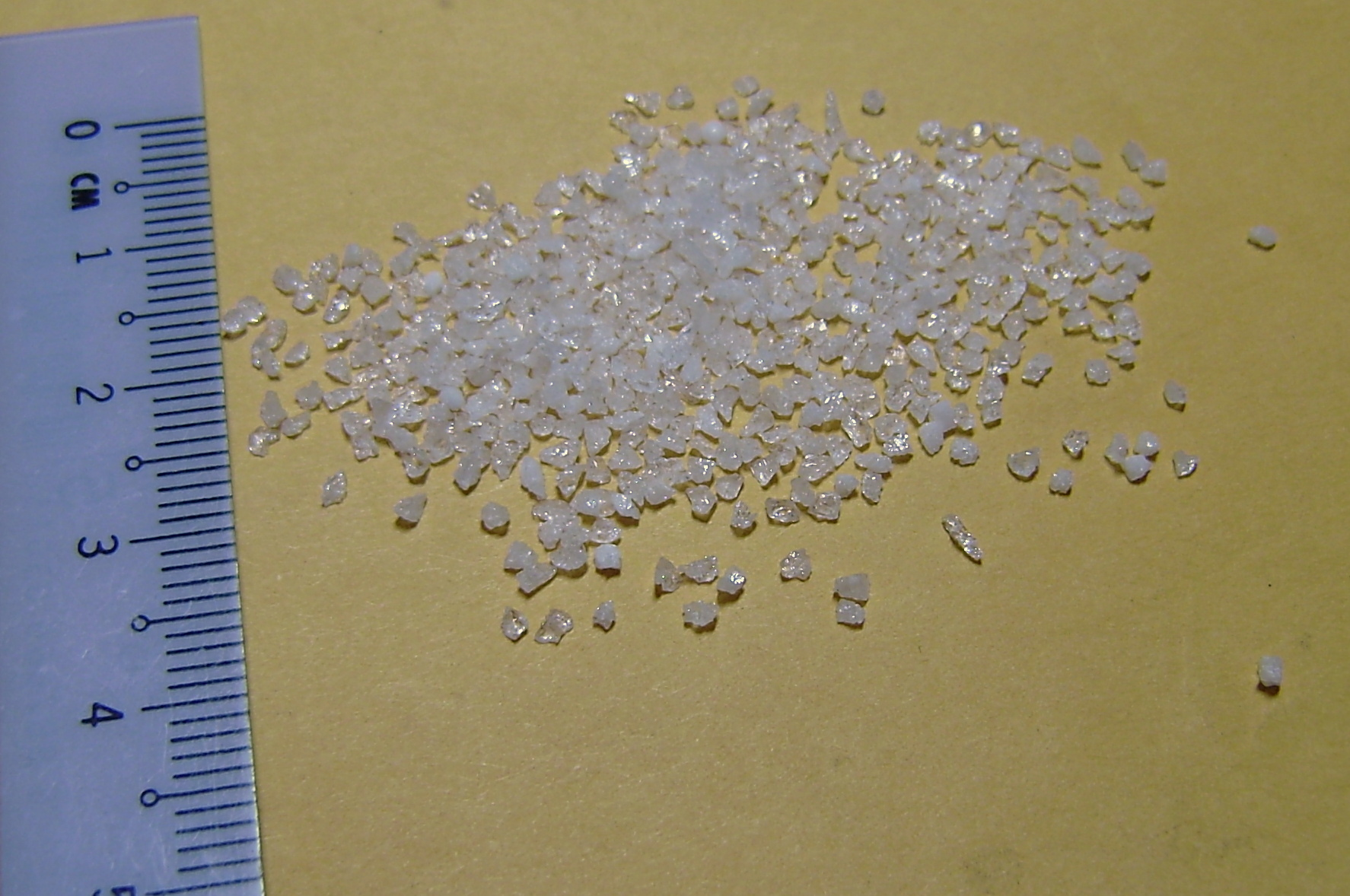
Boiling chips

A boiling chip, boiling stone, or porous bit anti-bumping granule is a tiny, irregular shaped piece of substance added to liquids to make them boil more calmly. Boiling chips are frequently employed in distillation and heating. When a liquid becomes superheated, a speck of dust or a stirring rod can cause violent flash boiling. Boiling chips provide nucleation sites so the liquid boils smoothly without becoming superheated or bumping.

== Use ==
Boiling chips should not be added to liquid that is already near its boiling point, as this could also induce flash boiling. Boiling chips should not be used when cooking unless they are suitable for food-grade applications.

The structure of a boiling chip traps liquid while in use, meaning that they cannot be re-used in laboratory setups. They also don't work well under vacuum; if a solution is boiling under vacuum, it is best to constantly stir it instead.

== Materials ==
Boiling chips are typically made of a porous material, such as alumina, silicon carbide, calcium carbonate, calcium sulfate, porcelain or carbon, and often have a nonreactive coating of PTFE. This ensures that the boiling chips will provide effective nucleation sites, yet are chemically inert. In less demanding situations, like school laboratories, pieces of broken porcelainware or glassware are often used.
