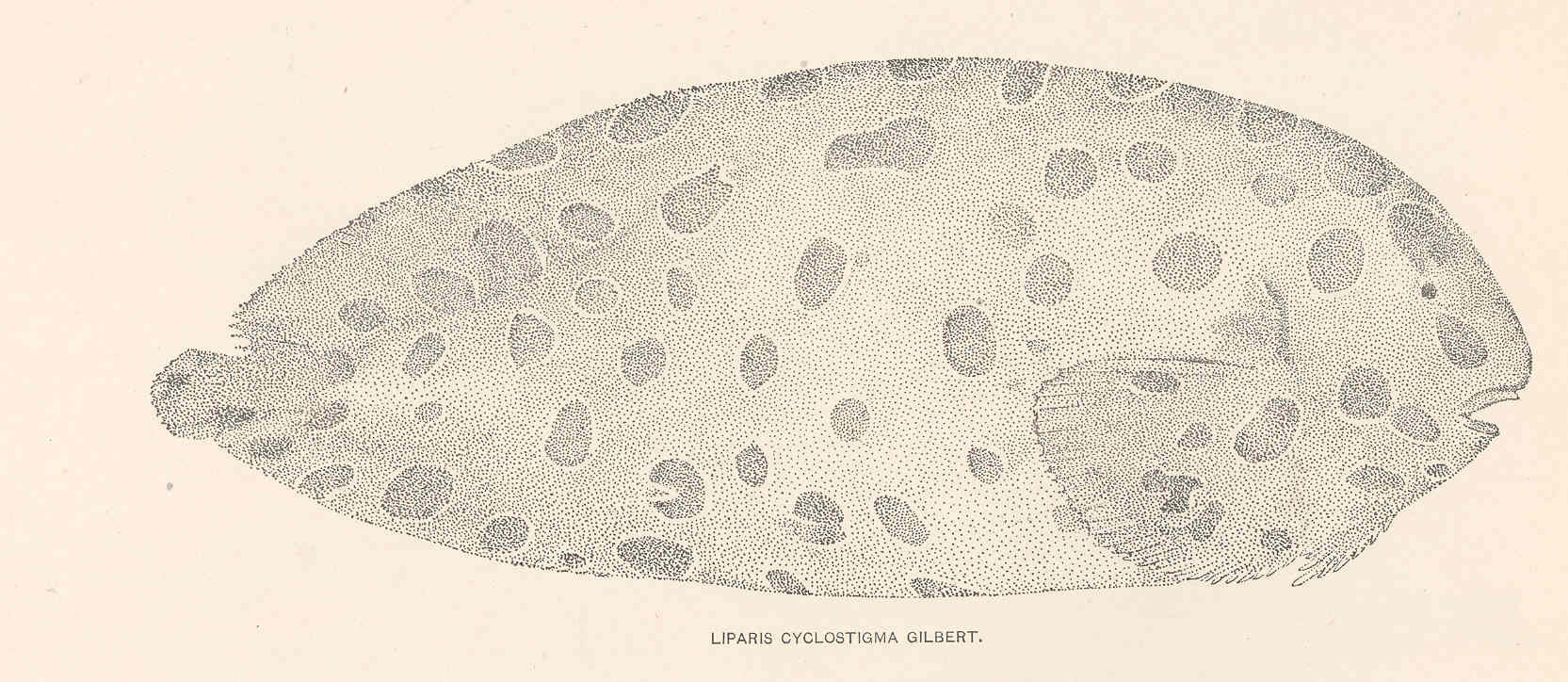

Scientific classification
- Kingdom: Animalia
- Phylum: Chordata
- Class: Actinopterygii
- Order: Perciformes
- Suborder: Cottoidei
- Family: Liparidae
- Genus: Liparis
- Species: L. gibbus

Binomial name
- Liparis gibbus Bean, 1881

Synonyms
- Liparis cyclostigma Gilbert, 1896; Liparis liparis bathyarcticus Parr, 1931; Liparis rufescens Burke, 1930

= Liparis gibbus =

Species of fish

Liparis gibbus, the polka-dot snailfish, variegated snailfish or dusky snailfish, is a species of marine ray-finned fish belonging to the family Liparidae, the snailfishes. This fish is found in Arctic waters. Juveniles of the species have been found to be biofluorescent.

== Taxonomy ==
Liparis gibbus was first formally described by Tarleton Hoffman Bean in 1881 with its type locality given as Unalaska on Unalaska Island in the Aleutian Islands. The specific name gibbus means "humped" referring to the elevated nape and crown.

== Description ==
Liparis gibbus is mainly brown with white fins and black sprinkled around the body. The body is wide at the front becoming laterally compressed from the to the rear of the origin of the anal fin. The depth of the body at the level of the pectoral disk averages 22.7% of the standard length.

It grows to a maximum of 52 cm (20 in) in total length.

== Distribution and habitat ==
Liparis gibbus lives in the demersal zone at a depth from 0 to 647.9 metres (2,126 ft) in the Arctic, Northwest Pacific Ocean to Northeast Atlantic Ocean, Greenland, Canada, Baffin Island and Southeastern Alaska living among seaweed and rocks.

== Biology ==
Liparis gibbus likely spawns throughout the summer in the St Lawrence Estuary as larvae have been collected there from June to September, with the smallest sized specimens collected in September. They feed mainly on crustaceans, both benthic and pelagic species, with amphipods of the family Hyperiidae being dominant, although crabs have been recorded as food items too. This species reaches a maximum length of about 13 cm (5.1 in).

=== Biofluorescence ===
Juveniles of the variegated snailfish have been found to exhibit biofluorescence, emitting green and red fluorescence from different areas of their bodies.
