= Daniel L. Stein =

American physicist (born 1953)

Daniel L. Stein (born August 19, 1953) is an American physicist and professor of physics and mathematics at New York University. From 2006 to 2012 he served as the NYU dean of science.

He has contributed to a wide range of scientific fields. His early research covered diverse topics, including theoretical work on protein biophysics, biological evolution, amorphous semiconductors, quantum liquids, topology of order parameter spaces, liquid crystals, neutron stars, and the interface between particle physics and cosmology. His primary focus, however, has been on quenched randomness in condensed matter and on stochastic processes in both irreversible and extended systems. His research on these topics was cited by the American Association for the Advancement of Science as "pioneering work on the statistical mechanics of disordered and noisy systems".

He is best known for work on hierarchical dynamics (in collaboration with Elihu Abrahams, Philip Warren Anderson, and Richard Palmer); for observing that protein fluctuational conformations can be modeled using spin glass techniques; for constructing a theory of fluctuation-driven transitions in the absence of detailed balance (in collaboration with Robert Maier); for applying stochastic methods to determine lifetimes, stability, and decay of nanowires and nanomagnets (with a variety of collaborators); and for a series of rigorous and analytical results (largely with Charles M. Newman) on short-range spin glasses, including the introduction of the Newman-Stein metastate as a general mathematical tool for analyzing the thermodynamic properties of disordered systems.

== Education and early career ==
Stein graduated from Brown University in 1975 with degrees in physics and mathematics. He received his Ph.D. in Physics from Princeton University in 1979, under the thesis supervision of Philip Warren Anderson. He stayed on as a faculty member in the Princeton Physics Department until 1987, when he moved to the University of Arizona Physics Department, where he served as Department Head from 1995 to 2005. During that period he also served as the first Director of the Complex Systems Summer School in Santa Fe (1988, 1990–1998). In 2005 he moved to New York University as Professor of Physics and Mathematics and as Provost Faculty Fellow. He became the NYU Dean of Science in September 2006, serving until 2012.

== Honors ==
He currently serves as co-chair of the Santa Fe Institute Science Board and is a General Member of the Aspen Center for Physics. From 2008 through 2012 he served on the Air Force Scientific Advisory Board. His awards include a Sloan Foundation Fellowship (1985–1989), election to Fellowship of the American Physical Society (1999), University of Arizona Commission on the Status of Women Vision 2000 Award, election to Fellowship of the American Association for the Advancement of Science (2008), the Exemplary Civilian Service Medal of the U.S. Air Force (2012), and a John Simon Guggenheim Fellowship (2014–2015).

== Personal life ==
He is married and has two daughters, a stepdaughter, and three grandchildren. He lives in New York City with his wife, Bernadette Stein.

== Notes ==
- "Spin Glasses and Complexity", D.L. Stein and C.M. Newman (Princeton University Press, Princeton, NJ, 2013).
- "Spin Glasses", D.L. Stein, Scientific American 261, 52—59 (1989).
- Publications, Books, and Patents of Daniel L. Stein: http://www.physics.nyu.edu/~ds1752/allpubs.html
