= Acantholiparis caecus =

Scientific classification
- Domain: Eukaryota
- Kingdom: Animalia
- Phylum: Chordata
- Class: Actinopterygii
- Order: Perciformes
- Suborder: Cottoidei
- Family: Liparidae
- Genus: Acantholiparis
- Species: A. caecus

Binomial name
- Acantholiparis caecus Grinols, 1969

Species of fish

Acantholiparis caecus is one of the two snailfishes within the genus Acantholiparis, along with A. opercularis, the spiny snailfish. Its generic name comes from the Greek for thorny (akantha) and fat (liparis); its specific name comes from the Latin word for blind.

== Biology ==
Acantholiparis caecus grows to a maximum length of 5.7 cm, which is slightly less than what is known of its closest relative, the spiny snailfish. Females are larger than males, whose maximum size is 3.9 cm.

== Habitat ==
Acantholiparis caecus is known from depths stretching from 1,300m to 2,122m, in the bathyal or midnight zone of the ocean. Unlike the spiny snailfish, it is pelagic, living above the ocean floor rather than upon it as the demersal spiny snailfish does.

== Distribution ==
Acantholiparis caecus is a more southern fish than A. opercularis, inhabiting an area off the coast of Oregon and northern California. Possibly the range extends as far north as British Columbia but this is unconfirmed.
