= Psednos groenlandicus =

Scientific classification
- Kingdom: Animalia
- Phylum: Chordata
- Class: Actinopterygii
- Order: Perciformes
- Suborder: Cottoidei
- Family: Liparidae
- Genus: Psednos
- Species: P. groenlandicus

Binomial name
- Psednos groenlandicus Chernova, 2001

Species of fish

Psednos groenlandicus, also known as the Greenland dwarf snailfish, is a species of snailfish found in the north-western Atlantic Ocean.

== Description ==
This species reaches a length of 5.3 cm (2.1 in). Their lips are thin and the lower jaw is slightly projecting. Their gill slits are nearly vertical.

Members of the genus Psednos have a strongly humped-back with its upper profile rising abruptly from the short snout. The snout is slanted and blunt. Their pectoral fins are notched with short intermedial notched rays that are clearly bidobed. Its appearance is overall most similar to Psednos harteli. It differs from that species with P. groenlandicus having a lower lobe rays that are elongated and thin, a short mouth, a shorter upper jaw compared to the lower jaw, and other minor features.

== Distribution ==
This species is distributed in the north-western Atlantic Ocean in areas such as Greenland. They live in depths ranging from 930-1055 meters.
