= Psednos whitleyi =

Scientific classification
- Kingdom: Animalia
- Phylum: Chordata
- Class: Actinopterygii
- Order: Perciformes
- Suborder: Cottoidei
- Family: Liparidae
- Genus: Psednos
- Species: P. whitleyi

Binomial name
- Psednos whitleyi Stein, Chernova & Andriashev, 2001

Species of fish

Psednos whitleyi, the bigcheek snailfish, is a species of snailfish found in the eastern Indian Ocean.

== Size ==
This species reaches a length of 9.1 cm (3.6 in).

== Etymology ==
The fish is named in honor of Gilbert P. Whitley (1903–1975).
