= Psednos micrurus =

Conservation status
- Data Deficient (IUCN 3.1)

Scientific classification
- Kingdom: Animalia
- Phylum: Chordata
- Class: Actinopterygii
- Order: Perciformes
- Suborder: Cottoidei
- Family: Liparidae
- Genus: Psednos
- Species: P. micrurus

Binomial name
- Psednos micrurus Barnard, 1927

Species of fish

Psednos micrurus, also known as Barnard's dwarf snailfish, is a species of snailfish found in the south-western Pacific Ocean.

== Size ==
This species reaches a length of 4.5 cm (1.8 in).
