= Psednos sargassicus =

Scientific classification
- Domain: Eukaryota
- Kingdom: Animalia
- Phylum: Chordata
- Class: Actinopterygii
- Order: Perciformes
- Suborder: Cottoidei
- Family: Liparidae
- Genus: Psednos
- Species: P. sargassicus

Binomial name
- Psednos sargassicus Chernova, 2001

Species of fish

Psednos sargassicus, the Sargasso dwarf snailfish, is a species of snailfish found in the north-eastern Atlantic Ocean.

== Size ==
This species reaches a length of 5.2 cm (2.0 in).
