= Psednos pallidus =

Scientific classification
- Kingdom: Animalia
- Phylum: Chordata
- Class: Actinopterygii
- Order: Perciformes
- Suborder: Cottoidei
- Family: Liparidae
- Genus: Psednos
- Species: P. pallidus

Binomial name
- Psednos pallidus Chernova & Stein, 2002

Species of fish

Psednos pallidus is a species of snailfish found in the eastern-central Pacific Ocean.

== Size ==
This species reaches a length of 7.1 cm (2.8 in).
