= Psednos gelatinosus =

Scientific classification
- Domain: Eukaryota
- Kingdom: Animalia
- Phylum: Chordata
- Class: Actinopterygii
- Order: Perciformes
- Suborder: Cottoidei
- Family: Liparidae
- Genus: Psednos
- Species: P. gelatinosus

Binomial name
- Psednos gelatinosus Chernova, 2001

Species of fish

Psednos gelatinosus, the gelatinous dwarf snailfish, is a species of snailfish found in the north-eastern Atlantic Ocean off the coast of south-eastern Greenland.

== Size ==
This species reaches a length of 6.5 cm (2.6 in).
