= Psednos delawarei =

Scientific classification
- Kingdom: Animalia
- Phylum: Chordata
- Class: Actinopterygii
- Order: Perciformes
- Suborder: Cottoidei
- Family: Liparidae
- Genus: Psednos
- Species: P. delawarei

Binomial name
- Psednos delawarei Chernova & Stein, 2002

Species of fish

Psednos delawarei is a species of snailfish found in the south-western Pacific Ocean.

== Size ==
This species reaches a length of 3.5 cm (1.4 in).

== Etymology ==
The fish is named for the NOAA (National Oceanic and Atmospheric Administration) ship Delaware II, from which the holotype specimen was collected.
