= Elassodiscus caudatus =

Scientific classification
- Kingdom: Animalia
- Phylum: Chordata
- Class: Actinopterygii
- Order: Perciformes
- Suborder: Cottoidei
- Family: Liparidae
- Genus: Elassodiscus
- Species: E. caudatus

Binomial name
- Elassodiscus caudatus (Gilbert, 1915)

Synonyms
- Paraliparis caudatus

Species of fish

Elassodiscus caudatus, the blackbelly snailfish, is a species of snailfish. It is found in the Eastern Pacific from the eastern Bering Sea and southeastern Alaska to Monterey Bay, California.
