= Psednos mexicanus =

Scientific classification
- Kingdom: Animalia
- Phylum: Chordata
- Class: Actinopterygii
- Order: Perciformes
- Suborder: Cottoidei
- Family: Liparidae
- Genus: Psednos
- Species: P. mexicanus

Binomial name
- Psednos mexicanus Chernova & Stein, 2002

Species of fish

Psednos mexicanus is a species of snailfish found in the eastern-central Pacific Ocean.

== Size ==
This species reaches a length of 5.9 cm (2.3 in).
