= Aetheliparis taurocanis =

Scientific classification
- Kingdom: Animalia
- Phylum: Chordata
- Class: Actinopterygii
- Order: Perciformes
- Suborder: Cottoidei
- Family: Liparidae
- Genus: Aetheliparis
- Species: A. taurocanis

Binomial name
- Aetheliparis taurocanis Stein, 2001

Species of fish

Aetheliparis taurocanis is a species of snailfish found in the south-western Pacific Ocean.

== Size ==
This species reaches a length of 3.2 cm (1.3 in).

== Etymology ==
The fish is named in honor of Daniel M. Cohen (1930-2017), of the Natural History Museum of Los Angeles County, for his contributions to the knowledge of world fishes.
