= Psednos platyoperculosus =

Scientific classification
- Kingdom: Animalia
- Phylum: Chordata
- Class: Actinopterygii
- Order: Perciformes
- Suborder: Cottoidei
- Family: Liparidae
- Genus: Psednos
- Species: P. platyoperculosus

Binomial name
- Psednos platyoperculosus Stein, 2012

Species of fish

Psednos platyoperculosus is a species of snailfish found in the south-western Pacific Ocean.

== Size ==
This species reaches a length of 9.8 cm (3.9 in).
