= Psednos anoderkes =

Scientific classification
- Kingdom: Animalia
- Phylum: Chordata
- Class: Actinopterygii
- Order: Perciformes
- Suborder: Cottoidei
- Family: Liparidae
- Genus: Psednos
- Species: P. anoderkes

Binomial name
- Psednos anoderkes Chernova & Stein, 2002

Species of fish

Psednos anoderkes is a species of snailfish found in the eastern Pacific Ocean.

== Size ==
This species reaches a length of 2.7 cm (1.1 in).
