= Psednos carolinae =

Scientific classification
- Kingdom: Animalia
- Phylum: Chordata
- Class: Actinopterygii
- Order: Perciformes
- Suborder: Cottoidei
- Family: Liparidae
- Genus: Psednos
- Species: P. carolinae

Binomial name
- Psednos carolinae Stein, 2005

Species of fish

Psednos carolinae is a species of snailfish only known from a single male specimen collected in mid-Indian Ocean in 1964.

This fish, 39 mm standard length, has a slender body and large head with the mouth angled upwards 90°. It can be distinguished from all other Psednos species by the low number of vertebrae (38).
