= Psednos cathetostomus =

Scientific classification
- Kingdom: Animalia
- Phylum: Chordata
- Class: Actinopterygii
- Order: Perciformes
- Suborder: Cottoidei
- Family: Liparidae
- Genus: Psednos
- Species: P. cathetostomus

Binomial name
- Psednos cathetostomus Chernova & Stein, 2002

Species of fish

Psednos cathetostomus is a species of snailfish found in the eastern Pacific Ocean.

== Size ==
This species reaches a length of 4.3 cm (1.7 in).
