= Psednos microps =

Scientific classification
- Domain: Eukaryota
- Kingdom: Animalia
- Phylum: Chordata
- Class: Actinopterygii
- Order: Perciformes
- Suborder: Cottoidei
- Family: Liparidae
- Genus: Psednos
- Species: P. microps

Binomial name
- Psednos microps Chernova, 2001

Species of fish

Psednos microps, the smalleye dwarf snailfish, is a species of snailfish found in the western Indian Ocean.

== Size ==
This species reaches a length of 1.8 cm (0.71 in).
