= Psednos melanocephalus =

Scientific classification
- Kingdom: Animalia
- Phylum: Chordata
- Class: Actinopterygii
- Order: Perciformes
- Suborder: Cottoidei
- Family: Liparidae
- Genus: Psednos
- Species: P. melanocephalus

Binomial name
- Psednos melanocephalus Chernova & Stein, 2002

Species of fish

Psednos melanocephalus is a species of snailfish found in the north-western Atlantic Ocean.

== Size ==
This species reaches a length of 4.8 cm (1.9 in).
