= Psednos andriashevi =

Conservation status
- Data Deficient (IUCN 3.1)

Scientific classification
- Kingdom: Animalia
- Phylum: Chordata
- Class: Actinopterygii
- Order: Perciformes
- Suborder: Cottoidei
- Family: Liparidae
- Genus: Psednos
- Species: P. andriashevi

Binomial name
- Psednos andriashevi Chernova, 2001

Species of fish

Psednos andriashevi, also known as Andriashev's dwarf snailfish, is a species of snailfish found in the Northeast Atlantic Ocean just west of Ireland.

== Size ==
This species reaches a length of 5.3 cm (2.1 in).

== Etymology ==
The fish is named in honor of Russian ichthyologist Anatoly Petrovich Andriashev (1910-2009).
