= Psednos balushkini =

Scientific classification
- Kingdom: Animalia
- Phylum: Chordata
- Class: Actinopterygii
- Order: Perciformes
- Suborder: Cottoidei
- Family: Liparidae
- Genus: Psednos
- Species: P. balushkini

Binomial name
- Psednos balushkini Stein, Chernova & Andriashev, 2001

Species of fish

Psednos balushkini, the palemouth snailfish, is a species of snailfish found in the southwest Pacific Ocean.

== Size ==
This species reaches a length of 8.4 cm (3.3 in).
