= Psednos islandicus =

Scientific classification
- Kingdom: Animalia
- Phylum: Chordata
- Class: Actinopterygii
- Order: Perciformes
- Suborder: Cottoidei
- Family: Liparidae
- Genus: Psednos
- Species: P. islandicus

Binomial name
- Psednos islandicus Chernova & Stein, 2002

Species of fish

Psednos islandicus is a species of snailfish found in the north-eastern Atlantic Ocean.

== Size ==
This species reaches a length of 4.6 cm (1.8 in).
