= Psednos spirohira =

Conservation status
- Data Deficient (IUCN 3.1)

Scientific classification
- Kingdom: Animalia
- Phylum: Chordata
- Class: Actinopterygii
- Order: Perciformes
- Suborder: Cottoidei
- Family: Liparidae
- Genus: Psednos
- Species: P. spirohira

Binomial name
- Psednos spirohira Chernova & Stein, 2002

Species of fish

Psednos spirohira is a species of snailfish found in the north-eastern Atlantic Ocean.

== Size ==
This species reaches a length of 3.9 cm (1.5 in).
