= Psednos nataliae =

Scientific classification
- Kingdom: Animalia
- Phylum: Chordata
- Class: Actinopterygii
- Order: Perciformes
- Suborder: Cottoidei
- Family: Liparidae
- Genus: Psednos
- Species: P. nataliae

Binomial name
- Psednos nataliae Stein, & Andriyashev, 2001

Species of fish

Psednos nataliae is a species of snailfish found in the eastern Indian Ocean.

== Size ==
This species reaches a length of 9.9 cm (3.9 in).

== Etymology ==
The fish is named in honor of Natalia V. Chernova, of the Zoological Institute, Russian Academy of Sciences, for her contributions to the knowledge of Arctic fishes including snailfishes.
