= Psednos christinae =

Scientific classification
- Domain: Eukaryota
- Kingdom: Animalia
- Phylum: Chordata
- Class: Actinopterygii
- Order: Perciformes
- Suborder: Cottoidei
- Family: Liparidae
- Genus: Psednos
- Species: P. christinae

Binomial name
- Psednos christinae Andriashev, 2001

Species of fish

Psednos christinae, the European dwarf snailfish, is a species of snailfish found in the north-eastern Atlantic Ocean.

== Etymology ==
The fish is named in honor of German ichthyologist Christine Karrer.
