= Menziesichthys bacescui =

Scientific classification
- Kingdom: Animalia
- Phylum: Chordata
- Class: Actinopterygii
- Order: Perciformes
- Suborder: Cottoidei
- Family: Liparidae
- Genus: Menziesichthys
- Species: M. bacescui

Binomial name
- Menziesichthys bacescui Nalbant & R. F. Mayer, 1971

Species of fish

Menziesichthys bacescui is a species of marine ray-finned fish belonging to the family Liparidae, the snailfishes. This species is found in the Peru–Chile Trench in the eastern Pacific Ocean.

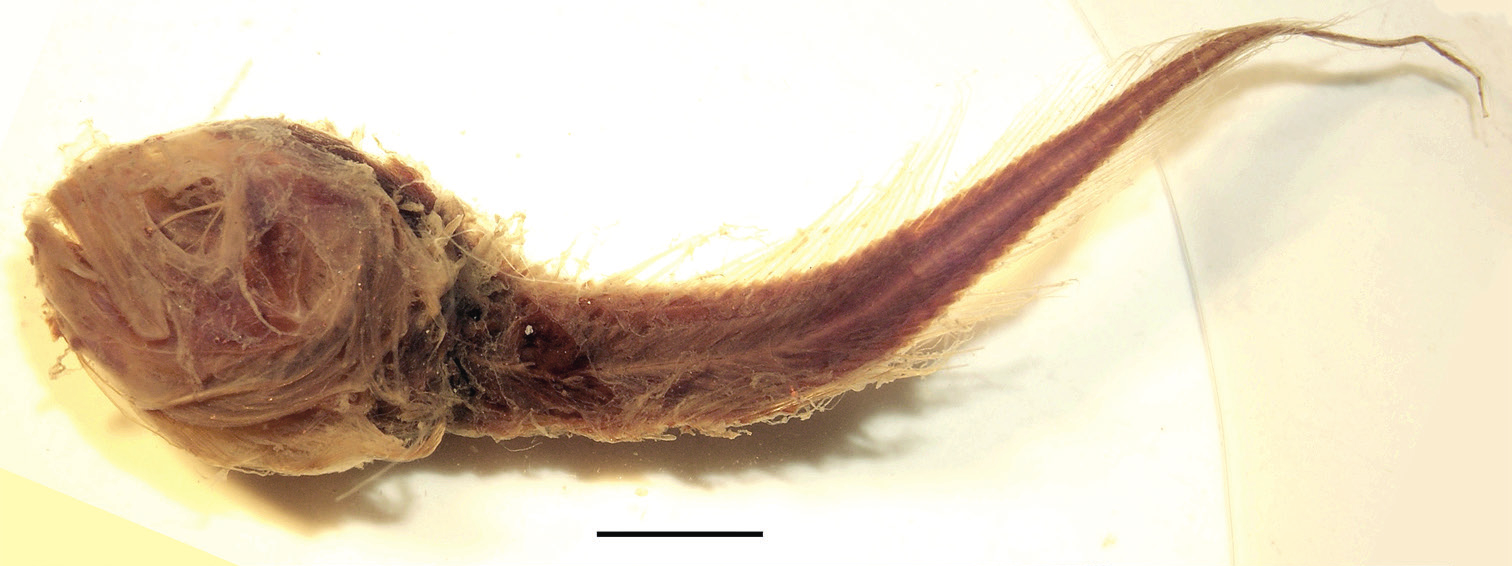
Holotype of M. bacescui, lateral view

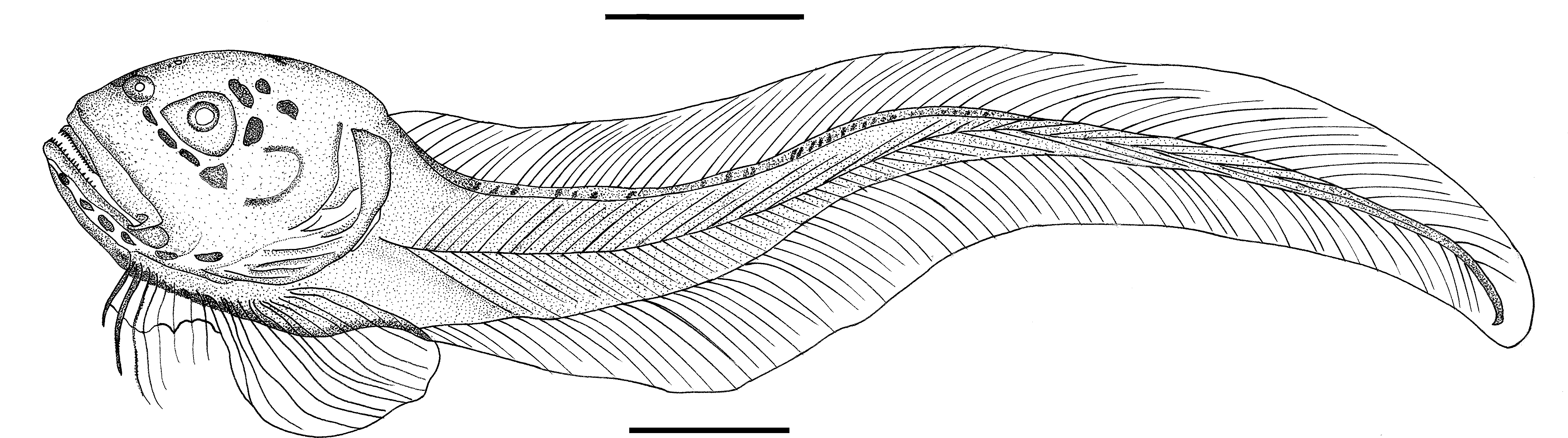
Restoration of the holotype, lateral view
