= Aetheliparis =

Scientific classification
- Kingdom: Animalia
- Phylum: Chordata
- Class: Actinopterygii
- Order: Perciformes
- Suborder: Cottoidei
- Family: Liparidae
- Genus: Aetheliparis; Stein, 2012

Type species
- Psednos rossi Chernova & Stein 2004

Genus of fishes

Aetheliparis is a genus of marine ray-finned fishes belonging to the family Liparidae, the snailfishes. One species known from the Atlantic Ocean off the coast of North America and the other from the Pacific Ocean near New Zealand.

== Taxonomy ==
Aetheliparis was first proposed as a genus in 2012 by David Leslie Stein. Stein was describing a new species of snailfish from New Zealand which was very similar to a species he and Natalia Valentina Chernova had described as Psednos rossi from the western North Atlantic in 2004. Stein designated P. rossi as the type species of the new genus Aetheliparis and included the new species, A. taurocanis, in the new genus. FishBase retains P. rossi in the genus Psednos and lists A. taurocanis as the only species in Aetheliparis despite the type species of Aetheliparis not being included.

== Species ==
There are currently two recognized species in this genus:

- Aetheliparis rossi (Chernova & Stein, 2004)
- Aetheliparis taurocanis Stein, 2012
