= Psednos griseus =

Scientific classification
- Kingdom: Animalia
- Phylum: Chordata
- Class: Actinopterygii
- Order: Perciformes
- Suborder: Cottoidei
- Family: Liparidae
- Genus: Psednos
- Species: P. griseus

Binomial name
- Psednos griseus Chernova & Stein, 2002

Species of fish

Psednos griseus is a species of snailfish found in the eastern Pacific Ocean.

== Size ==
This species reaches a length of 3.7 cm (1.5 in).
