= Notoliparis kermadecensis =

Scientific classification
- Domain: Eukaryota
- Kingdom: Animalia
- Phylum: Chordata
- Class: Actinopterygii
- Order: Perciformes
- Suborder: Cottoidei
- Family: Liparidae
- Genus: Notoliparis
- Species: N. kermadecensis

Binomial name
- Notoliparis kermadecensis (Nielsen, 1964)

Species of fish

Notoliparis kermadecensis (from Greek: noton, back, and liparos, fat) is a species of snailfish (Liparidae) that lives in the deep sea. Endemic to the Kermadec Trench in the Southwest Pacific, it is hadobenthic with a depth range between 6,474 and 7,561 m (21,240–24,806 ft), and can reach a standard length of up to 25.8 cm (10.2 in).

It is among the deepest living fish; in the Southern Hemisphere only Echiodon neotes has been recorded deeper, at 8,200–8,300 m (26,900–27,200 ft). A few species from the Northern Hemisphere have been recorded at similar or deeper depths than N. kermadecensis, including the snailfish Pseudoliparis amblystomopsis from the Kuril–Kamchatka and Japan Trenches. These two species apparently share a common ancestor and occupy similar hadal depth ranges, yet they can only survive at immense pressure and are geographically isolated, and their evolutionary history remains enigmatic. There are indications that the larvae of N. kermadecensis and other hadal snailfish spend time in the open water at relatively shallow depths, less than 1,000 m (3,300 ft).
