= Psednos struthersi =

Scientific classification
- Kingdom: Animalia
- Phylum: Chordata
- Class: Actinopterygii
- Order: Perciformes
- Suborder: Cottoidei
- Family: Liparidae
- Genus: Psednos
- Species: P. struthersi

Binomial name
- Psednos struthersi Stein, 2012

Species of fish

Psednos struthersi is a species of snailfish found in the south-western Pacific Ocean.

== Size ==
This species reaches a length of 4.8 cm (1.9 in).

== Etymology ==
The fish is named in honor of Carl D. Struthers, the Research & Technical Officer, at Fishes National Museum of New Zealand, Te Papa Tongarewa.
