= Psednos mirabilis =

Scientific classification
- Domain: Eukaryota
- Kingdom: Animalia
- Phylum: Chordata
- Class: Actinopterygii
- Order: Perciformes
- Suborder: Cottoidei
- Family: Liparidae
- Genus: Psednos
- Species: P. mirabilis

Binomial name
- Psednos mirabilis Chernova, 2001

Species of fish

Psednos mirabilis, the marvelous dwarf snailfish, is a species of snailfish found in the north-western Atlantic Ocean.

== Size ==
This species reaches a length of 2.8 cm (1.1 in).
