= Psednos micruroides =

Scientific classification
- Domain: Eukaryota
- Kingdom: Animalia
- Phylum: Chordata
- Class: Actinopterygii
- Order: Perciformes
- Suborder: Cottoidei
- Family: Liparidae
- Genus: Psednos
- Species: P. micruroides

Binomial name
- Psednos micruroides Chernova, 2001

Species of fish

Psednos micruroides, the multipore dwarf snailfish, is a species of snailfish found in the south-western Pacific Ocean.

== Size ==
This species reaches a length of 3.1 cm (1.2 in).
