= Psednos microstomus =

Scientific classification
- Kingdom: Animalia
- Phylum: Chordata
- Class: Actinopterygii
- Order: Perciformes
- Suborder: Cottoidei
- Family: Liparidae
- Genus: Psednos
- Species: P. microstomus

Binomial name
- Psednos microstomus Stein, 2012

Species of fish

Psednos microstomus is a species of snailfish found in the south-western Pacific Ocean.

== Size ==
This species reaches a length of 3.4 cm (1.3 in).
