= Psednos barnardi =

Scientific classification
- Kingdom: Animalia
- Phylum: Chordata
- Class: Actinopterygii
- Order: Perciformes
- Suborder: Cottoidei
- Family: Liparidae
- Genus: Psednos
- Species: P. barnardi

Binomial name
- Psednos barnardi Chernova, 2001

Species of fish

Psednos barnardi, the blackchin dwarf snailfish, is a species of snailfish found in the north-western Atlantic Ocean.

== Size ==
This species reaches a length of 3.4 cm (1.3 in).

== Etymology ==
The fish is named in honor of Keppel Harcourt Barnard (1887-1964), of the South African Museum, who was the one who proposed the genus Psednos in 1927.
