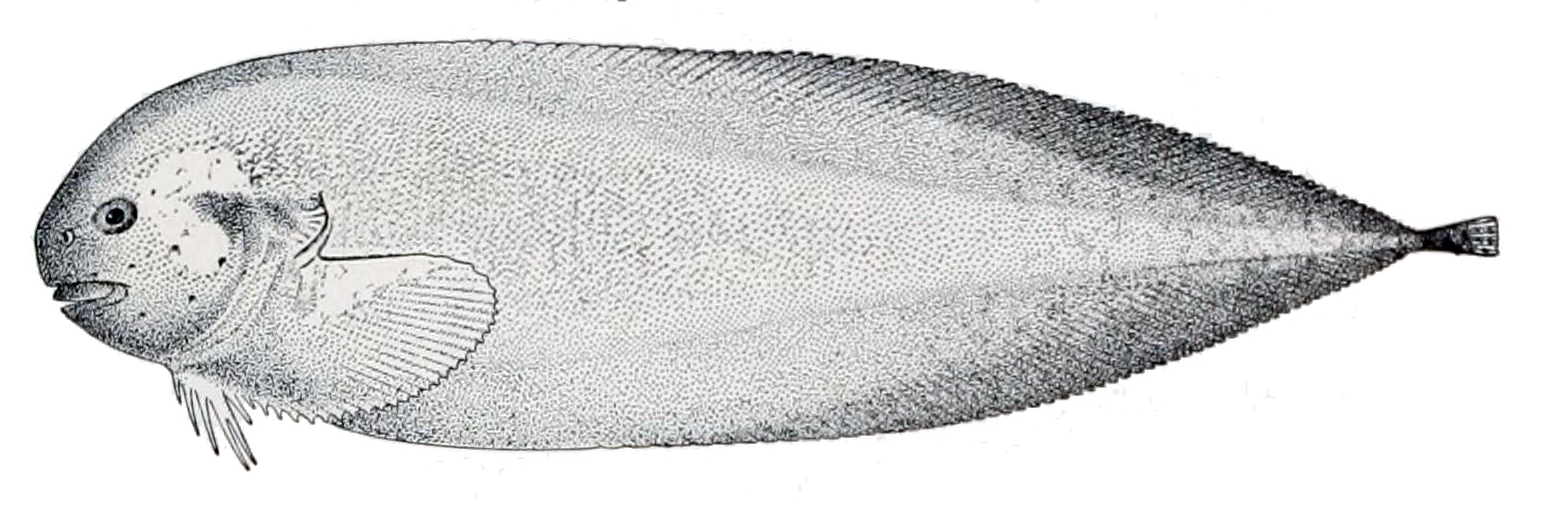

Scientific classification
- Kingdom: Animalia
- Phylum: Chordata
- Class: Actinopterygii
- Division: Teleostei
- Order: Perciformes
- Suborder: Cottoidei
- Family: Liparidae
- Genus: Elassodiscus
- Species: E. tremebundus

Binomial name
- Elassodiscus tremebundus Gilbert and Burke, 1912

= Elassodiscus tremebundus =

Species of snailfish

Elassodiscus tremebundus, the dimdisc snailfish, is a species of snailfish which is found in the Pacific Ocean, specifically in the Bering Sea, Sea of Okhotsk, Aleutian Islands, eastern coast of Kamchatka, Kuril Islands, and Hokkaido, Japan.

== Taxonomy ==
The genus name Elassodiscus was first described by Gilbert & Burke in 1912, the species E. tremebundus being described in the same year. The genus name comes from the Greek words 'elasson' (έλασσον) meaning 'smaller' and diskos (δίσκος) meaning 'disc'. This may be in reference to a smaller adhesive disc (a common characteristic in many snailfish species aside from those in the genera Paraliparis and Nectoliparis) than other genera of snailfish. The etymology of the species name tremebundus is unclear/not well documented.

== Description ==
Elassodiscus tremebundus is a comparatively medium-sized species of snailfish. It makes its home in bathydemersal depths of up to 1,800 m (5,905.5 ft) and reaches lengths of up to 34.4 cm (13.5 in) (recorded).
