= Psednos steini =

Scientific classification
- Domain: Eukaryota
- Kingdom: Animalia
- Phylum: Chordata
- Class: Actinopterygii
- Order: Perciformes
- Suborder: Cottoidei
- Family: Liparidae
- Genus: Psednos
- Species: P. steini

Binomial name
- Psednos steini Chernova, 2001

Species of fish

Psednos steini, also known as Stein's dwarf snailfish, is a species of snailfish found in the south-western Pacific Ocean.

== Size ==
This species reaches a length of 3.7 cm (1.5 in).

== Etymology ==
The fish is named in honor of ichthyologist David L. Stein, of Oregon State University.
