= Notoliparis antonbruuni =

Scientific classification
- Kingdom: Animalia
- Phylum: Chordata
- Class: Actinopterygii
- Division: Teleostei
- Order: Perciformes
- Suborder: Cottoidei
- Family: Liparidae
- Genus: Notoliparis
- Species: N. antonbruuni

Binomial name
- Notoliparis antonbruuni Stein, 2005

Species of fish

Notoliparis antonbruuni is a species of snailfish. It was described in 2005 from a single poorly preserved specimen collected in 1966 from the hadal zone off Callao, Peru.

Despite its poor condition, this specimen clearly represents a distinct species although it was unclear which genus the species should be placed in. Notoliparis was chosen rather than Careproctus or Pseudoliparis due to the location the new species was collected being close to the distribution of other Notoliparis species.

This fish differs from related species in several respects including having a smaller eye, a larger distance between the anus and the origin of the anal fin and in the structure of the pectoral fin.

This is one of only four snailfish species recorded from a depth of below 6000 m. The specific name honours the R/V Anton Bruun, the research ship from which the specimen was collected.
