= Aetheliparis rossi =

Scientific classification
- Kingdom: Animalia
- Phylum: Chordata
- Class: Actinopterygii
- Order: Perciformes
- Suborder: Cottoidei
- Family: Liparidae
- Genus: Aetheliparis
- Species: A. rossi

Binomial name
- Aetheliparis rossi (Chernova & Stein, 2004)

Synonyms
- Psednos rossi Chernova & Stein, 2004

Species of fish

Aetheliparis rossi is a species of snailfish only known from the mesopelagic zone in the North Atlantic off Cape Hatteras, North Carolina. This species is found at depths of from 500 to 674 metres (1,640 to 2,211 ft).

== Taxonomy ==
Aetheliparis rossi was first formally described as Psednos rossi in 2004 by Natalia Vladimirovna Chernova and David Leslie Stein with its type locality given as off Cape Hatteras in the western North Atlantic. In 2012 Stein described a new species from the southwestern Pacific Ocean, very similar to P. rossi, and he classified both species in the new genus Aetheliparis with P. rossi designated as its type species. The specific name honors Steve W. Ross of the University of North Carolina Center for Marine Science, who notified Chernova and Stein of the collection of this snailfish and provided the with specimens for study.

== Description ==
Aetheliparis rossi is an orange-pink fish around 3.7 centimetres (1.5 in) SL with a very large mouth with a vertical opening. It has a straight spine.
