= Gloved snailfish =

Scientific classification
- Kingdom: Animalia
- Phylum: Chordata
- Class: Actinopterygii
- Order: Perciformes
- Suborder: Cottoidei
- Family: Liparidae
- Genus: Palmoliparis; Balushkin, 1996
- Species: P. beckeri

Binomial name
- Palmoliparis beckeri Balushkin, 1996

Species of fish

The gloved snailfish (Palmoliparis beckeri) is a species of snailfish found around the northern Kuril Islands in the northwestern Pacific Ocean. It is the only species in the genus Palmoliparis. This species can be found at depths of from 200 to 800 m (660 to 2,620 ft). This species grows to a length of 42 centimetres (17 in) TL though more usually around 29.6 cm (11.7 in) TL. The maximum known weight for this species is 1,080 g (38 oz).
