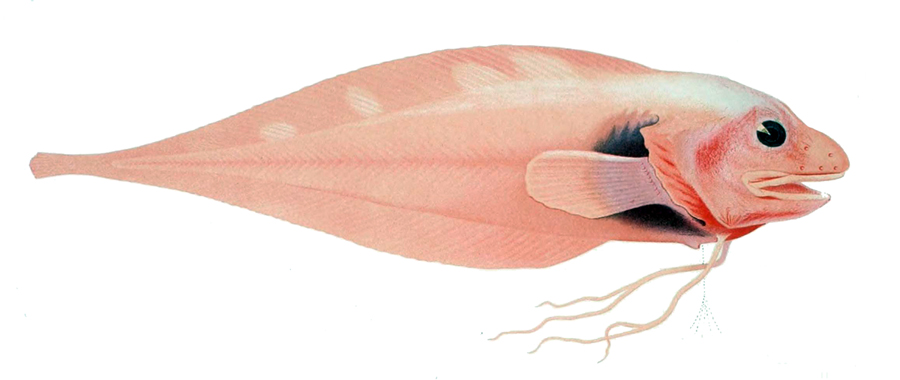
- Rhodichthys regina

Scientific classification
- Kingdom: Animalia
- Phylum: Chordata
- Class: Actinopterygii
- Order: Perciformes
- Suborder: Cottoidei
- Family: Liparidae
- Genus: Rhodichthys; Collett, 1879

Type species
- Rhodichthys regina Collett, 1879

= Rhodichthys =

Genus of fishes

Rhodichthys is a genus of marine ray-finned fishes belonging to the family Liparidae, the snailfishes. These fishes are found in the northeast Atlantic and Arctic Oceans.

== Species ==
Rhodichthys has two currently recognised species within it:

- Rhodichthys melanocephalus Andriashev & Chernova, 2011 (Blackhead strainer snailfish)
- Rhodichthys regina Collett, 1879 (Threadfin snailfish)
