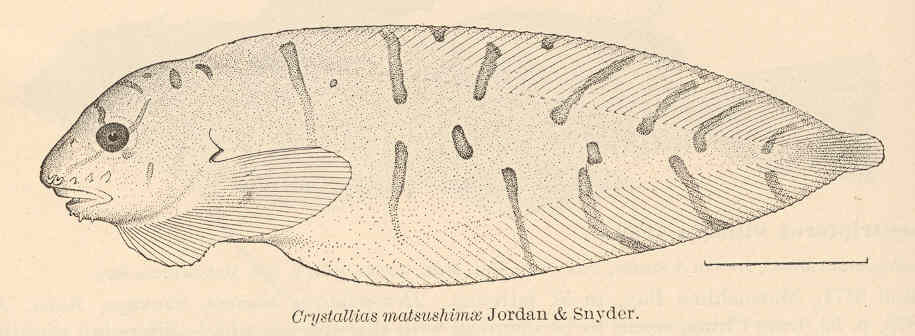

Scientific classification
- Kingdom: Animalia
- Phylum: Chordata
- Class: Actinopterygii
- Division: Teleostei
- Order: Perciformes
- Suborder: Cottoidei
- Family: Liparidae
- Genus: Crystallias; Jordan & Snyder, 1902
- Species: C. matsushimae

Binomial name
- Crystallias matsushimae Jordan & Snyder, 1902

Synonyms
- Crystallichthys matsushimae Jordan & Snyder, 1902; Crystallias kamoae Oshima 1957

= Crystallias =

Genus of marine ray-finned fish

Crystallias is a monospecific genus of marine ray-finned fish belonging to the family Liparidae. It only species, Crystallias matsushimae, the barred snailfish, is found in the northwestern Pacific Ocean, from the Sea of Japan and the Pacific coast of Honshu to the Bering Sea. It is found at depths of from 30 to 700 metres (98 to 2,297 ft). This species can grows up to a length of 38 centimetres (15 in) TL.

As for other snailfishes, Crystallias matsushimae inhabits the benthic zone, and attaches itself to rocks with fused, suction-cup-like pelvic fins while resting. At rest, this species typically curls the tail forwards.

Male individuals possess a pointed snout, whereas females have a rounded snout.

In the Russian zone of the Sea of Japan, the preferred depth range of Crystallias matsushimae has been recorded to vary by season, living at depths of 201-300 metres in summer and autumn, and moving to depths of 401-500 metres in winter. In the same region, it is recorded being caught in areas with bottom water temperature between -0.5°C and 2.5°C. It's diet is primarily composed of amphipods and mysids, with lesser quantities of decapods and polychaetes. Large individuals may also consume small fishes.

Two colour morphotypes of the species are known - a red morphotype from the northern Sea of Japan, southern Sea of Okhotsk, and the Pacific coast of Japan, and a yellow morphotype restricted to the southern Sea of Japan. The two are separated by colour, markings, and fin ray counts of the pectoral and anal fins. These morphs may represent distinct species or subspecies.The evolution of these two morphotypes is thought to have occurred by allopatric speciation, due to the poor dispersal abilities of the species (as it lays large, demersal eggs with no planktonic larval stage) resulting in geographic isolation.

The species has been displayed by some public aquaria in Japan, including Aquamarine Fukushima (red morphotype), Uozu Aquarium (yellow morphotype), and Otaru Aquarium (red morphotype).
