= Hardhead snailfish =

Scientific classification
- Kingdom: Animalia
- Phylum: Chordata
- Class: Actinopterygii
- Order: Perciformes
- Suborder: Cottoidei
- Family: Liparidae
- Genus: Lopholiparis; J. W. Orr, 2004
- Species: L. flerxi

Binomial name
- Lopholiparis flerxi J. W. Orr, 2004

Species of fish

The hardhead snailfish (Lopholiparis flerxi) is a species of marine ray-finned fish belonging to the family Liparidae, the snailfishes. This species is found in the northern Pacific Ocean where a single specimen (the holotype) was collected in June 2000 from near the Aleutian Islands at a depth of 285 m (935 ft). The length of the fish was 3.3 cm (1.3 in) SL. This species is the only member of the monospecific genus Lopholiparis. The specific name honors the collector of the holotype, William C. Flerx of the National Marine Fisheries Service.
