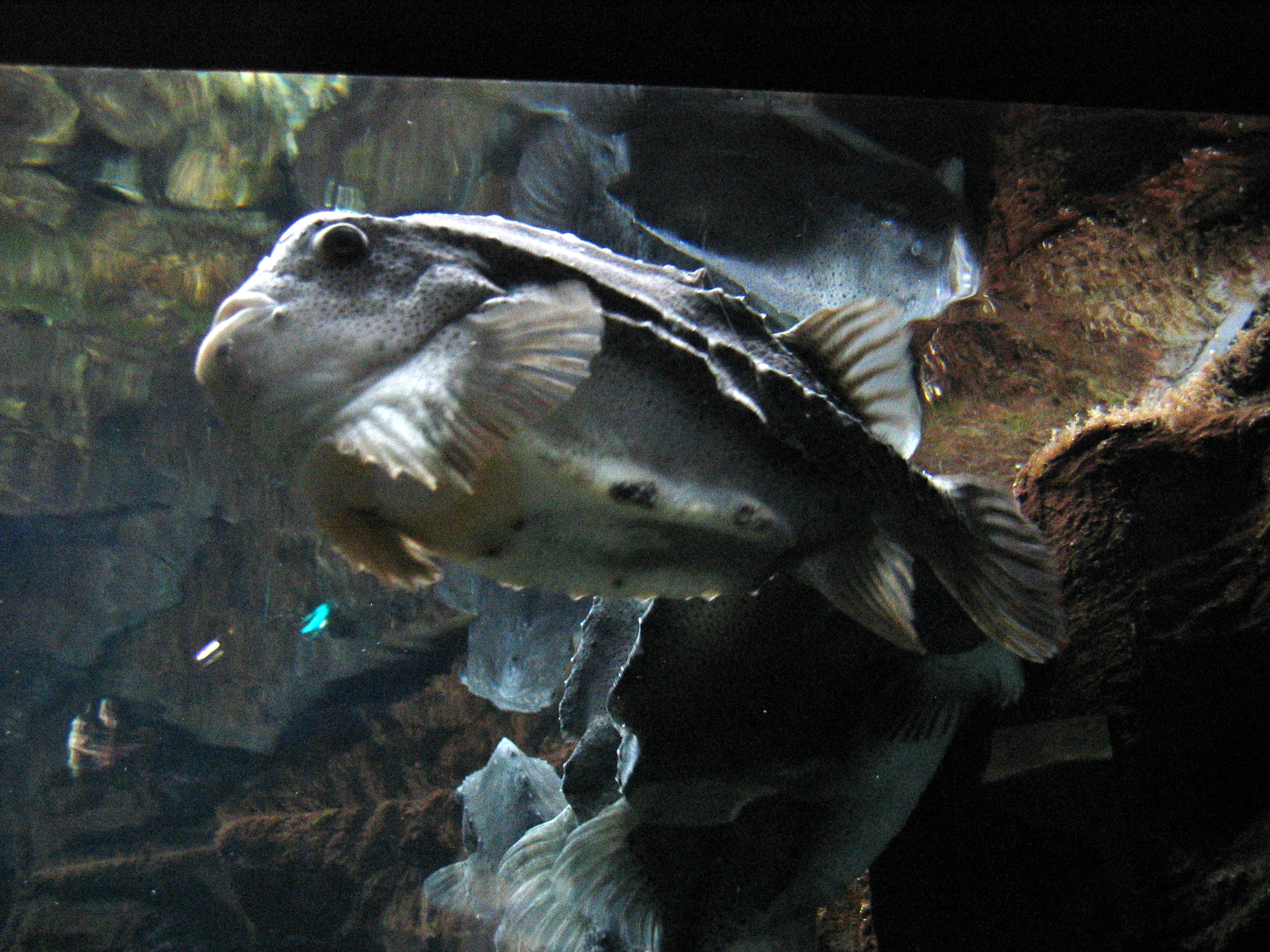
- Cyclopterus lumpus
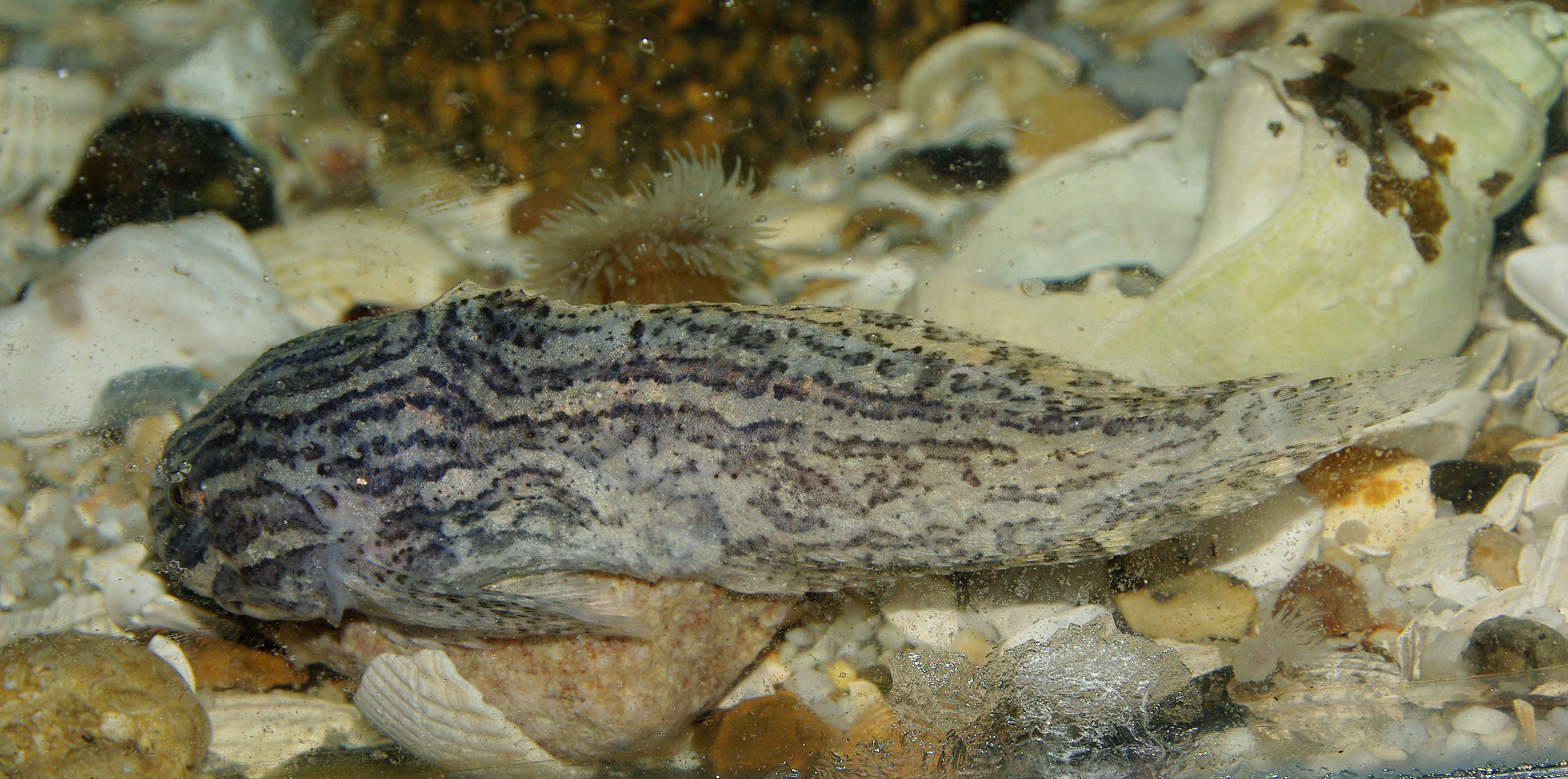
- Liparis liparis

Scientific classification
- Kingdom: Animalia
- Phylum: Chordata
- Class: Actinopterygii
- Order: Perciformes
- Suborder: Cottoidei
- Superfamily: Cyclopteroidea; Gill, 1873

Families
- see text

= Cyclopteroidea =

Superfamily of ray-finned fishes

Cyclopteroidea is a superfamily of ray-finned fishes within the order Scorpaeniformes. The superfamily comprises 2 families, the Cyclopteridae, the lumpsuckers, of the cool northern seas and the widespread Liparidae, the snailfishes. A common feature shared by these families is that they typically have the pelvic fins modified to form a disc shaped sucker.

== Taxonomy ==
Cyclopteroidea was first proposed as a taxonomic grouping in 1873 by the American biologist Theodore Gill to include the Cycopteridae and the Liparidae as relatives of the Cottidae. The 5th edition of Fishes of the World classifies the superfamily within the suborder Cottoidei of the order Scorpaeniformes. Other authorities do not recognise the superfamily and classify the two families, Cyclopteridae and Liparidae, within the infraorder Cottales alongside the sculpins, within the order Perciformes. An osteological analysis found that the genus Bathylutichthys was intermediate between the Psychrolutidae and the two families making up the Cyclopteroidea, meaning that those two families would not be supported as a superfamily within the Cottoidei.

== Families ==
The following 2 families are classified under Cyclopteroidea:

- Cyclopteridae Bonaparte, 1831 (Lumpfishes or lumpsuckers)
- Liparidae Gill, 1861 (Snailfishes)

== Characteristics ==
Cyclopteroidea have pelvic fins, if present, that are placed on the thorax and modified into a disc which uses suction to attach to the substrate. They lack vomerine teeth. They typically do not possess a lateral line and have only a small gill opening.

== Distribution and habitat ==
Cyclopteroidea are widely distributed, especially the snailfishes in the family Liparidae which are found throughout the world's seas and are an important component of the fish fauna of the Southern Ocean and they are found in a wide range of habitats and depths, including very deep water. The lumpsuckers of the family Cyclopteridae are restricted to the cooler waters of the Northern Hemisphere with most species being benthic on the continental shelf and upper continental slop with a few species found in very deep waters.
