= Squaloliparis =

Scientific classification
- Kingdom: Animalia
- Phylum: Chordata
- Class: Actinopterygii
- Order: Perciformes
- Suborder: Cottoidei
- Family: Liparidae
- Genus: Squaloliparis; Pitruk & Fedorov, 1993
- Species: S. dentatus

Binomial name
- Squaloliparis dentatus (Kido, 1988)

Synonyms
- Careproctus dentatus Kido, 1988

Species of fish

Squaloliparis is a monospecific genus of marine ray-finned fish belonging to the family Liparidae, the snailfishes. Its only species is Squaloliparis dentatus which is found in the northwestern Pacific Ocean, known from the region from Hokkaido to western Kamchatka. This species has been found at depths of from 190 to 900 metres (620 to 2,950 ft). It grows to a length of 35.4 centimetres (13.9 in) SL.
