= Menziesichthys =

Scientific classification
- Kingdom: Animalia
- Phylum: Chordata
- Class: Actinopterygii
- Order: Perciformes
- Suborder: Cottoidei
- Family: Liparidae
- Genus: Menziesichthys; Nalbant & R. F. Mayer, 1971

Type species
- Menziesichthys bacescui Nalbant & Prokofiev, 1971

Species of fish

Menziesichthys is a genus of marine ray-finned fishes belonging to the family Liparidae, the snail fishes. These are deep water fishes found in the Pacific Ocean.

== Species ==
Menziesichthys contains two recognised species:

- Menziesichthys alaid Prokofiev & Iftime, 2020
- Menziesichthys bacescui Nalbant & R. F. Mayer, 1971
