= Bathylutichthys taranetzi =

Scientific classification
- Kingdom: Animalia
- Phylum: Chordata
- Class: Actinopterygii
- Order: Perciformes
- Suborder: Cottoidei
- Family: Psychrolutidae
- Genus: Bathylutichthys
- Species: B. taranetzi

Binomial name
- Bathylutichthys taranetzi Balushkin & Voskoboinikova, 1990

Species of fish

Bathylutichthys taranetzi is a fish in the genus Bathylutichthys. It is a deep-sea fish with a standard length of about 10 cm (3.9 in), and has been found exclusively in the vicinity of the South Georgia Island in the Southern Ocean at depths of 1,650 m (5,410 ft).

== Etymology ==
The fish is named in honor of the Soviet ichthyologist Anatoly Yakovlevich Taranetz (1910-1941).
