= Prognatholiparis =

Conservation status
- Data Deficient (IUCN 3.1)

Scientific classification
- Kingdom: Animalia
- Phylum: Chordata
- Class: Actinopterygii
- Order: Perciformes
- Suborder: Cottoidei
- Family: Liparidae
- Genus: Prognatholiparis; J. W. Orr & Busby, 2001
- Species: P. ptychomandibularis

Binomial name
- Prognatholiparis ptychomandibularis J. W. Orr & Busby, 2001

Species of fish

Prognatholiparis, is a monospecific genus of marine ray-finned fish belonging to the family Liparidae, the snailfishes. It only species is Prognatholiparis ptychomandibularis, the wrinkle-jaw snailfish, which is found in the northeastern Pacific Ocean from near Seguam Island in the Aleutian Islands. It occurs at a depth of around 455 metres (1,493 ft). This species grows to a length of 8.8 centimetres (3.5 in) SL.
