= Psednos harteli =

Conservation status
- Data Deficient (IUCN 3.1)

Scientific classification
- Kingdom: Animalia
- Phylum: Chordata
- Class: Actinopterygii
- Order: Perciformes
- Suborder: Cottoidei
- Family: Liparidae
- Genus: Psednos
- Species: P. harteli

Binomial name
- Psednos harteli Chernova, 2001

Species of fish

Psednos harteli, also known as Hartel's dwarf snailfish, is a species of snailfish found in the north-western Atlantic Ocean.

== Size ==
This species reaches a length of 4.8 cm (1.9 in).

== Etymology ==
The fish is named in honor of Karsten E. Hartel, a Curatorial Associate in Ichthyology, at the Museum of Comparative Zoology, at the Harvard University, who loaned specimens and read the manuscript.
