= Gyrinichthys =

Scientific classification
- Kingdom: Animalia
- Phylum: Chordata
- Class: Actinopterygii
- Order: Perciformes
- Suborder: Cottoidei
- Family: Liparidae
- Genus: Gyrinichthys; C. H. Gilbert, 1896
- Species: G. minytremus

Binomial name
- Gyrinichthys minytremus C. H. Gilbert, 1896

Species of fish

Gyrinichthys is a monospecific genus of marine ray-finned fish belonging to the family Liparidae, the snailfishes. It only species is Gyrinichthys minytremus which is found in the northeastern Pacific Ocean where a single specimen was found once at a depth of 640 metres (2,100 ft) near Unalaska island.
