= Polypera =

Scientific classification
- Kingdom: Animalia
- Phylum: Chordata
- Class: Actinopterygii
- Order: Perciformes
- Suborder: Cottoidei
- Family: Liparidae
- Genus: Polypera; Burke, 1912
- Species: P. simushirae

Binomial name
- Polypera simushirae (C. H. Gilbert & Burke, 1912)

Species of fish

Polypera is a monotypic genus of marine ray-finned fish belonging to the family Liparidae, the snailfishes. Its only species is Polypera simushirae which is found in the northwestern Pacific Ocean at depths down to 833 metres (2,733 ft). This species grows to a length of 77 centimetres (30 in) TL and has been recorded at a maximum weight of 11 kilograms (24 lb). This species is the only known member of its genus. It is probably the largest of the snailfishes.
