= Pygmy snailfish =

Scientific classification
- Kingdom: Animalia
- Phylum: Chordata
- Class: Actinopterygii
- Order: Perciformes
- Suborder: Cottoidei
- Family: Liparidae
- Genus: Lipariscus; C. H. Gilbert, 1915
- Species: L. nanus

Binomial name
- Lipariscus nanus C. H. Gilbert, 1915

Species of fish

The pygmy snailfish (Lipariscus nanus) species of marine ray-finned fish belonging to the family Liparidae, the snailfishes. This species is found in the northern Pacific Ocean where it occurs in deep waters down to 910 metres (2,990 ft). The range is broad, extending from the Sea of Okhotsk (off Hokkaido) north to the western Bering Sea, and from Monterey Bay, California, north to the Gulf of Alaska. This species grows to a length of 6.3 centimetres (2.5 in) SL in males and to 7.1 centimetres (2.8 in) SL in females. It is the only known member of the genus Lipariscus.
