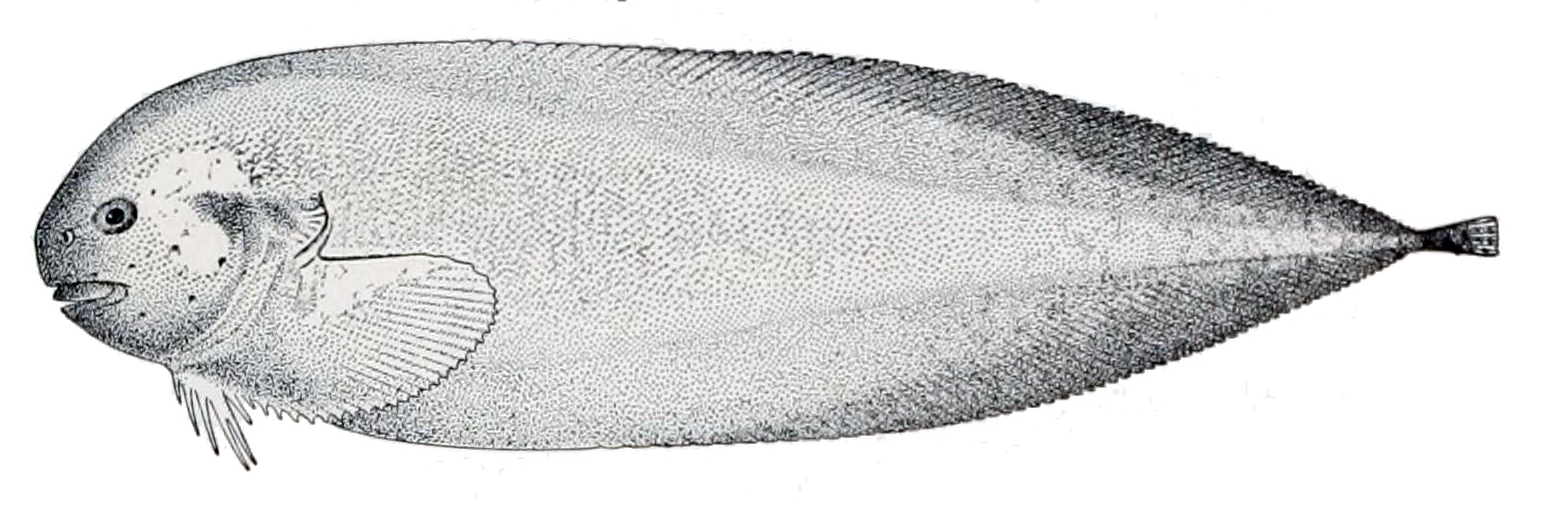
- E. tremebundus

Scientific classification
- Kingdom: Animalia
- Phylum: Chordata
- Class: Actinopterygii
- Order: Perciformes
- Suborder: Cottoidei
- Family: Liparidae
- Genus: Elassodiscus; C. H. Gilbert & Burke, 1912

Type species
- Elassodiscus tremebundus C. H. Gilbert & Burke, 1912

= Elassodiscus =

Genus of fishes

Elassodiscus is a genus of marine ray-finned fishes belonging to the family Liparidae, the snailfishes. These fishes are found in the Pacific Ocean.

== Species ==
There are currently three recognized species in this genus:

- Elassodiscus caudatus (C. H. Gilbert, 1915) (Blackbelly snailfish)
- Elassodiscus obscurus Pitruk & Fedorov, 1993
- Elassodiscus tremebundus C. H. Gilbert & Burke, 1912
