= Pseudonotoliparis =

Scientific classification
- Kingdom: Animalia
- Phylum: Chordata
- Class: Actinopterygii
- Order: Perciformes
- Suborder: Cottoidei
- Family: Liparidae
- Genus: Pseudonotoliparis; Pitruk, 1991
- Species: P. rassi

Binomial name
- Pseudonotoliparis rassi Pitruk, 1991

Species of fish

Pseudonotoliparis rassi, or Rass' snailfish, is a species of snailfish native to the northwestern Pacific Ocean where it is known from the Boussole Strait in the Kuril Islands. This species has been found at a depth of 2,200 metres (7,200 ft). This species grows to a length of 8.8 centimetres (3.5 in) SL. This species is the only known member of the monospecific genus Pseudonotoliparis.
