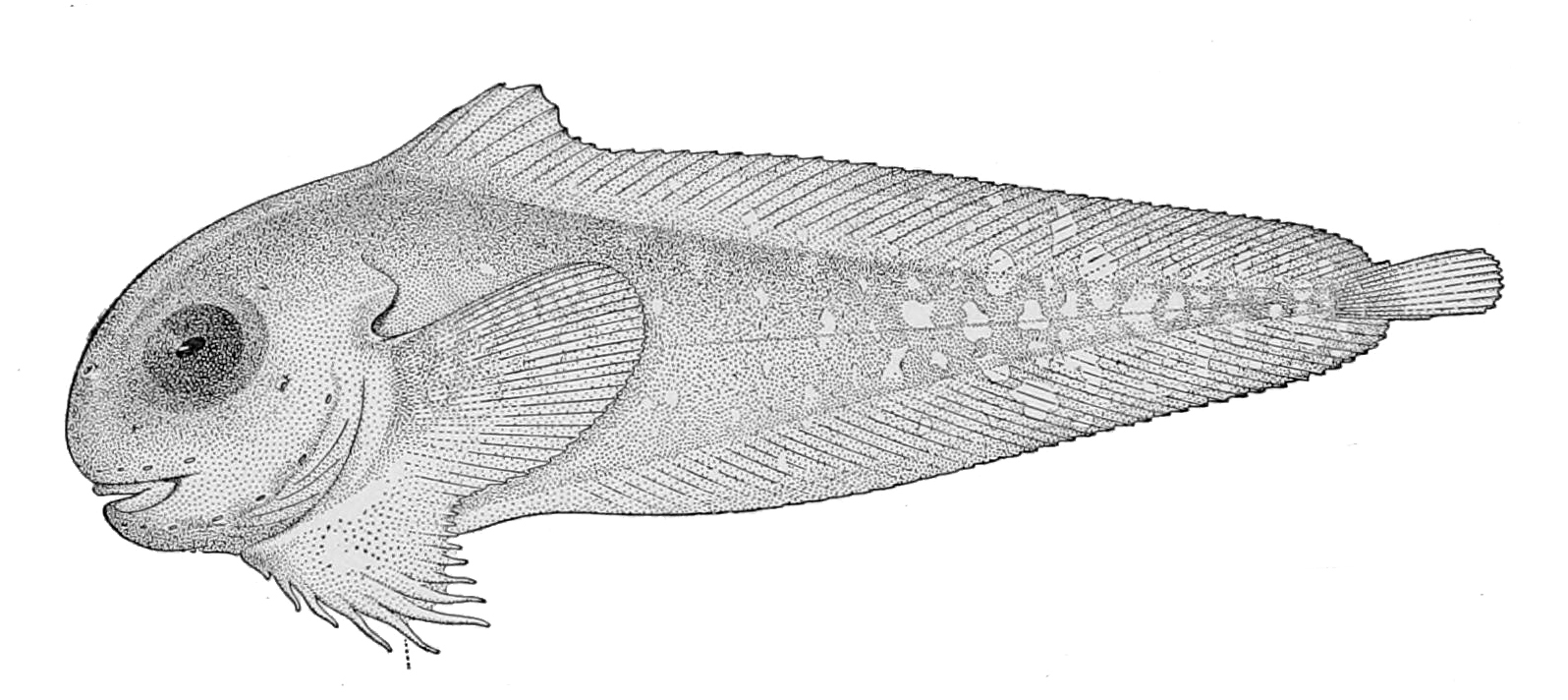

Scientific classification
- Kingdom: Animalia
- Phylum: Chordata
- Class: Actinopterygii
- Order: Perciformes
- Suborder: Cottoidei
- Family: Liparidae
- Genus: Temnocora; Burke, 1930
- Species: T. candida

Binomial name
- Temnocora candida (C. H. Gilbert & Burke, 1912)

Synonyms
- Careproctus candidus Gilbert & Burke, 1912

= Temnocora =

Species of fish

Temnocora is a monospecific genus of marine ray-finned fish belonging to the family Liparidae, the snailfishes. Its only species is Temnocora candida, the bigeye snailfish, which is found in the far northern Pacific Ocean where it is found at depths of from 64 to 400 metres (210 to 1,312 ft). This species grows to a length of 10.6 centimetres (4.2 in) SL. This species is the only known member of its genus. The bigeye snailfish is usually found around sand, pebbles, and rocky bottoms. It is also harmless to humans.
