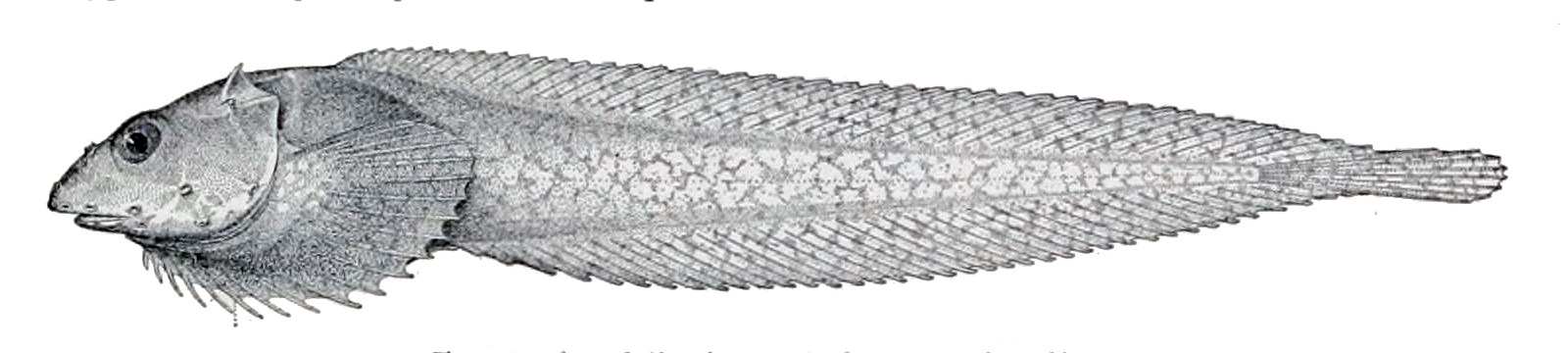
- Spiny snailfish (A. opercularis)

Scientific classification
- Kingdom: Animalia
- Phylum: Chordata
- Class: Actinopterygii
- Order: Perciformes
- Suborder: Cottoidei
- Family: Liparidae
- Genus: Acantholiparis; C. H. Gilbert & Burke, 1912

Type species
- Acantholiparis opercularis Gilbert & Burke, 1912

= Acantholiparis =

Genus of fishes

Acantholiparis is a genus of marine ray-finned fishes belongong to the family Liparidae, the snailfishes. These fishes are found in the northern Pacific Ocean.

== Species ==
Acantholiparis currently contains two recognized species:

- Acantholiparis caecus Grinols, 1969 (blind snailfish)
- Acantholiparis opercularis C. H. Gilbert & Burke, 1912 (spiny snailfish)
