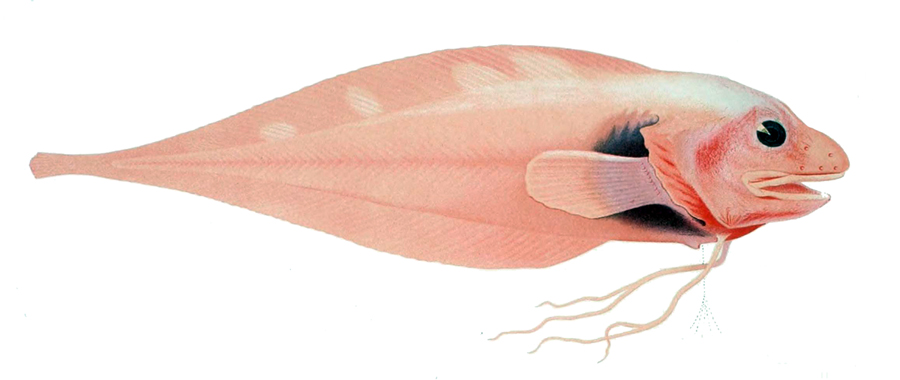

Scientific classification
- Domain: Eukaryota
- Kingdom: Animalia
- Phylum: Chordata
- Class: Actinopterygii
- Order: Perciformes
- Suborder: Cottoidei
- Family: Liparidae
- Genus: Rhodichthys
- Species: R. regina

Binomial name
- Rhodichthys regina Collett, 1879

= Threadfin seasnail =

Genus of fishes

The threadfin seasnail (Rhodichthys regina) is a species of snailfish native to the Arctic Ocean and the northeastern Atlantic Ocean, and may also be found in the North Pacific. It has been found at depths of from 1,080 to 2,365 metres (3,543 to 7,759 ft). This species grows to a length of 31 centimetres (12 in) SL.

== Description ==
It has no commercial value.
