= Eutelichthys =

Conservation status
- Data Deficient (IUCN 3.1)

Scientific classification
- Kingdom: Animalia
- Phylum: Chordata
- Class: Actinopterygii
- Order: Perciformes
- Suborder: Cottoidei
- Family: Liparidae
- Genus: Eutelichthys; Tortonese, 1959
- Species: E. leptochirus

Binomial name
- Eutelichthys leptochirus Tortonese, 1959

Species of fish

Eutelichthys is a monospecific genus of marine ray-finned fish belonging to the family Liparidae, It only species Eutelichthys leptochirus is found in the western Mediterranean Sea where it occurs at depths of from 500 to 700 metres (1,600 to 2,300 ft). This species grows to a length of 5.1 centimetres (2.0 in) SL. This species is the only known member of its genus.
