= Eknomoliparis =

Scientific classification
- Kingdom: Animalia
- Phylum: Chordata
- Class: Actinopterygii
- Order: Perciformes
- Suborder: Cottoidei
- Family: Liparidae
- Genus: Eknomoliparis; Stein, Meléndez C. & Kong U., 1991
- Species: E. chirichignoae

Binomial name
- Eknomoliparis chirichignoae Stein, Meléndez C. & Kong U., 1991

Species of fish

Eknomoliparis is a monospecific genus of marine ray-finned fish belonging to the family Liparidae. It only species Eknomoliparis chirichignoae is found in the southeastern Pacific Ocean off the coast of Chile where it occurs at depths of from 730 to 920 metres (2,400 to 3,020 ft). This species is the only known member of its genus.
