= Genioliparis =

Scientific classification
- Kingdom: Animalia
- Phylum: Chordata
- Class: Actinopterygii
- Order: Perciformes
- Suborder: Cottoidei
- Family: Liparidae
- Genus: Genioliparis; Andriashev & Neyelov, 1976

Type species
- Genioliparis lindbergi Andriashev & Neelov, 1976

Synonyms
- Odontoliparis Stein, 1978

Genus of fishes

Genioliparis is a genus of marine ray-finned fishes belonging to the family Liparidae, the snailfishes. These fishes are found in the Pacific and Southern Oceans.

== Taxonomy ==
Genioliparis was first proposed as a monospecific genus in 1976 by the Soviet ichthyologists Anatoly Petrovich Andriyashev and Alexei Vladimovich Neyelov when they described Genioliparis lindbergi as a new species from the South Shetland Islands. In 1978 David L. Stein described Odontoliparis ferox from the northeastern Pacific Ocean and this species was noted to be similar to G. lindbergi, when another new species, G. kafanovi, was described in 2008 by Arkadii Vladimirovich Balushkin and Olga Stepanovna Voskoboinikova and it was noted that O. ferox was similar to Genioliparis and that it should be included in that genus.

== Species ==
There are currently three recognized species in this genus:

- Genioliparis ferox (Stein, 1978)
- Genioliparis kafanovi Balushkin & Voskoboinikova, 2008
- Genioliparis lindbergi Andriashev & Neyelov, 1976
