= Praematoliparis =

Scientific classification
- Kingdom: Animalia
- Phylum: Chordata
- Class: Actinopterygii
- Order: Perciformes
- Suborder: Cottoidei
- Family: Liparidae
- Genus: Praematoliparis; Andriashev, 2003
- Species: P. anarthractae

Binomial name
- Praematoliparis anarthractae (Stein & Tompkins, 1989)

Genus of fishes

Praematoliparis is a monospecific genus of marine ray-finned fish belonging to the family Liparidae, the snailfishes. It only species is Praematoliparis anarthractae which is found in the southeastern Pacific Ocean near Chile where it can be found at depths down to 485 metres (1,591 ft) though usually not deeper than 55 metres (180 ft).
