= Rhinoliparis =

Scientific classification
- Domain: Eukaryota
- Kingdom: Animalia
- Phylum: Chordata
- Class: Actinopterygii
- Order: Perciformes
- Suborder: Cottoidei
- Family: Liparidae
- Genus: Rhinoliparis; C. H. Gilbert, 1896

Type species
- Rhinoliparis barbulifer C. H. Gilbert, 1896

Genus of fishes

Rhinoliparis is a genus of snailfishes native to the northern Pacific Ocean.

== Species ==
There are currently two recognized species in this genus:

- Rhinoliparis attenuatus Burke, 1912 (Slim snailfish)
- Rhinoliparis barbulifer C. H. Gilbert, 1896 (Longnose snailfish)
