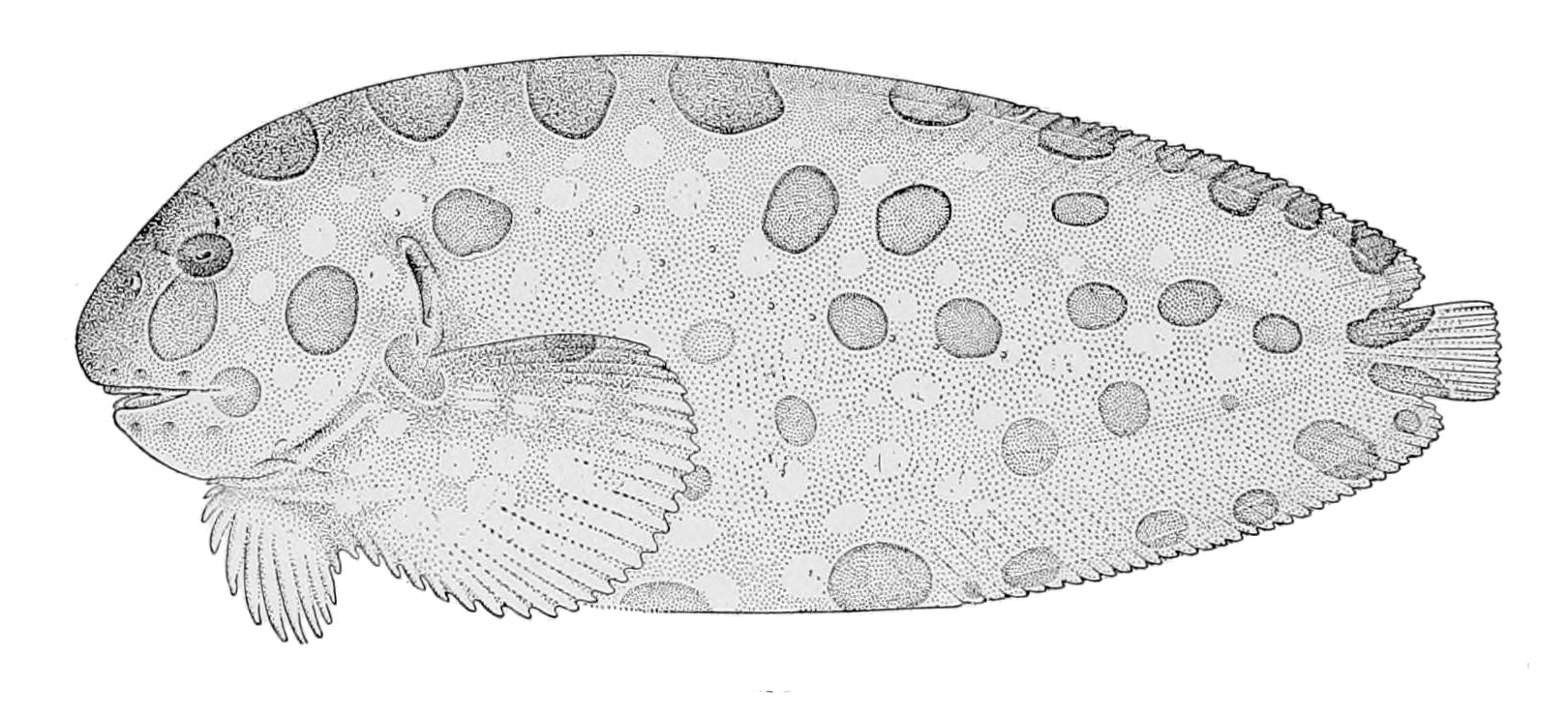
- Crystallichthys cyclospilus

Scientific classification
- Kingdom: Animalia
- Phylum: Chordata
- Class: Actinopterygii
- Order: Perciformes
- Suborder: Cottoidei
- Family: Liparidae
- Genus: Crystallichthys
- Species: C. cyclospilus

Binomial name
- Crystallichthys cyclospilus Gilbert & Burke, 1912

= Crystallichthys cyclospilus =

Species of snailfish

Crystallichthys cyclospilus, the blotched snailfish, is a species of snailfish.
