= Notoliparis =

Scientific classification
- Kingdom: Animalia
- Phylum: Chordata
- Class: Actinopterygii
- Order: Perciformes
- Suborder: Cottoidei
- Family: Liparidae
- Genus: Notoliparis; Andriashev, 1975

Type species
- Notoliparis kurchatovi Andriashev, 1975

Genus of fishes

Notoliparis is a genus of marine ray-finned fish belonging to the family Liparidae, the snailfishes. These fishes are found in deep Oceanic trenches in the South Atlantic South Pacific and Southern Oceans.

== Taxonomy ==
Notoliparis was first proposed as a genus in 1975 by the Soviet ichthyologist Anatoly Petrovich Andriyashev when he described Notoliparis kurchatovi from off the South Orkney Islands which he also designated as the type species of the new genus. The genus is classified within the family Liparidae.

== Etymology ==
Notoliparis prefixes the type genus of the family Liparidae with notos which means "south", referring to the distribution of the species belonging to this genus in the Southern Hemisphere.

== Species ==
There are currently 5 recognized species in this genus:

- Notoliparis antonbruuni Stein, 2005 (Anton Bruun's snailfish)
- Notoliparis kermadecensis (J. G. Nielsen, 1964) (Kermadec snailfish)
- Notoliparis kurchatovi Andriashev, 1975 (Kurchatov's snailfish)
- Notoliparis macquariensis Andriashev, 1978 (Macquarie snailfish)
- Notoliparis stewarti Stein, 2016 (Stewart's snailfish)

== Characteristics ==
Notoliparis snailfishes are characterised by the possession of an unpaired coronal pore in the sensory canal of the head, paired postcoronal pores and 4 pairs of pores in the temporal region. There is a single pair of nostrils and the small teeth are simple. They also have very small eyes. The gill openings sit wholly above the pectoral fins which have unincised fin rays. The pectoral fins are modifies to create a sucker. The single unique feature of this genus within the Liparidae is the existence of small canals, called canalculi, behind each cephalic pore.

== Distribution and habitat ==
Notoliparis snailfishes are hadal, being found in deep oceanic trenches with each known species being found in different trenches, N. antonbrunni is only known from off Peru, N. kermadecensis and N. stewarti from the Kermadec Trench, N. macquariensis from the Macquarie-Hjort Trench, south of the Macquarie Plateau and N. kurchatovi from the South Orkney Trench in the Scotia Sea.
