= Anatoly Yakovlevich Taranetz =

Soviet ichthyologist and WWII veteran (1910–1941)

- Anatoly Yakovlevich Taranetz's signature
- Born: 3 July 1910
- Died: December 10, 1941 (aged 31)
- Citizenship: Soviet Union / Russia
- Education: Vladivostok Industrial College (now Vladivostok Shipbuilding College)
- Scientific career
- Fields: Ichthyology
- Workplaces: Russian Academy of Sciences

Anatoly Yakovlevich Taranetz (3 July 1910 – 10 December 1941) was a Soviet Russian ichthyologist, notable for his contribution to the study of ichthyofauna of the North Pacific and Far Eastern seas of Russia.

== Notable dates ==
- Spring 1929 - Graduated from the Vladivostok Industrial College (now Vladivostok Shipbuilding College) and became
- Spring 1929 - Observer in the raw materials sector of the Pacific Fisheries Research Center (TINRO-Center, part of the Far Eastern Branch of the Russian Academy of Sciences)
- 1932 – Marine Researcher, TIRH Complex Pacific Expedition of the State Hydrological Institute and the Pacific Committee of the Russian Academy of Sciences
- 1933 – Started work at the Leningrad Zoological Institute
- 1934 – Defended his thesis on "Freshwater fish of the North-Western basin in the Sea of Japan"
- 1934 – Participated in the expedition to Sahalin
- 1939 – Leader of a group for the study of salmon
- Beginning of 1941 – Editor of the Guide to the fishing industry of the Far East
- November 10, 1941 – Drafted into the army
- December 1941 – His echelon is destroyed by enemy aircraft

== Biography ==
Taranetz conducted his later research (1938–1941) on the Amur River, paying special attention to the methodology of studying the yield of any one generation of salmon and its dependence upon hydrological and other factors.

Taranetz produced about 30 published works, including a series of articles on the ichthyofauna of Amur River, and over 20 manuscripts devoted to both individual species and genera of fish, and ichthyofauna of various areas of the Far East.

== Selected publications ==
- Taranetz, A.Y. (1937). Guide to the Fishes of the Soviet Far East and Adjacent Waters (or Handbook for Identification of Fishes of Soviet Far East and Adjacent Waters). Vol. 11. Proc. Pacific Inst. Fish. (Pacific Scientific Institute of Fisheries and Oceanography). p. 200.

== List of taxa named in honour of A.Y. Taranetz ==
=== Chordata ===
- Arhynchobatidae: Rhinoraja taranetzi (Dolganov, 1983)
- Salmonidae: Salvelinus taranetzi (Kaganowsky, 1955)
- Zoarcidae: Taranetzella lyoderma (Andriashev, 1952)
- Cottidae: Radulinopsis taranetzi (Yabe & Maruyama, 2001)

=== Fish ===
- Bathylutichthys taranetzi Balushkin & Voskoboinikova 1990
- Gymnogobius taranetzi (Pinchuk 1978)
- Radulinopsis taranetzi Yabe & Maruyama 2001
- Bathyraja taranetzi (Dolganov 1983)
- Salvelinus taranetzi Kaganowsky 1955

== Taxon described by him ==
- Category:Taxa named by Anatoly Yakovlevich Taranetz
