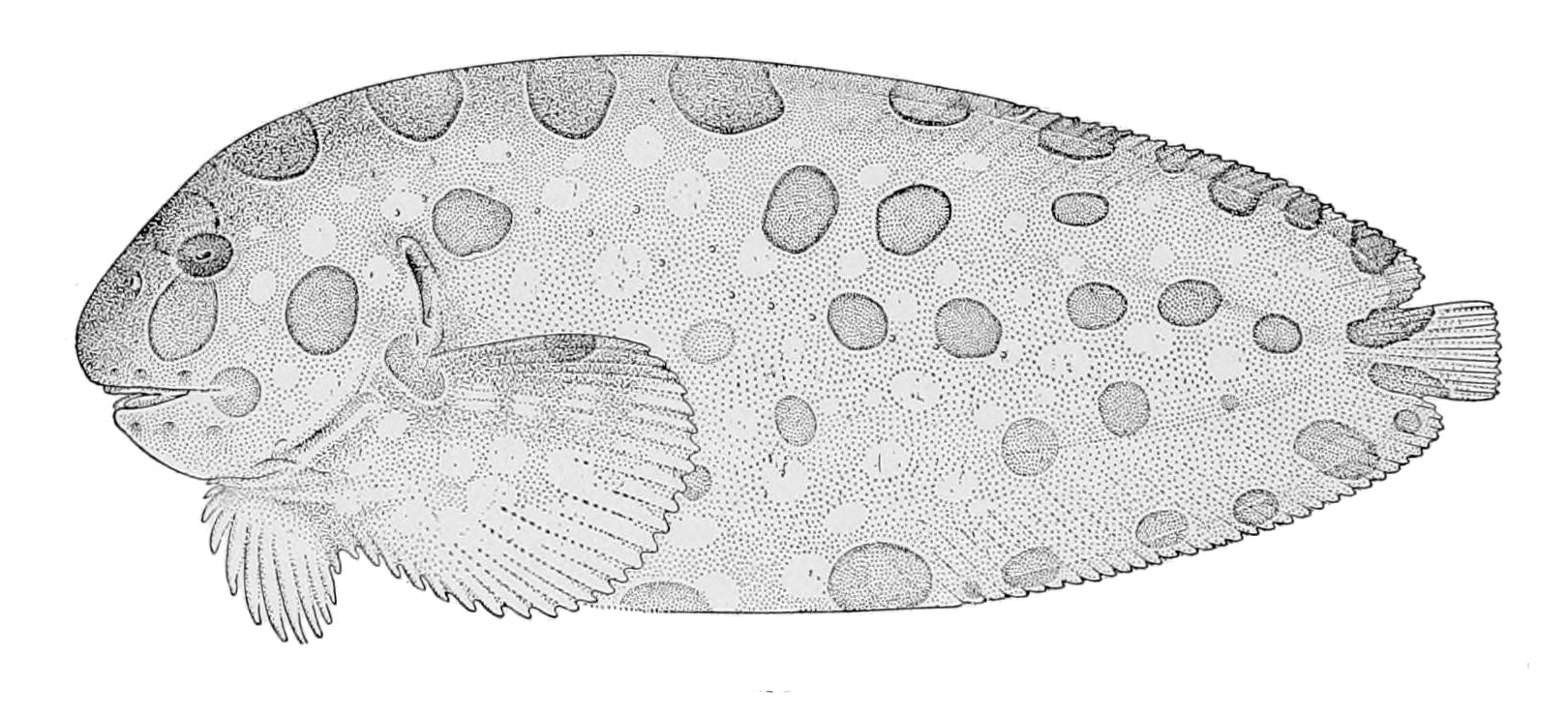
- Crystallichthys cyclospilus

Scientific classification
- Kingdom: Animalia
- Phylum: Chordata
- Class: Actinopterygii
- Order: Perciformes
- Suborder: Cottoidei
- Family: Liparidae
- Genus: Crystallichthys; Jordan & Gilbert, 1898

Type species
- Crystallichthys mirabilis Jordan & Gilbert, 1898

= Crystallichthys =

Genus of fishes

Crystallichthys is a genus of marine ray-finned fishes belonging to the family Liparidae, the snailfishes. These fishes are found in the northern Pacific Ocean.

== Species ==
There are currently 3 recognized species in this genus:

- Crystallichthys cameliae (Nalbant, 1965)
- Crystallichthys cyclospilus Gilbert & Burke, 1912 (Blotched snailfish)
- Crystallichthys mirabilis Jordan & Gilbert, 1898
