= Bathylutichthys =

Scientific classification
- Kingdom: Animalia
- Phylum: Chordata
- Class: Actinopterygii
- Order: Perciformes
- Suborder: Cottoidei
- Family: Psychrolutidae
- Genus: Bathylutichthys; Balushkin & Voskoboinikova, 1990

Type species
- Bathylutichthys taranetzi Balushkin & Voskoboinikova, 1990

Genus of fishes

Bathylutichthys, the Antarctic sculpins, is a genus of marine ray-finned fishes in the family Psychrolutidae. These fishes are found in the Southern Ocean.

== Taxonomy ==
Bathylutichthys was first proposed as a monospecific genus in 1990 by the Russian ichthyologists Arkadii Vladimirovich Balushkin and Olga Stepanovna Voskoboinikova when they described Bathylutichthys taranetzi from off South Georgia. A second species, Bathylutichthys balushkini was described by Voskoboinikova from the Meteor Shoal in the southeastern Atlantic. The 5th edition of Fishes of the World classified the genus in the monotypic family Bathylutichthyidae, but other authorities place the genus in the subfamily Psychrolutinae in the family Psychrolutidae. Phylogenetically the taxon has been argued to be intermediate between the Psychrolutidae and the two families making up the superfamily Cyclopteroidea, meaning that those two families would not be supported as a superfamily within the Cottoidei. Presently, Eschmeyer's Catalog of Fishes places it in the Psychrolutidae.

== Species ==
There are currently 2 recognized species in this genus:

- Bathylutichthys balushkini Voskoboinikova, 2014
- Bathylutichthys taranetzi Balushkin & Voskoboinikova, 1990

== Characteristics ==
Bathylutichthys sculpins have naked, scaleless bodies. The space between the eyes is broad. There is a pair of long barbels on the lower jaw at the corner of the mouth> They have one dorsal fin with the anterior part embedded under the skin. This fin has with 13 spines and 28 soft rays while the anal fin is supported by 36 soft rays. The pelvic fin contains 3 soft rays. All the soft rays in the fins are simple. There are no teeth on the roof of the mouth.
