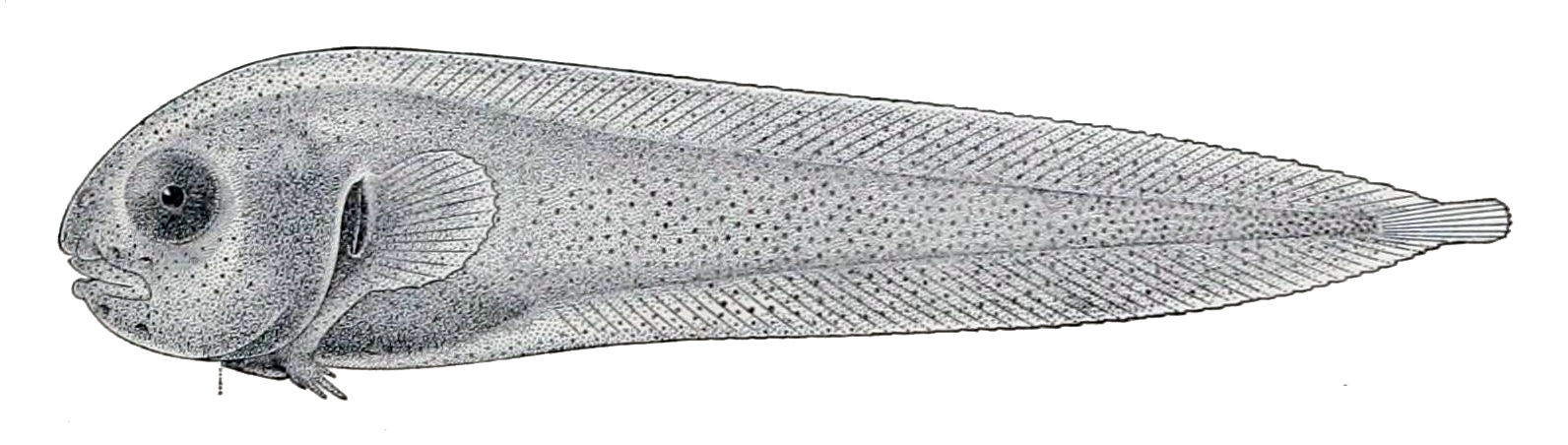

Scientific classification
- Kingdom: Animalia
- Phylum: Chordata
- Class: Actinopterygii
- Order: Perciformes
- Suborder: Cottoidei
- Family: Liparidae
- Genus: Nectoliparis; C. H. Gilbert & Burke, 1912
- Species: N. pelagicus

Binomial name
- Nectoliparis pelagicus C. H. Gilbert & Burke, 1912

= Tadpole snailfish =

Species of fish

The tadpole snailfish (Nectoliparis pelagicus) is a species of snailfish native to the north Pacific Ocean where it can be found at depths down to 3,383 metres (11,100 ft) (though more commonly down to 238 metres (780 ft)). This species grows to a length of 6.5 centimetres (2.6 in) SL. This species is the only known member of the monospecific genus Nectoliparis.
