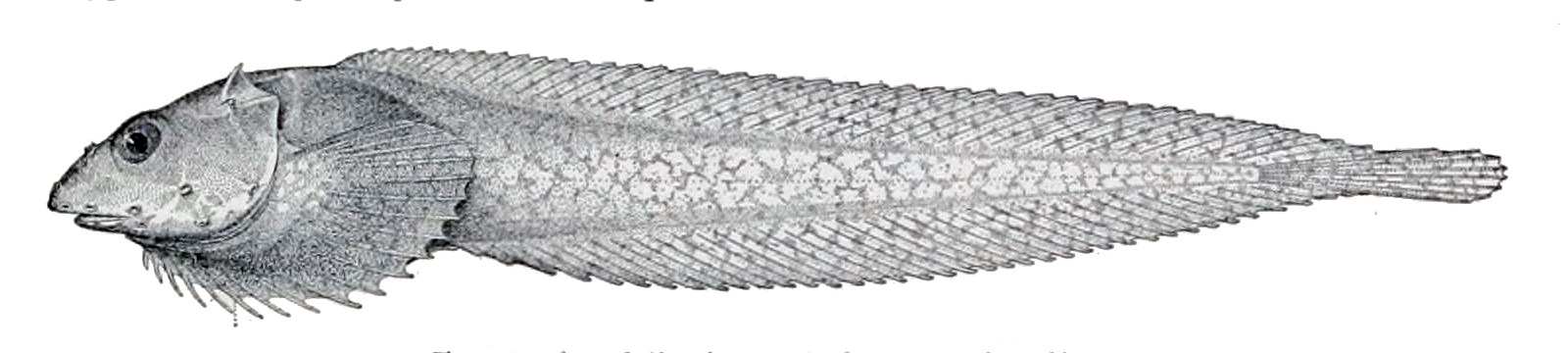

Scientific classification
- Kingdom: Animalia
- Phylum: Chordata
- Class: Actinopterygii
- Order: Perciformes
- Suborder: Cottoidei
- Family: Liparidae
- Genus: Acantholiparis
- Species: A. opercularis

Binomial name
- Acantholiparis opercularis C. H. Gilbert & Burke, 1912

= Acantholiparis opercularis =

Species of fish

Acantholiparis opercularis, or the spiny snailfish, is one of two species within the snailfish genus Acantholiparis. The generic name comes from the Greek akantha meaning "thorn" and liparis meaning "fat". The specific name comes from the Latin opercularis, meaning covered (as in a lid).

== Size ==
Acantholiparis opercularis is a small fish, with a length up to 7 cm.

== Habitat ==
Acantholiparis opercularis is a deep-water fish, known from depths between 227 m and 3600 m. It is a demersal fish, living just above the seabed.

== Range ==
Acantholiparis opercularis lives generally near the coast, over a wide range stretching as a crescent from Kamchatka to Alaska and as far south as the coast of Oregon.
