= Psednos =

Scientific classification
- Kingdom: Animalia
- Phylum: Chordata
- Class: Actinopterygii
- Order: Perciformes
- Suborder: Cottoidei
- Family: Liparidae
- Genus: Psednos; Barnard, 1927

Type species
- Psednos micrurus Barnard, 1927

Synonyms
- Protopsednos Andriashev, 2003

Genus of fishes

Psednos is a genus of snailfishes found in all the world's oceans.

== Species ==
There are currently 35 recognized species in this genus:

- Psednos andriashevi Chernova, 2001 (Andriashev's dwarf snailfish)
- Psednos anoderkes Chernova & Stein, 2002
- Psednos argyrogaster Stein, 2012
- Psednos balushkini Stein, Chernova & Andriashev, 2001 (Palemouth snailfish)
- Psednos barnardi Chernova, 2001 (Blackchin dwarf snailfish)
- Psednos carolinae Stein, 2005
- Psednos cathetostomus Chernova & Stein, 2002
- Psednos chathami Stein, 2012
- Psednos christinae Andriashev, 1992 (European dwarf snailfish)
- Psednos cryptocaeca Stein, 2012
- Psednos delawarei Chernova & Stein, 2002
- Psednos dentatus Chernova & Stein, 2002
- Psednos gelatinosus Chernova, 2001 (Gelatinous dwarf snailfish)
- Psednos griseus Chernova & Stein, 2002
- Psednos groenlandicus Chernova, 2001 (Greenland dwarf snailfish)
- Psednos gulliensis Chernova & Lujan, 2025
- Psednos harteli Chernova, 2001 (Hartel's dwarf snailfish)
- Psednos islandicus Chernova & Stein, 2002
- Psednos longiventris Stein, 2012
- Psednos melanocephalus Chernova & Stein, 2002
- Psednos mexicanus Chernova & Stein, 2002
- Psednos microps Chernova, 2001 (Smalleye dwarf snailfish)
- Psednos microstomus Stein, 2012
- Psednos micruroides Chernova, 2001 (Multipore dwarf snailfish)
- Psednos micrurus Barnard, 1927 (Barnard's dwarf snailfish)
- Psednos mirabilis Chernova, 2001 (Marvelous dwarf snailfish)
- Psednos nataliae Stein & Andriyashev, 2001 (Darkgill snailfish)
- Psednos nemnezi Stein, 2012§
- Psednos pallidus Chernova & Stein, 2002
- Psednos platyoperculosus Stein, 2012
- Psednos sargassicus Chernova, 2001 (Sargasso dwarf snailfish)
- Psednos spirohira Chernova & Stein, 2002
- Psednos steini Chernova, 2001 (Stein's dwarf snailfish)
- Psednos struthersi Stein, 2012
- Psednos whitleyi Stein, Chernova & Andriashev, 2001 (Bigcheek snailfish)
