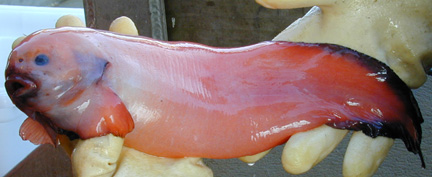
- Snailfish (probably Elassodiscus tremebundus) caught in the eastern Bering Sea

Scientific classification
- Kingdom: Animalia
- Phylum: Chordata
- Class: Actinopterygii
- Order: Perciformes
- Suborder: Cottoidei
- Superfamily: Cyclopteroidea
- Family: Liparidae; T. N. Gill, 1861

Type genus
- Liparis Scopoli, 1777

= Snailfish =

Family of fishes

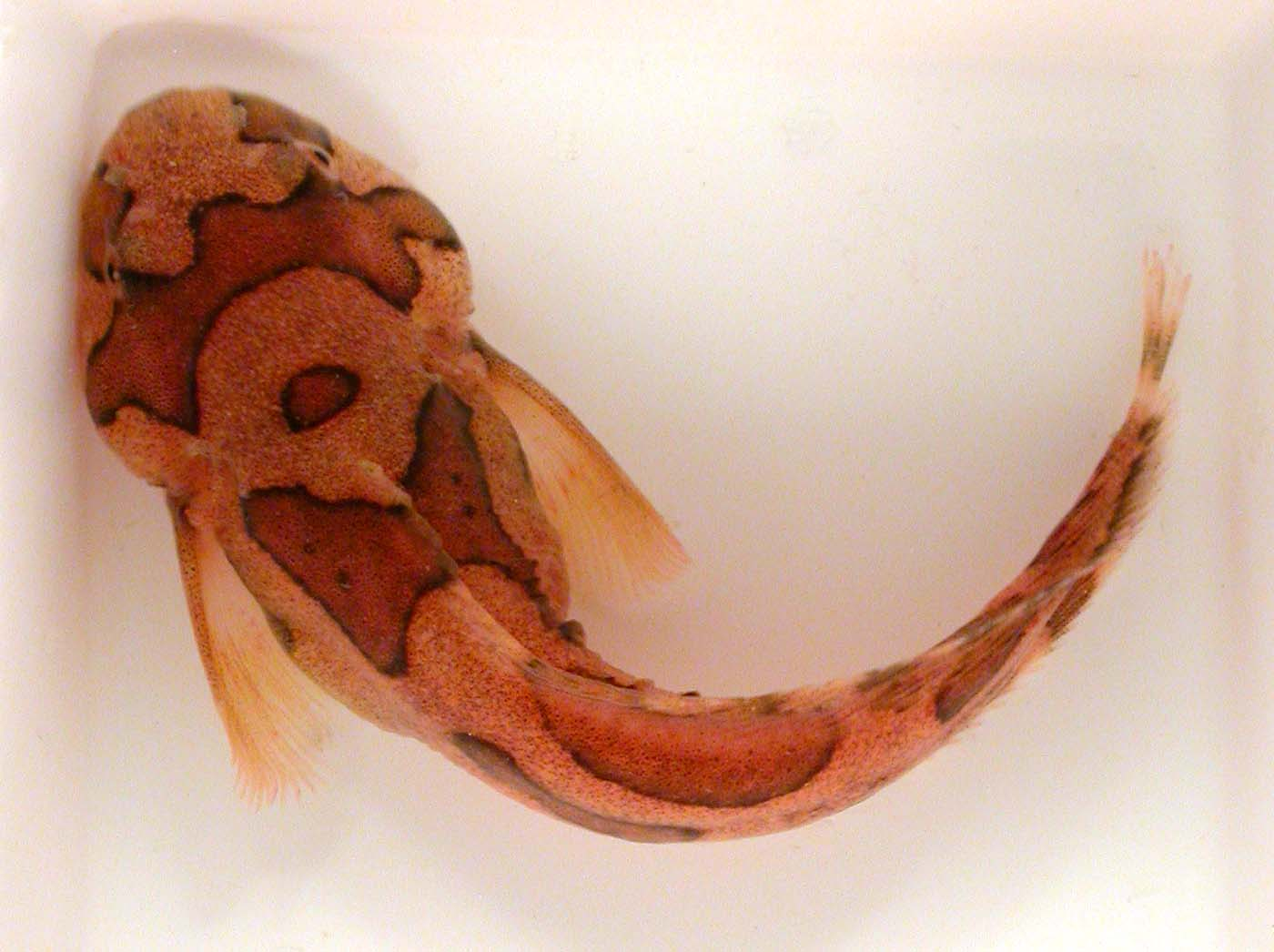
Liparis marmoratus

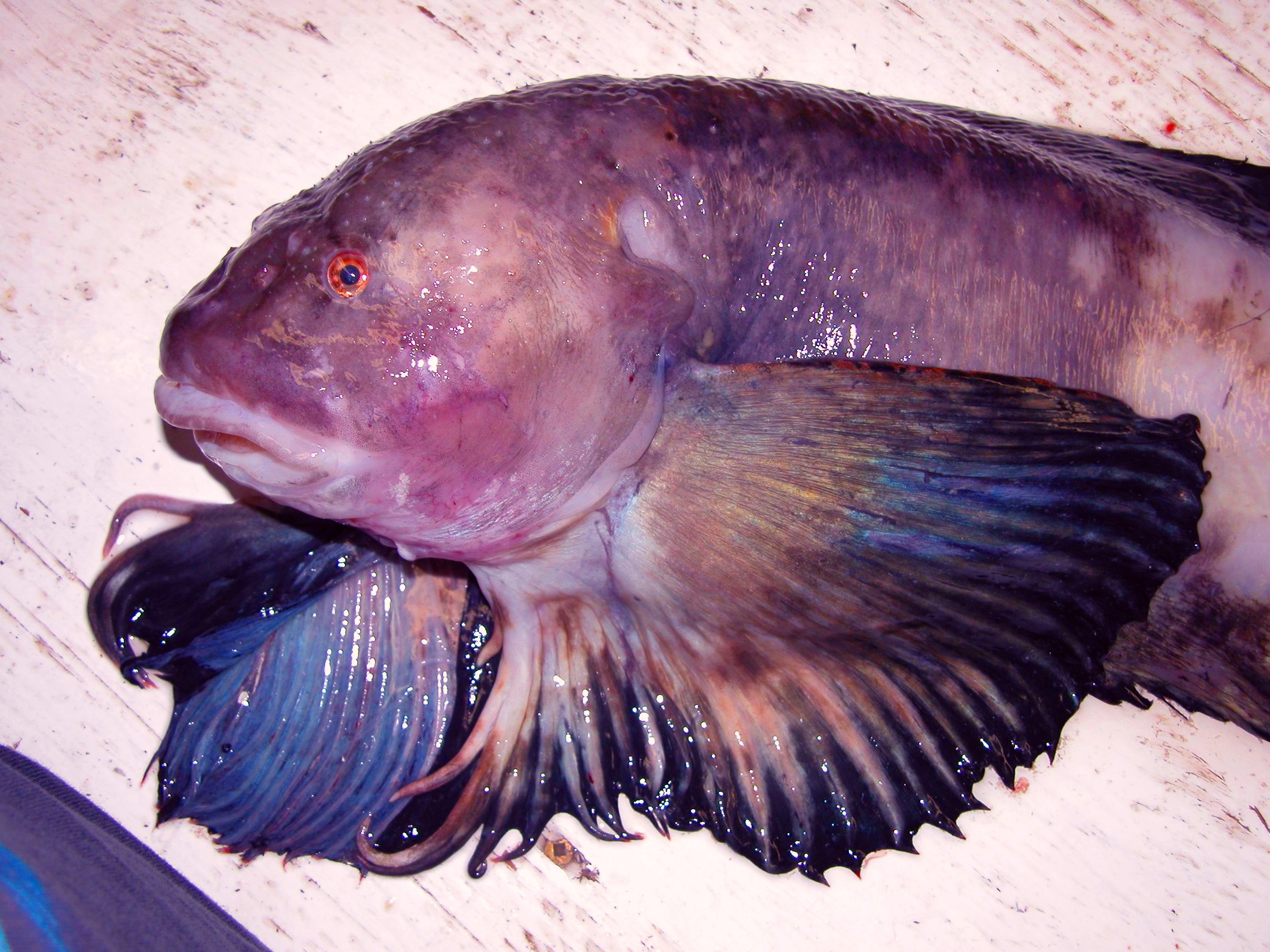
Liparis catharus

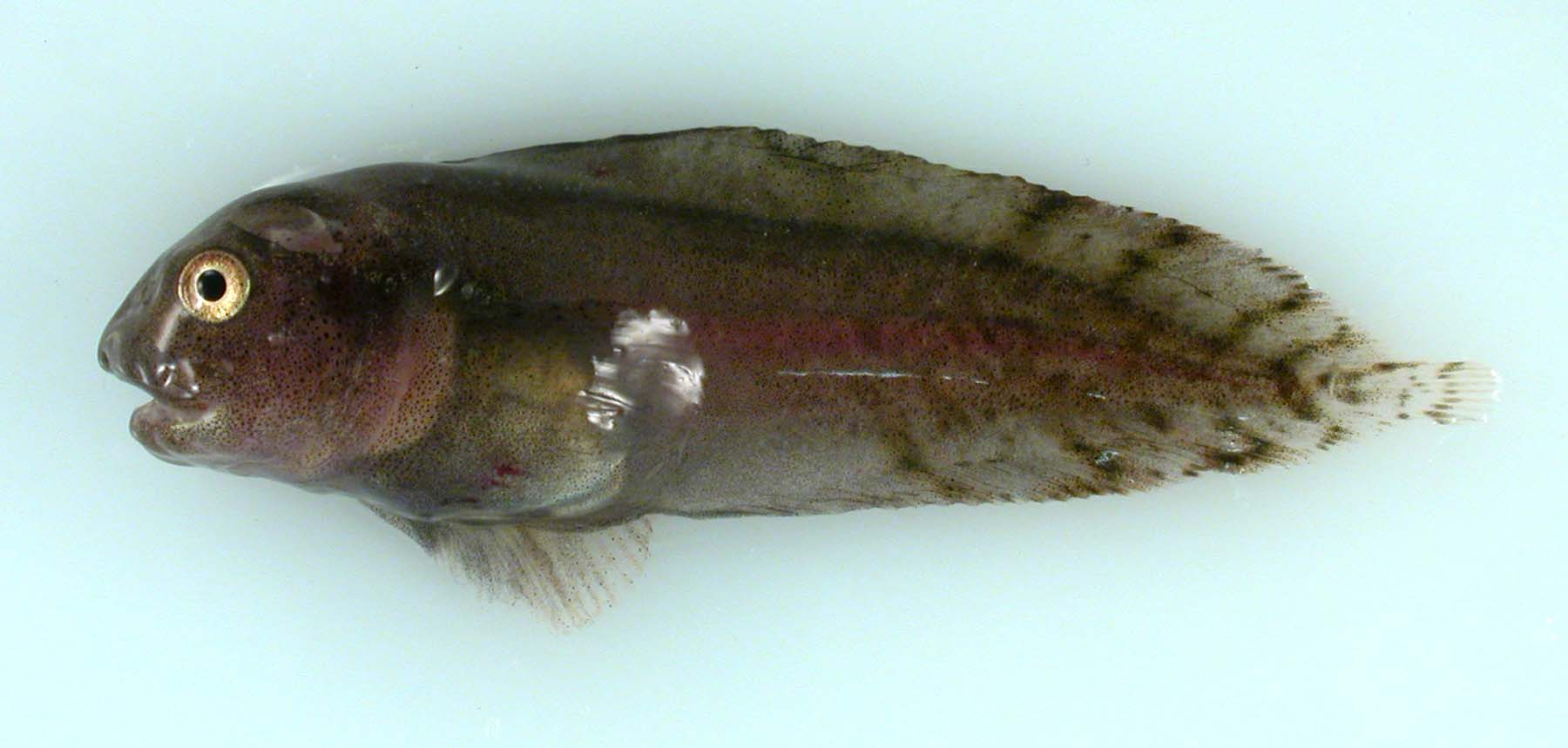
Liparis fabricii

The snailfishes or sea snails, are a family of marine ray-finned fishes. These fishes make up the Liparidae, a family classified within the order Scorpaeniformes.

Widely distributed from the Arctic to Antarctic Oceans, including the oceans in between, the snailfish family contains more than 30 genera and about 410 described species, but there are also many undescribed species. Snailfish are found at depths ranging from shallow coastal waters to more than 8,300 m (27,200 ft), including in seven ocean trenches.

== Taxonomy ==
The snailfish family, Liparidae, was first proposed by the American biologist Theodore Gill in 1861. The 5th edition of Fishes of the World classifies this family within superfamily Cyclopteroidea, part of the suborder Cottoidei of the order Scorpaeniformes. Other authorities do not recognise this superfamily and classify the two families within it, Cyclopteridae and Liparidae, within the infraorder Cottales alongside the sculpins, within the order Perciformes. An osteological analysis found that the genus Bathylutichthys was intermediate between the Psychrolutidae and the two families making up the Cyclopteroidea, meaning that those two families would not be supported as a superfamily within the Cottoidei.

== Molecular biology ==
Species of deep-sea snailfish have been studied and compared to other ray-finned fishes (also known as teleosts) to analyze their adaptions to deep-sea conditions. The genomes of both the Yap hadal snailfish and Mariana hadal snailfish have been found to contain an abundance of the fmo3 gene, which produces the trimethylamine N-oxide (TMAO) protein stabilizer. Analysis of Yap hadal snailfish reveals a loss of olfactory receptors and gain of taste receptors, possibly due to the fairly restricted availability of food in the deep-sea. Additionally, perhaps due to lack of light in the deep sea, the Yap genome includes fewer copies of crystallin genes, which encode proteins that sense light and assist in focused vision, in comparison to other teleosts. Meanwhile, Mariana hadal snailfish have lost several photoreceptor genes, decreasing their vision capabilities (especially in terms of color), and have completely lost the mc1r pigmentation gene, rendering them colorless. Mariana hadal snailfish also have adjusted to pressure due to a mutation in bglap which prevents cartilage calcification, revealed in their skulls. Further, their genome includes increased amounts of genes encoding enzymes for beta oxidation and transport proteins, thereby increasing membrane fluidity.

== Description ==
Snailfish have an elongated, tadpole-like shape. Their heads are large in comparison to their body and they have small eyes. Their bodies are slender but deep and they taper to very small tails. The extensive dorsal and anal fins may merge or nearly merge with the tail fin. Snailfish are scaleless with a thin, loose gelatinous skin which surrounds the spine and can vary in terms of size and shape between species. The gelatinous layer has a high water and low protein, lipid and carbohydrate content, therefore it can provide growth with low metabolic cost. This may aid species in avoiding predation and conserving energy, especially for deep sea snailfish who live in low energy conditions. Some species, such as Acantholiparis opercularis, have prickly spines as well. Their teeth are small and simple with blunt cusps. The deep-sea species have prominent, well-developed sensory pores on the head, part of the animals' lateral line system.

The pectoral fins are large and provide the snailfish with its primary means of locomotion, although they are fragile. In some species such as the antarctic Paraliparis devriesi, the pectoral fins have an expanded somatosensory system, including a taste bud. The snailfish are benthic fish with pelvic fins modified to form an adhesive disc; this nearly circular disc is absent in Paraliparis and Nectoliparis species. Research has revealed that maximum depth of living can be a significant predictor for loss of the pelvic disk in certain species of snailfish. Based on phylogenetic analysis, this ancestral feature has been lost three separate times in Snailfish.

Snailfish range in size from Paraliparis australis at 5 cm (2.0 in) to Polypera simushirae at some 77 cm (30 in) in length. The latter species may reach a weight of 21 kg (46 lb), but most species are smaller. Snailfish are of no interest to commercial fisheries.

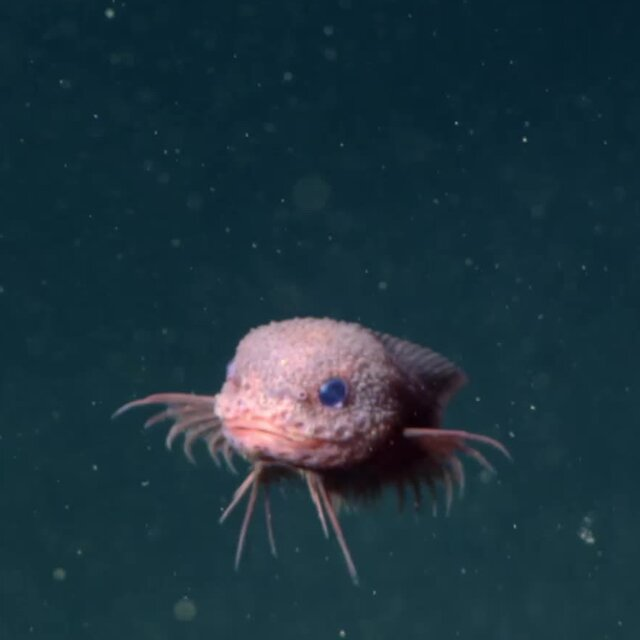
Careproctus colliculi

The deepest snailfish do not explode when brought to the surface, because they do not have a swim bladder. However, they do not survive capture, possibly due to molecular effects of depressurization. Many intact specimens have been retrieved in recent years for biochemical and anatomical study. Buoyancy without a swimbladder is due to gelatinous tissue and low-calcium bones.

== Occurrence and habitat ==
Snailfish habitats vary widely. They are found in oceans worldwide, ranging from shallow intertidal zones to depths of more than 8,300 m (27,200 ft) in the hadal zone. This is a wider depth range than any other family of fish. They are strictly found in cold waters, meaning that species of tropical and subtropical regions strictly are deepwater. They are common in most cold marine waters and are highly resilient, with some species, such as Liparis atlanticus and Liparus gibbus, having type-1 antifreeze proteins. It is the most species-rich family of fish in the Antarctic region, generally found in relatively deep waters (shallower Antarctic waters are dominated by Antarctic icefish).

The diminutive inquiline snailfish (Liparis inquilinus) of the northwestern Atlantic is known to live out its life inside the mantle cavity of the scallop Placopecten magellanicus. Liparis tunicatus lives amongst the kelp forests of the Bering Strait and the Gulf of St. Lawrence. The single species in genus Rhodichthys is endemic to the Norwegian Sea. Other species are found on muddy or silty bottoms of continental slopes.

=== Depth record ===
Although most snailfish live no deeper than the bathyal zone (less than 4,000 m [13,000 ft] deep), some live at greater depths than any other fish. In 2008, a UK-Japan team discovered a shoal of Pseudoliparis amblystomopsis snailfish at a depth of 7,700 m (25,300 ft) in the Japan Trench. These were, at the time, the deepest living fish ever recorded on film. The record was surpassed by snailfish filmed in the Mariana Trench at depths of 8,145 m (26,722 ft) in 2014 and 8,178 m (26,831 ft) in 2017, and at 8,336 m (27,349 ft) in the Izu–Ogasawara Trench in 2023. The species in these deepest records are unknown and may be undescribed, but have been referred to as "ethereal snailfish". The deepest-living described species is Pseudoliparis swirei, of the Mariana Trench, recorded at 8,076 m (26,496 ft).

Snailfish (notably genera Notoliparis and Pseudoliparis) are the most common and dominant fish family in the hadal zone. Pseudoliparis swirei possesses multiple molecular adaptations to the intense pressures of a deep sea environment, including highest-known contents of TMAO, pressure-tolerant cartilage, pressure-stable proteins, increased transport protein activity, higher cell membrane fluidity, and loss of eyesight and other visual characteristics such as color, as shown by genomic analysis. Because of biochemical restrictions, 8,000–8,500 m (26,200–27,900 ft) is likely the maximum depth possible for any vertebrate. The larvae of some hadal snailfish species may spend time in open water at relatively shallow depths, less than 1,000 m (3,300 ft).

== Reproduction and life span ==
Reproductive strategies vary extensively among snailfish species, though it is thought that many abyssal benthic snailfish spawn seasonally and for relatively long intervals. It appears that all species lay relatively large eggs (diameter up to 9.4 mm [0.37 in]) and the number of eggs is species dependent. The larger size of eggs in hadal snailfish species indicates continuous spawning. Some species deposit their egg masses among cold-water corals, kelp, stones, or xenophyophores and males will sometimes guard the egg mass. At least one species, Careproctus ovigerus of the North Pacific, practices mouth brooding where the male snailfish carries the developing eggs around in his mouth. Some other species of the genus Careproctus, are parasitic, laying their eggs in the gill cavities of king crabs. The eggs put pressure on the crabs' gills which can cause the gill tissue to be damaged or die altogether. However, the survival of snailfish larvae has been shown to increase by the snailfish utilizing the crab host species as a way to care for and aerate their eggs. The eggs themselves are self-adhesive and tend to form masses that replicate the shape of the internal branchial chambers of crabs. Additionally, at least one species of snailfish that utilize the golden king crab as a host, Careproctus pallidus, has larvae with a lower energy content than normal for most marine fish. A possible explanation for starting life with less energy is due to the safety provided by the king crab, allowing the adult snailfish to not expend as much energy producing an energy-rich yolk sac. A different species, Careproctus rhodomelas, was found to be a batch spawner, laying multiple batches of large eggs multiple times throughout its lifetime.

After the eggs hatch, some species rapidly reach the adult size and only live for about one year, but others live for more than a decade. Otolith analysis (the investigation of snailfish ear bone) gives insight into longevity by seeing how it is broken into alternating translucent and opaque zones. This relays information about annual growth. By further examining the morphology of the deep-sea snailfish, it may be evident that these snailfish have adapted to their extreme environment by having a short life span compared to other organisms in the same hadal environment. Many species are located in hadal trenches, which are inherently high-disturbance areas, including lots of seismic activity which can trigger turbidity flows. Because of this, they live significantly shorter lifespans than shallower species.

Little is known about snailfish courtship behavior but males of Careproctus pallidus are believed to wiggle their bodies as attractive or aggressive display. It is thought that in an environment so dark, it is hard to find and win contests for a mate. Therefore, snailfish use hydrodynamic signals that are felt by the mechanosensory lateral line to communicate.

== Diet ==
Larval snailfish feed on a mix of plankton, small and large copepods, and amphipods. The larval diet of three Beaufort Sea snailfish species contained 28 food categories, mainly copepods and amphipods.

Snailfish prey fall into six main categories: gammarid, krill, natantian decapods, other crustaceans, fish, and others. Size also affects snailfish diets; snailfish smaller than 50 mm primarily eat gammarids, while species larger than 100 mm primarily eat natantian decapods. Species larger than 150 mm have the highest proportion of fish in their diet. The largest snailfish species tend to be piscivorous.

With the Okhotsk snailfish (Liparis ochotensis), the ratio between food intake and body weight changes as the organism grows; it is also highly seasonally variable. When the local environment experiences an increase in shrimp and crangonidae numbers, there is also a subsequent decrease in decapods. There are also snailfish localized to the Terpeniya Bay that purely eat zooplankton, setting them apart from other snailfish.

The snailfish that live in the northern hemisphere also display a higher starvation tolerance, which may be due to the triglycerol and cholesterol levels in this species. The snailfish have different lipid concentrations depending on their habitat, making some of them better-suited for longer periods without feeding than others.

The ambush hunting methods employed by the Simushir snailfish (Polypera simushirae) are unique among snailfish. They have the ability to blend into the ground, waiting to surprise the next organism to wander into their path. The top prey for this species are fish, making up 97.7% of their overall food intake.

== Genera ==
This family contains these genera as of 2020:

- Acantholiparis Gilbert & Burke, 1912
- Aetheliparis Stein, 2012
- Allocareproctus Pitruk & Fedorov, 1993
- Careproctus Krøyer, 1862
- Crystallias Jordan & Snyder, 1902
- Crystallichthys Jordan & Gilbert, 1898
- Eknomoliparis Stein, Meléndez C. & Kong U., 1991
- Elassodiscus Gilbert & Burke, 1912
- Eutelichthys Tortonese, 1959
- Genioliparis Andriashev & Neyelov, 1976
- Gyrinichthys Gilbert, 1896
- Liparis Scopoli, 1777
- Lipariscus Gilbert, 1915
- Lopholiparis Orr, 2004
- Menziesichthys Nalbant & Mayer, 1971
- Nectoliparis Gilbert & Burke, 1912
- Notoliparis Andriashev, 1975
- Osteodiscus Stein, 1978
- Palmoliparis Balushkin, 1996
- Paraliparis Collett, 1879
- Polypera Burke, 1912
- Praematoliparis Andriashev, 2003
- Prognatholiparis Orr & Busby, 2001
- Psednos Barnard, 1927
- Pseudoliparis Andriashev, 1955
- Pseudonotoliparis Pitruk, 1991
- Rhinoliparis Gilbert, 1896
- Rhodichthys Collett, 1879
- Squaloliparis Pitruk & Fedorov, 1993
- Temnocora Burke, 1930
- Volodichthys Balushkin, 2012
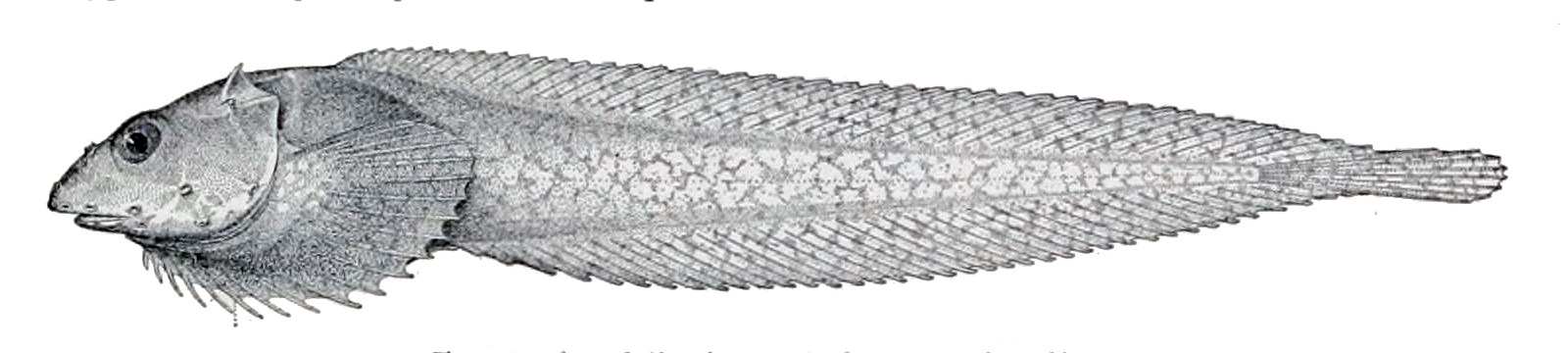
Acantholiparis opercularis

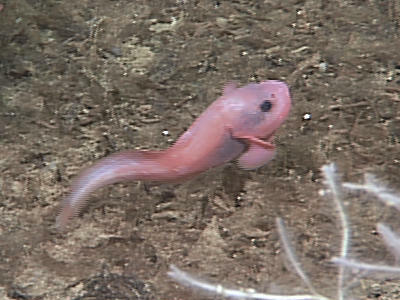
Careproctus ovigerus (juvenile)

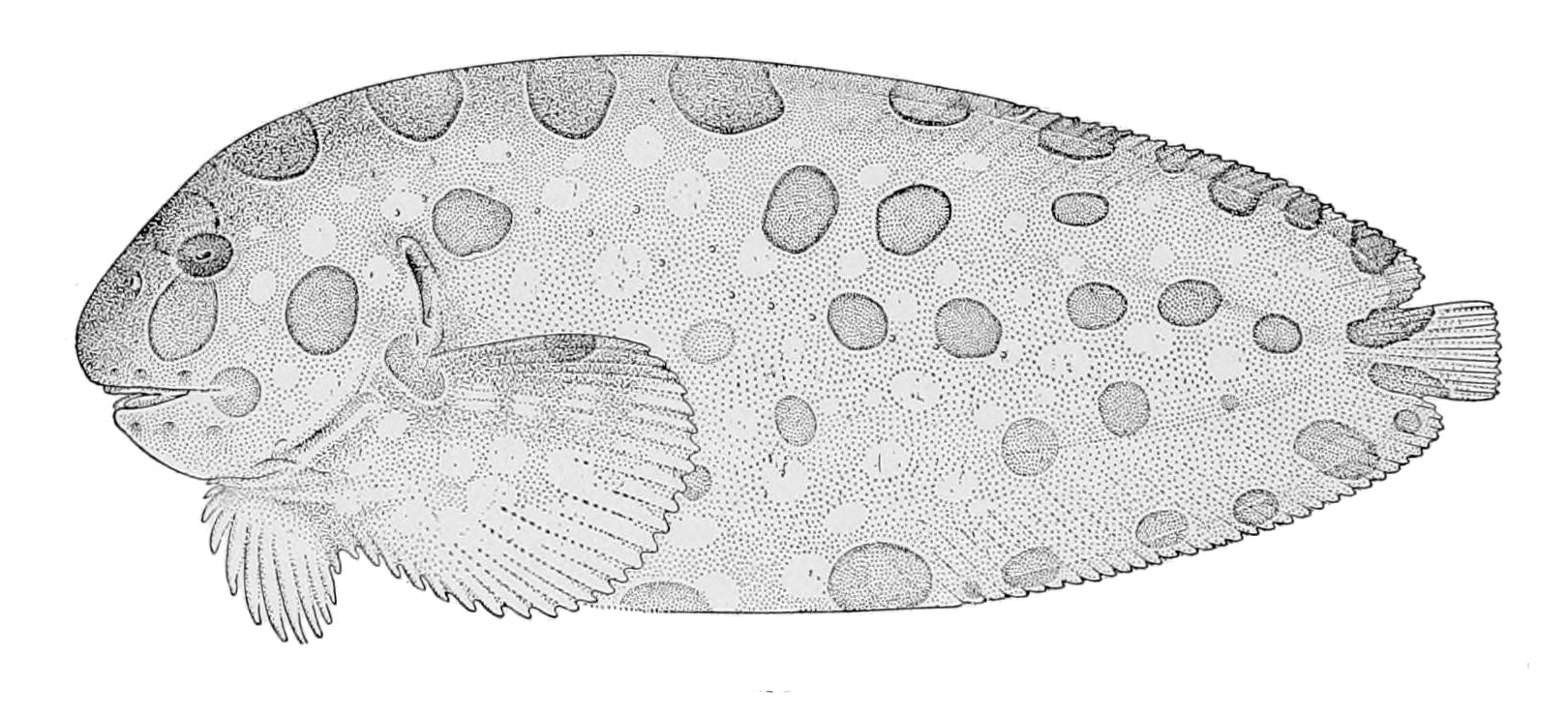
Crystallichthys cyclospilus

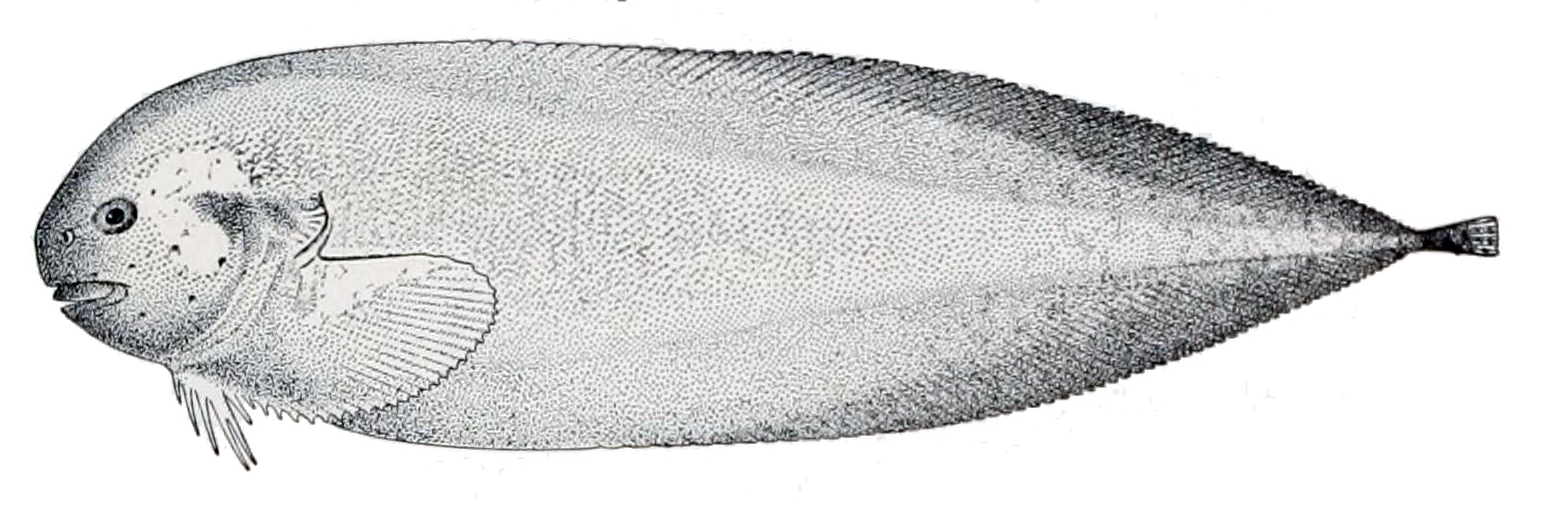
Elassodiscus tremebundus

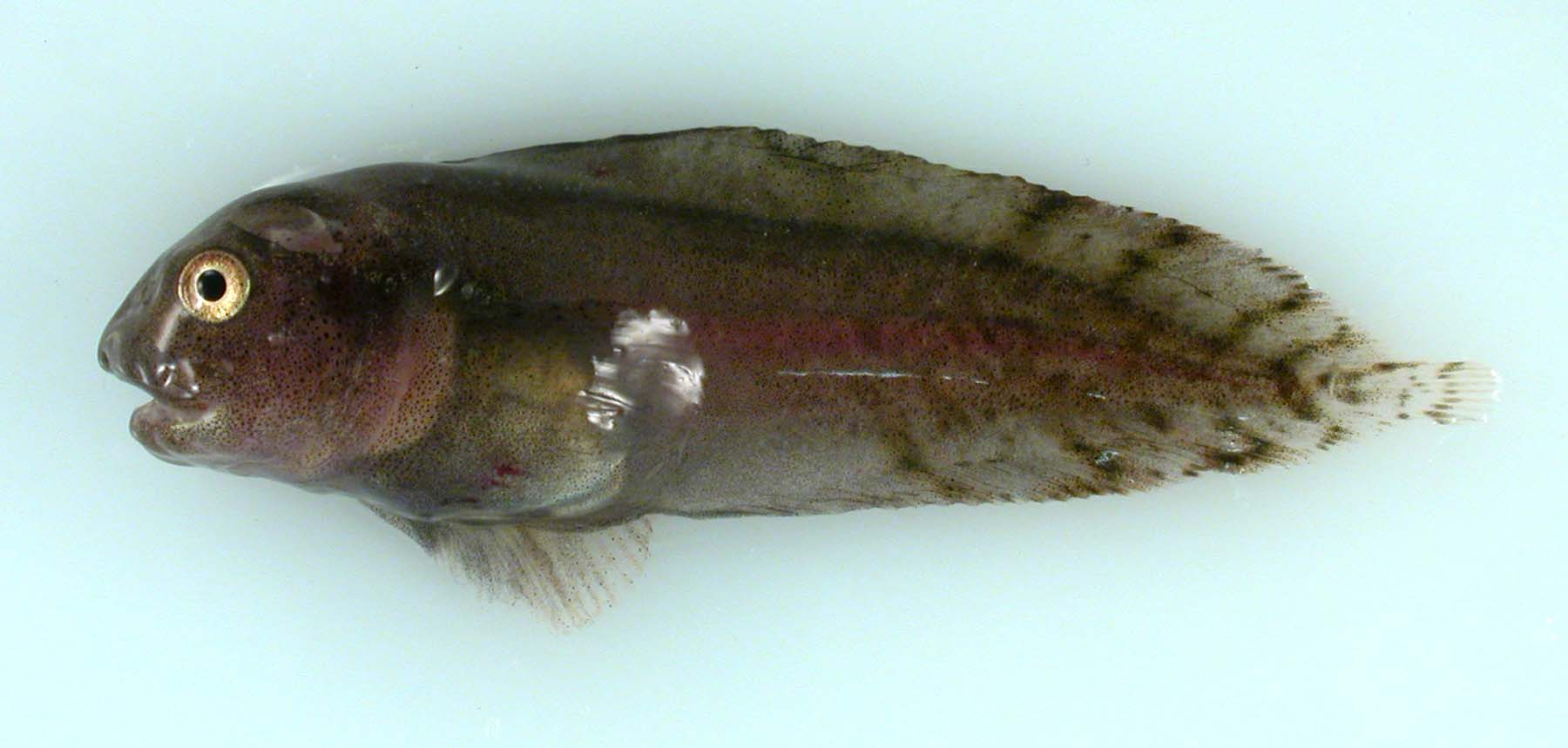
Liparis fabricii

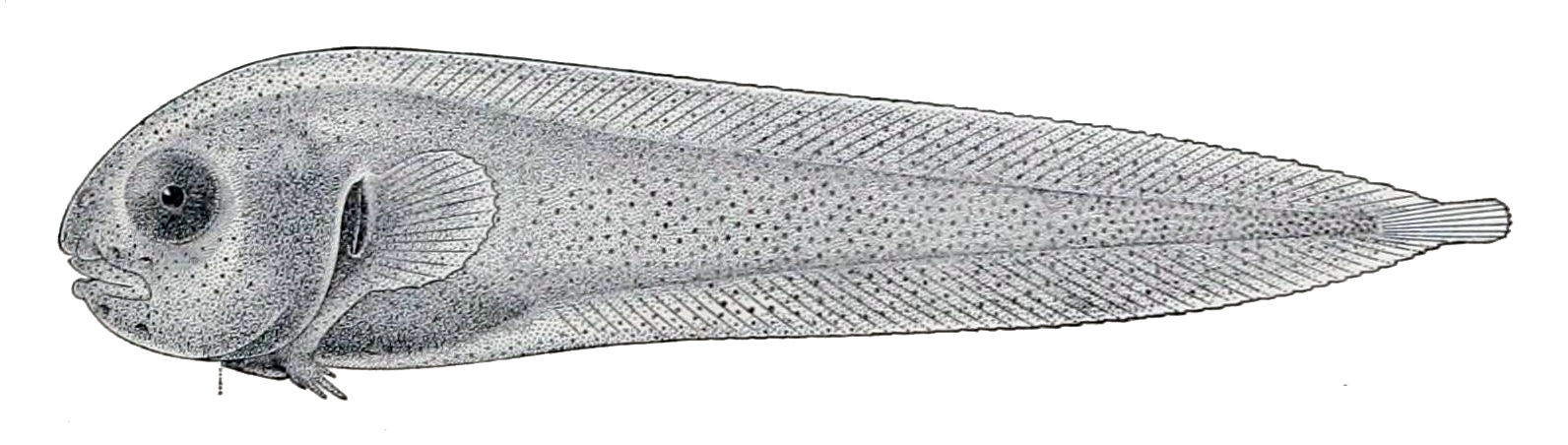
Nectoliparis pelagicus

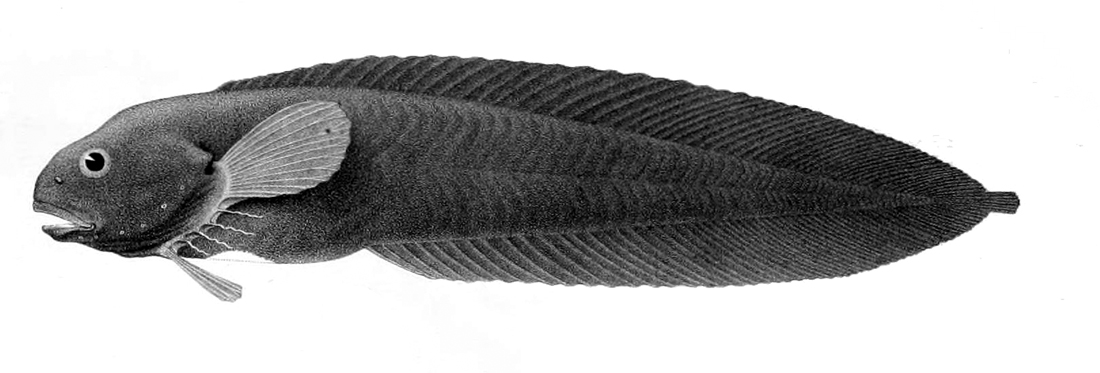
Paraliparis bathybius

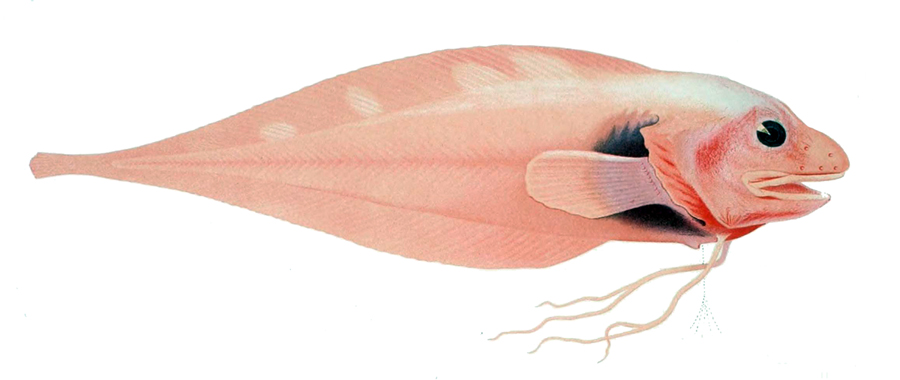
Rhodichthys regina

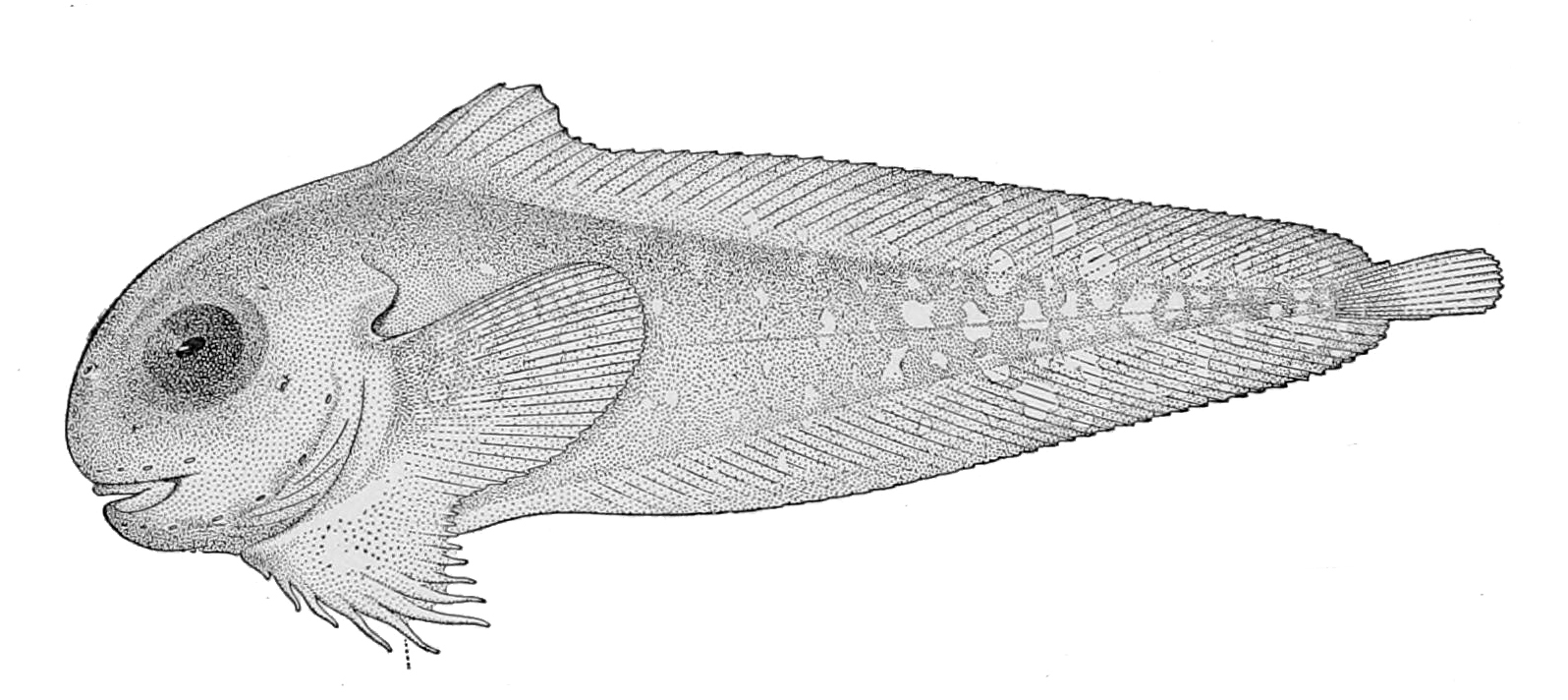
Temnocora candida
