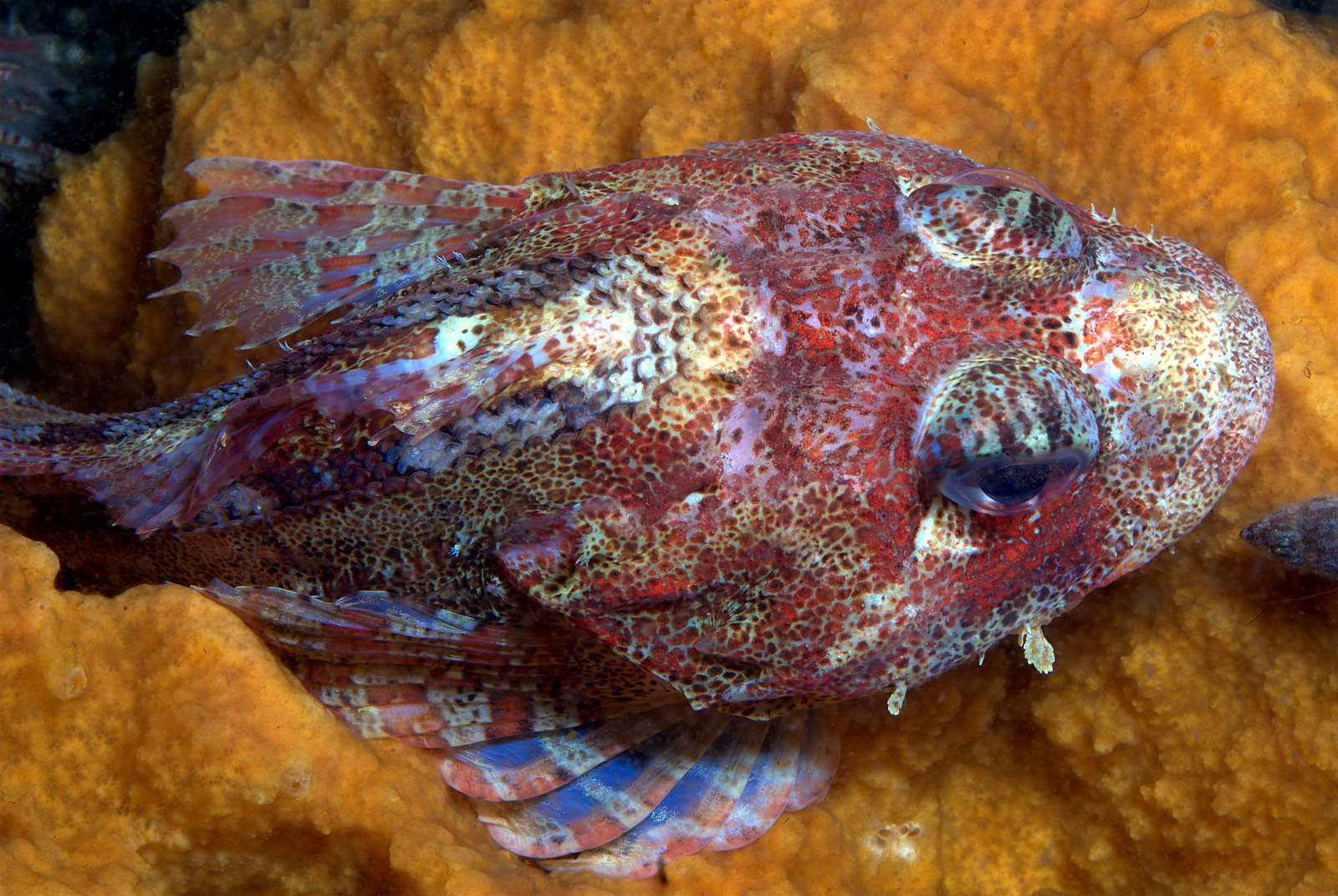

Conservation status
- Least Concern (IUCN 3.1)

Scientific classification
- Kingdom: Animalia
- Phylum: Chordata
- Class: Actinopterygii
- Division: Teleostei
- Order: Perciformes
- Suborder: Cottoidei
- Family: Hemilepidotidae
- Genus: Hemilepidotus
- Species: H. hemilepidotus

Binomial name
- Hemilepidotus hemilepidotus (Tilesius, 1811)

Synonyms
- Cottus hemilepidotus Tilesius, 1811; Cottus trachurus Pallas, 1814; Hemilepidotus trachurus (Pallas, 1814)

= Red Irish lord =

Species of fish

The red Irish lord (Hemilepidotus hemilepidotus) is a species of marine ray-finned fish in the family Agonidae. It is found in the northern Pacific Ocean, from Russia to Alaska and as far south as Monterey Bay. It is a distinctly red fish, with brown, yellow, white, and black mottling, that is generally around 30 cm (12 in) long, though specimens can grow to up to 51 cm (20 in) in length. German naturalist Wilhelm Gottlieb Tilesius formally described it in 1811. Carnivorous, it hides camouflaged among rocks on the ocean floor and lashes out to seize its prey—crabs, fish and shrimp.

== Taxonomy ==
German naturalist Wilhelm Gottlieb Tilesius formally described the red Irish lord in 1811 as Cottus hemilepidotus, from material collected off Petropavlovsk-Kamchatsky in the Kamchatka Peninsula. The species (and genus) name is derived from the Ancient Greek words hemi "half", lepis "scale", and ous, otis "ear". The genus was erected in 1829 by French zoologist Georges Cuvier in the second edition of his work Le Règne Animal. Prussian naturalist Peter Simon Pallas described the same species as Cottus trachurus in 1814. No subspecies are recognised and there is little geographic variation across its range.

== Description ==
The red Irish lord grows to an average length of about 30 cm (12 in), with a maximum recorded length of 51 cm (20 in), and a maximum recorded weight of 1,100 g (39 oz). As with most sculpins, it is only partially scaled and has a broad head and large eyes, with a slimmer body. Red Irish lords are also characterized by a dorsal fin separated into three notches, with an average of 10 to 12 dorsal spines, and 18–20 dorsal soft rays. It possesses several bands of scales along its body, the dorsal band being about 4–5 scales wide, with another band below the lateral line that is about 10 scales wide. However, there are no scales on its underside. It features frontal cirri of 4–8 barbels, and nasal cirri of 4–8 barbels, while lacking fleshy flaps on its nostrils. It has 35 vertebrae. The red Irish lord can be identified by its namesake red coloration, which can also contain brown, white, and black mottling. It is generally darker above and paler to almost white below. Spotting and mottling is more prominent in larger fish, and always visible on specimens over 6 cm (2.4 in) long. The pectoral and anal fins are mottled. The pelvic fins are pale, but are spotted or dark in large males. It can also change color to blend in with its surroundings.

The similar brown Irish lord has a dorsal band that is 6–8 (rather than 4–5) scales wide, while the yellow Irish lord has more slender cirri.

== Distribution and habitat ==
The red Irish lord lives in temperate, demersal marine environments between 66°N and 34°N. They are found mostly along the coastal waters of the Northern Pacific Ocean, from the Bering Sea in Russia, to Alaska, to the Western coast of the U.S. as far as Monterey Bay in California, although rare that far south. Red Irish lords are sculpins, and therefore benthic, bottom-dwelling fish that inhabit mostly shallow waters, but can live at deeper depths. They prefer a coastal, rocky habitat in reefs and shallow areas in the intertidal zone up to about 50 m (160 ft) in depth, but their distribution can range all the way up to 450 m (1,500 ft). Their hunting strategy and camouflaged coloration lend themselves to hiding at the sea floor among sand, rocks and other marine life, while waiting to ambush prey. They are not harmful to humans.

== Diet and behavior ==
The red Irish lord is a carnivorous ambush predator, using its camouflage to blend in with the ocean floor, where it sits motionless and waits to strike at passing prey. Living mostly on the bottom, its main food sources are crabs, small fish, shrimp, mussels, and barnacles. Like many other sculpins, it tends to hide within rock crevices, strike out for food and quickly resume its position. They are typically discarded by commercial fisheries.

The red Irish lord is preyed upon by the North American river otter.

== Life cycle ==
Hemilepidotus hemilepidotus is a non-migratory species. Its life cycle consists of five stages of development: egg, larvae, pre-juvenile, juvenile, and the adult stage. While the red Irish lord exhibits primarily maternal guarding of young, males have been shown to build and guard nests into which the females then lay eggs. The eggs are laid in a mass between October and January, the guarding fish retreating with low tide. Juveniles typically live in tide pools for some period of time.
