= Allocareproctus unangas =

Goldeneye snailfish

Scientific classification
- Kingdom: Animalia
- Phylum: Chordata
- Class: Actinopterygii
- Order: Perciformes
- Suborder: Cottoidei
- Family: Liparidae
- Genus: Allocareproctus
- Species: A. unangas

Binomial name
- Allocareproctus unangas J. W. Orr & Busby, 2006

Species of fish

Allocareproctus unangas, the goldeneye snailfish, is a species of marine ray-finned fishes belonging to the family Liparidae, the snailfishes. These fish are found in the North Pacific Ocean inhabiting the Aleutian Islands.

== Size ==
This species reaches a length of 13.0 cm (5.1 in).

== Etymology ==
The fish's name, "unangas", is the autonym of the Aleuts of Atka Island, a major island near the center of this fish's distribution, and so honors the people of the Aleutian Islands.
