= Allocareproctus ungak =

Whiskered snailfish

Scientific classification
- Kingdom: Animalia
- Phylum: Chordata
- Class: Actinopterygii
- Order: Perciformes
- Suborder: Cottoidei
- Family: Liparidae
- Genus: Allocareproctus
- Species: A. ungak

Binomial name
- Allocareproctus ungak J. W. Orr & Busby, 2006

Species of fish

Allocareproctus ungak, the whiskered snailfish, is a species of marine ray-finned fishes belonging to the family Liparidae, the snailfishes. These fish are found in the Northeast Pacific Ocean, inhabiting the Aleutian Islands.

== Size ==
This species reaches a length of 12.9 cm (5.1 in).

== Etymology ==
The fish's name means, in Alutiiq, the native language of the Alaskan Peninsula, where this snailfish occurs, "whiskers", referring to the strong papillae on its many cephalic pores.
