= Allocareproctus =

Scientific classification
- Kingdom: Animalia
- Phylum: Chordata
- Class: Actinopterygii
- Order: Perciformes
- Suborder: Cottoidei
- Family: Liparidae
- Genus: Allocareproctus; Pitruk & Fedorov, 1993

Type species
- Careproctus jordani Burke, 1930

Genus of fishes

Allocareproctus is a genus of marine ray-finned fishes belonging to the family Liparidae, the snailfishes. These fish are found in the northern Pacific Ocean.

== Taxonomy ==
Allocareproctus was first proposed as a monospecific genus in 1993 by the Russian ichthyologists Dmitry Leonidovich Pitruk and Vladimir Vladimirovich Fedorov with Careproctus jordani as its only species. C. jordani had been described in 1930 by Charles Victor Burke with its type locality in Sagami Bay in Japan. In 2006 James Wilder Orr and Morgan Scott Busby reviewed the genus, described 4 new species from the Aleutian Islands and confirmed the genus as a valid genus.

== Etymology ==
Allocareproctus is made up of Careproctus, the original genus of A. jordani, prefixed with allo, which means "other", i.e. close to Careproctus.

== Species ==
Allocareproctus has 5 species currently classified within it:

- Allocareproctus jordani (Burke, 1930) (Cherry snailfish)
- Allocareproctus kallaion J. W. Orr & Busby, 2006 (Combed snailfish)
- Allocareproctus tanix J. W. Orr & Busby, 2006 (Peach snailfish)
- Allocareproctus unangas J. W. Orr & Busby, 2006 (Goldeneye snailfish)
- Allocareproctus ungak J. W. Orr & Busby, 2006 (Whiskered snailfish)

== Characteristics ==
Allocareproctus is characterized by the first 4 to 8 rays of the dorsal fin having their tips free of the fin membrane and they have papillae associated with of the sensory system on the head. In the skull the symplectic bone extends to the central faces of the quadrate bone and the metapterygoid. The largest species is A. jordani which has a maximum published total length of 34 cm (13 in).

== Distribution and habitat ==
Allocareproctus snailfishes are only found in the northern Pacific Ocean from Japan to the Aleutian Islands. They are bathydemersal fishes found in deep water down to 631 m (2,070 ft).
