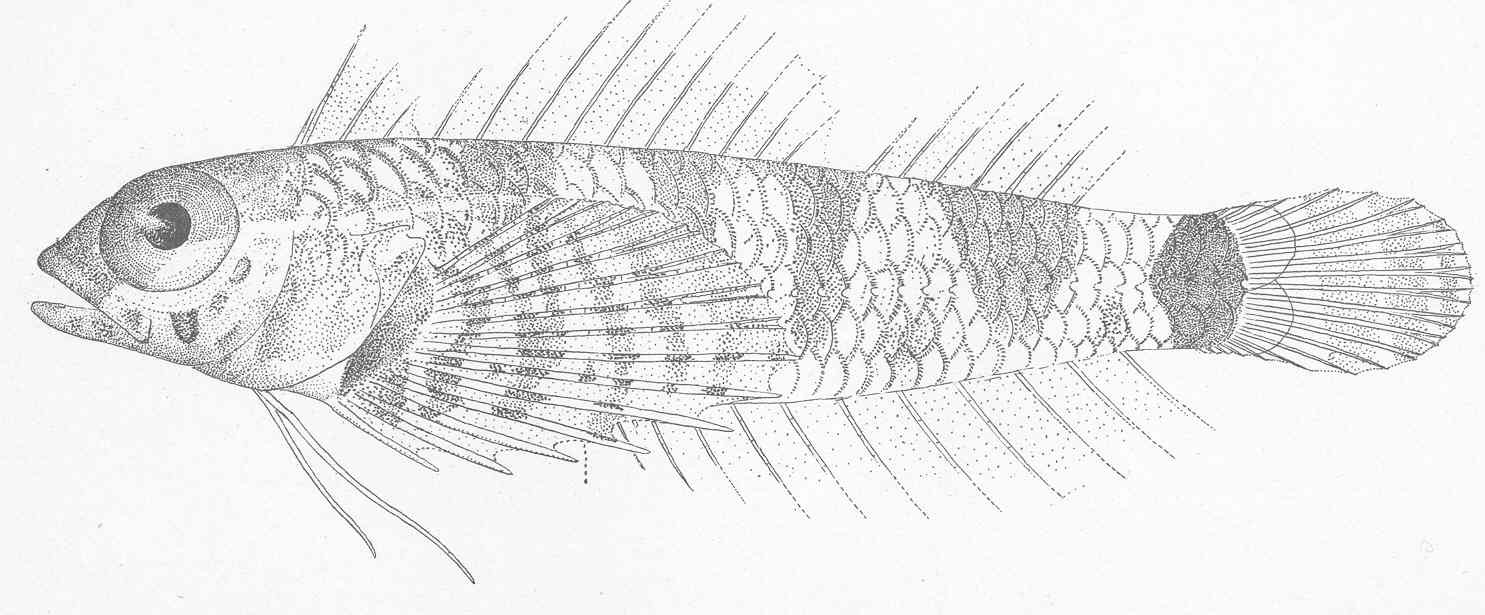

Conservation status
- Least Concern (IUCN 3.1)

Scientific classification
- Kingdom: Animalia
- Phylum: Chordata
- Class: Actinopterygii
- Order: Blenniiformes
- Family: Tripterygiidae
- Genus: Enneanectes
- Species: E. carminalis

Binomial name
- Enneanectes carminalis (Jordan & Gilbert, 1882)

Synonyms
- Axoclinus carminalis (Jordan & Gilbert, 1882); Enneanectes sexmaculatus (Fowler, 1944); Gillias sexmaculatus Fowler, 1944; Tripterygium carminale Jordan & Gilbert, 1882

= Enneanectes carminalis =

Species of fish

Enneanectes carminalis, known commonlfix small tagy as the carmine triplefin or the delicate triplefin in Mexico and the United Kingdom, is a species of triplefin blenny. It is a tropical blenny known from reefs from Mexico to Panama, in the eastern central Pacific Ocean. It was originally described by D.S. Jordan and C.H. Gilbert in 1882, as Tripterygium carminale. Blennies in this species can reach a maximum length of 3 centimetres, and feed primarily off of benthic algae and invertebrates.
