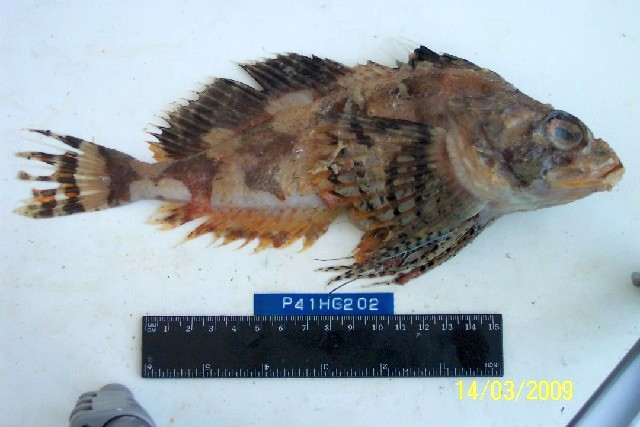

Scientific classification
- Kingdom: Animalia
- Phylum: Chordata
- Class: Actinopterygii
- Order: Perciformes
- Suborder: Cottoidei
- Family: Agonidae
- Genus: Hemilepidotus
- Species: H. gilberti

Binomial name
- Hemilepidotus gilberti Jordan & Starks, 1904

= Hemilepidotus gilberti =

Species of fish

Hemilepidotus gilberti, Gilbert's Irish lord, is a species of marine ray-finned fish belonging to the family Agonidae, the poachers and sea ravens. This species occurs in the Northwestern Pacific Ocean from Hokkaido to the Bering Sea.

== Taxonomy ==
Hemilepidotus gilberti was first formally described in 1904 by the American ichthyologists David Starr Jordan and Edwin Chapin Starks with its type locality given as Hakodate on Hokkaido. The specific name honors Jordan's fellow Stanford University academic, the ichthyologist and fisheries biologist, Charles Henry Gilbert.

== Description ==
Hemilepidotus gilberti has 11 or 12 spines in its first dorsal fin, with the first spine being longer than the second, and a total of between 20 and 22 soft rays in its dorsal fins. There are no spines ion the anal fin which is supported by 14 to 19 soft rays. There are three zones of scale rows on the body and a scale row of small ctenoid scales beneath the ventral scale row. There are 4 spines on the preoperculum with the simple second spine being the and the fourth being flattened. The maximum published standard length is 36 cm (14 in), although a total length of 27 cm (11 in) is more typical, while the maximum published weight is 800 g (28 oz).

== Distribution and habitat ==
Hemilepidotus gilberti is found in the Northwestern Pacific Ocean from the Strait of Tartary, northeastern Sakhalin, the western Kamchatka Peninsula east into the Bering Sea as far as the Commander Islands and south to the southeastern coast of Korea, Gulf of Patience and along the western and southern coasts of Hokkaido. This demersal fish is found at depths between 9 and 668 m (30 and 2,192 ft). During the summer, they show a preference for the upper and middle zones of the continental shelf where the water temperature is between 1.5 and 3.0 °C (34.7 and 37.4 °F), while in the winter they occur deeper water in the lower part of the continental sheld and upper continental slope where the temperature is just above freezing. The juveniles occur at shallower depths than the adults.
