= Allocareproctus kallaion =

Combed snailfish

Scientific classification
- Kingdom: Animalia
- Phylum: Chordata
- Class: Actinopterygii
- Order: Perciformes
- Suborder: Cottoidei
- Family: Liparidae
- Genus: Allocareproctus
- Species: A. kallaion

Binomial name
- Allocareproctus kallaion J. W. Orr & Busby, 2006

Species of fish

Allocareproctus kallaion, the combed snailfish, is a species of marine ray-finned fishes belonging to the family Liparidae, the snailfishes. These fish are found in the Northeast Pacific Ocean, inhabiting the east-central Aleutian Islands.

== Size ==
This species reaches a length of 19.5 cm (7.7 in).

== Etymology ==
The fish's name in Greek means "comb", which refers to the multiple projections on the orobuccal valve and a single row of teeth on the posterior part of the dentary.
