= Allocareproctus tanix =

Peach snailfish

Scientific classification
- Kingdom: Animalia
- Phylum: Chordata
- Class: Actinopterygii
- Order: Perciformes
- Suborder: Cottoidei
- Family: Liparidae
- Genus: Allocareproctus
- Species: A. tanix

Binomial name
- Allocareproctus tanix J. W. Orr & Busby, 2006

Species of fish

Allocareproctus tanix, the peach snailfish, is a species of marine ray-finned fishes belonging to the family Liparidae, the snailfishes. These fish are found in the North Pacific Ocean in the Eastern and central Aleutian Islands.

== Size ==
This species reaches a length of 7.8 cm (3.1 in).

== Etymology ==
The fish's name is an Aleut word meaning "forehead", referring to the absence of nasal papillae on its pale head. The species is endemic to the Aleutian Islands, hence the use of a local language.
