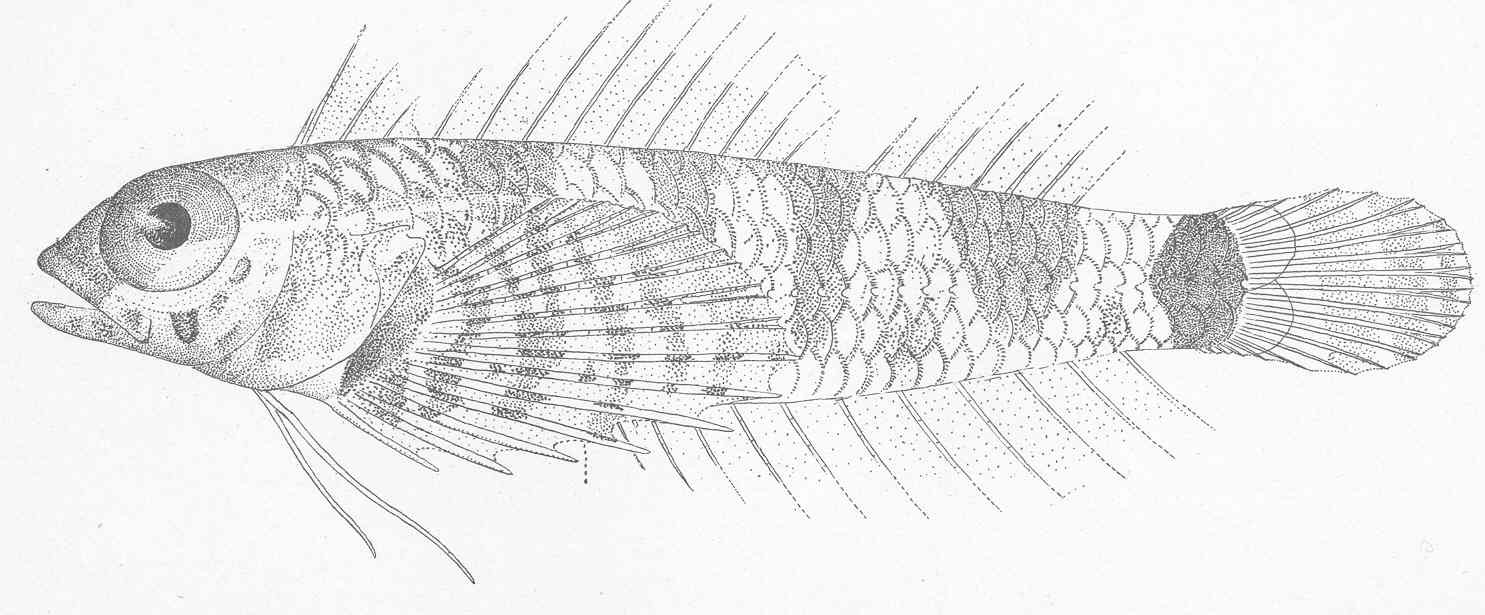
- Enneanectes carminalis

Scientific classification
- Kingdom: Animalia
- Phylum: Chordata
- Class: Actinopterygii
- Order: Blenniiformes
- Family: Tripterygiidae
- Subfamily: Tripterygiinae
- Genus: Enneanectes; D. S. Jordan & Evermann, 1895

Type species
- Tripterygium carminale D.S. Jordan & Gilbert, 1882

Synonyms
- Gillias Evermann & Marsh, 1899

= Enneanectes =

Genus of fishes

Enneanectes is a genus of triplefin fish in the family Tripterygiidae.

== Species ==
There are currently 15 recognized species in this genus:

- Enneanectes altivelis Rosenblatt, 1960 (Lofty triplefin)
- Enneanectes atrorus Rosenblatt, 1960 (Blackedge triplefin)
- Enneanectes boehlkei Rosenblatt, 1960 (Roughhead triplefin)
- Enneanectes carminalis D. S. Jordan & C. H. Gilbert, 1882 (Carmine triplefin)
- Enneanectes deloachorum Victor, 2013
- Enneanectes exsul Rosenblatt, 2013 (Island triplefin)
- Enneanectes flavus Victor, 2019
- Enneanectes glendae Rosenblatt, 2013 (Slender triplefin)
- Enneanectes jordani Evermann & Marsh, 1899 (Mimic triplefin)
- Enneanectes macrops Rosenblatt, 2013 (Mexican triplefin)
- Enneanectes matador Victor, 2013
- Enneanectes quadra Victor, 2017
- Enneanectes reticulatus G. R. Allen & D. R. Robertson, 1991 (Network triplefin)
- Enneanectes smithi Lubbock & A. J. Edwards, 1981
- Enneanectes wilki Victor, 2013

== Gallery ==
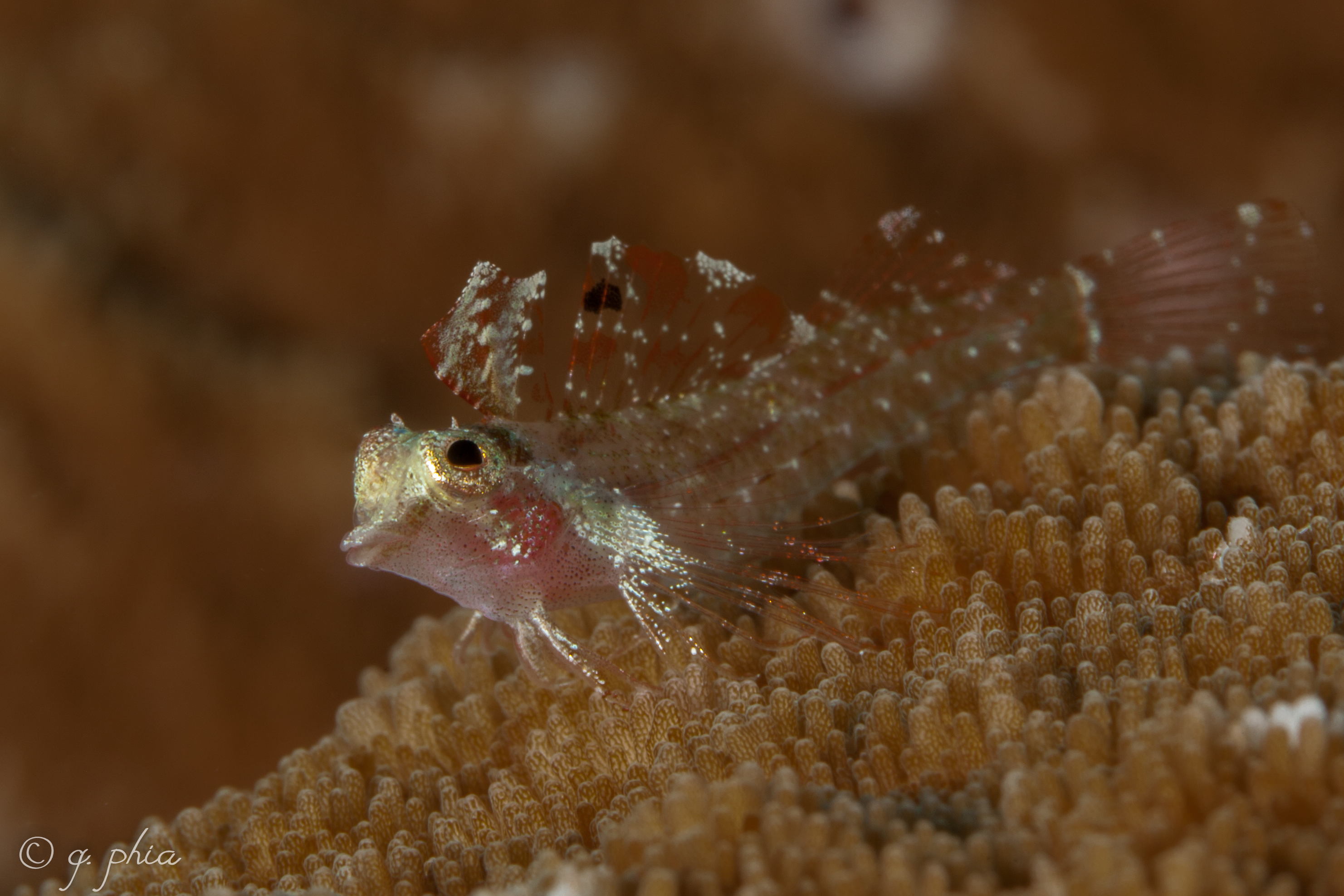
Unknown species of Enneanectes at Wakatobi National Park, triple fin blennie, 2016

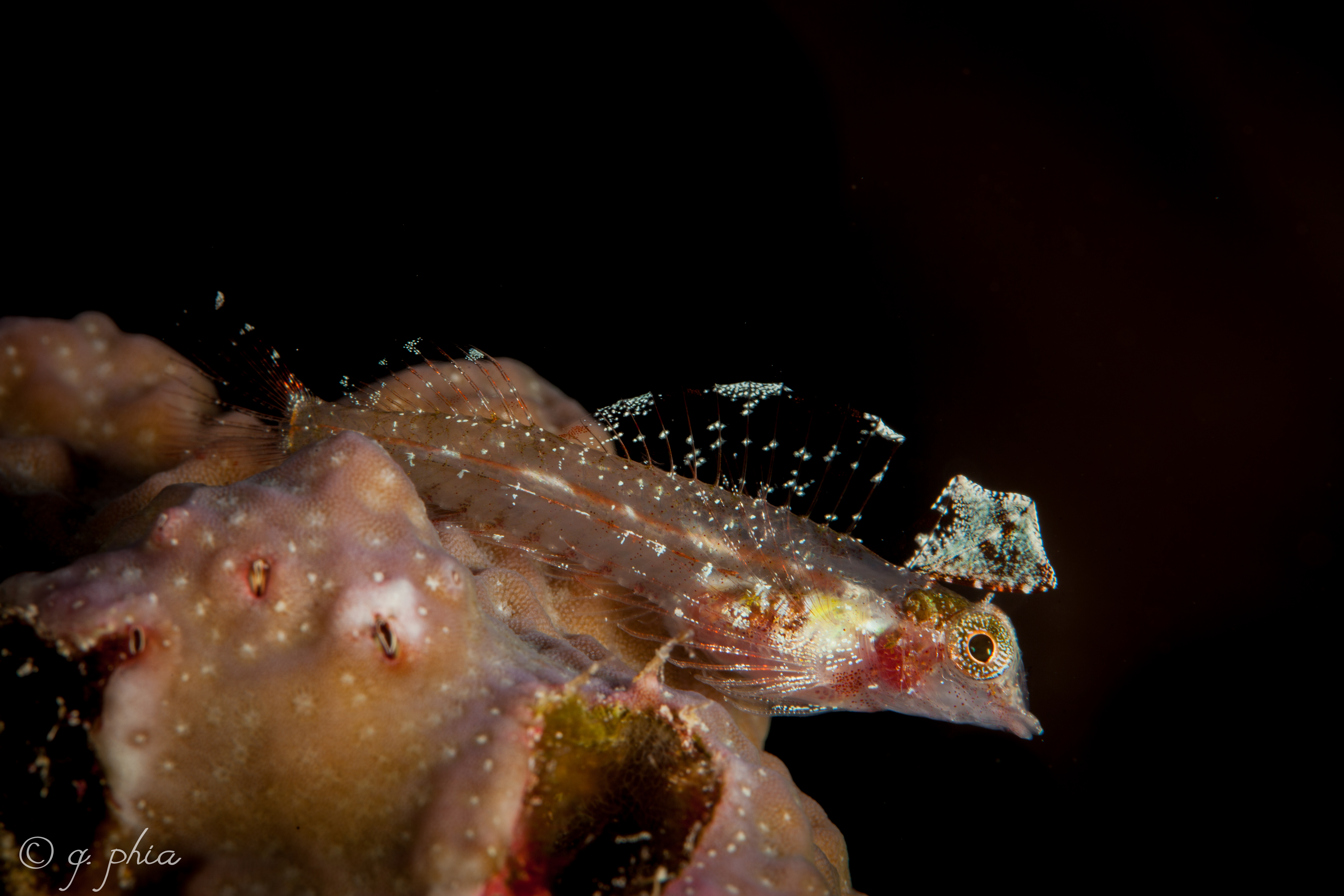
Unknown species of Enneanectes at Wakatobi National Park, triple fin blennie, 2018

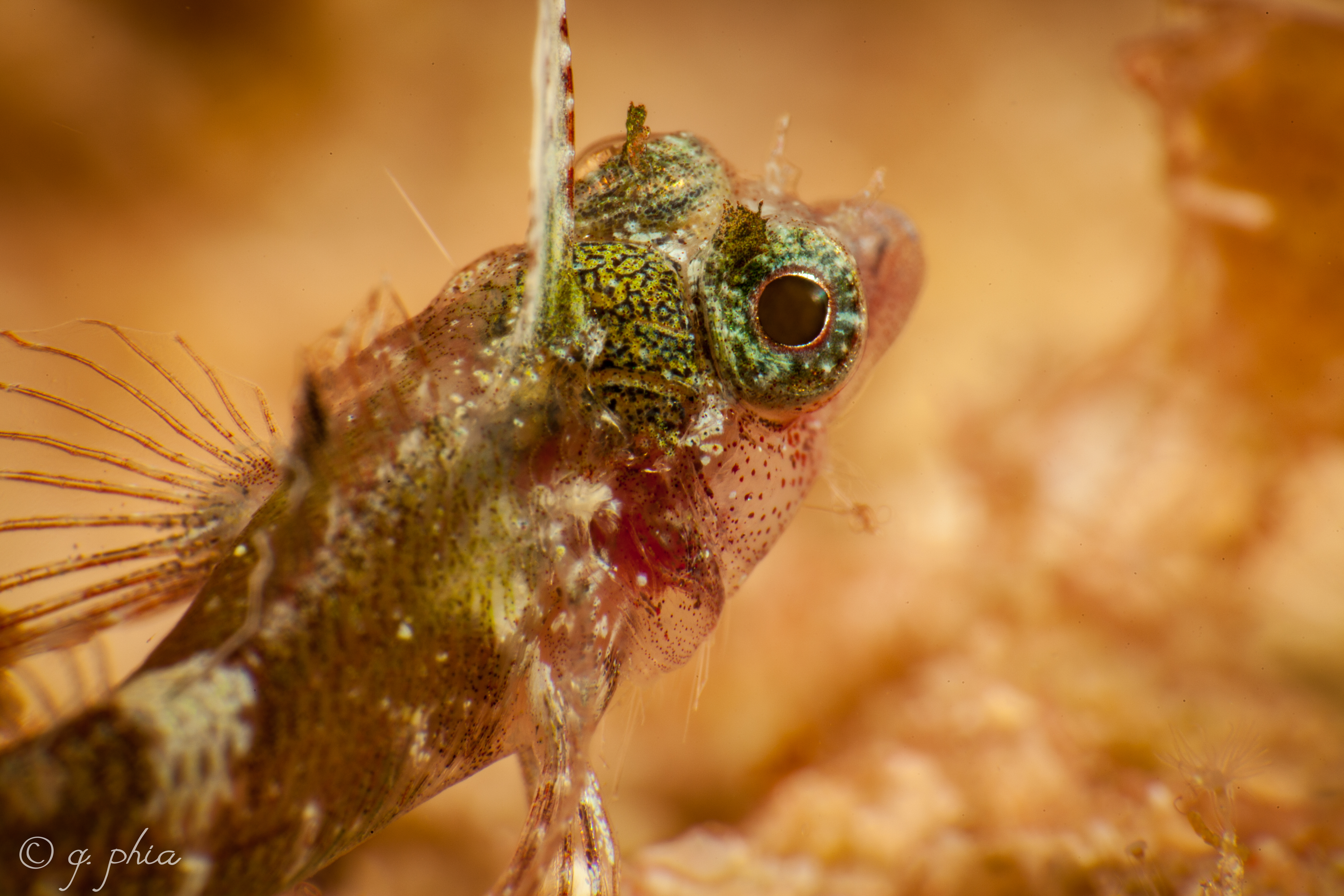
Triple fin blennie details of Enneanectes at Wakatobi National Park, triple fin blennie, 2018
