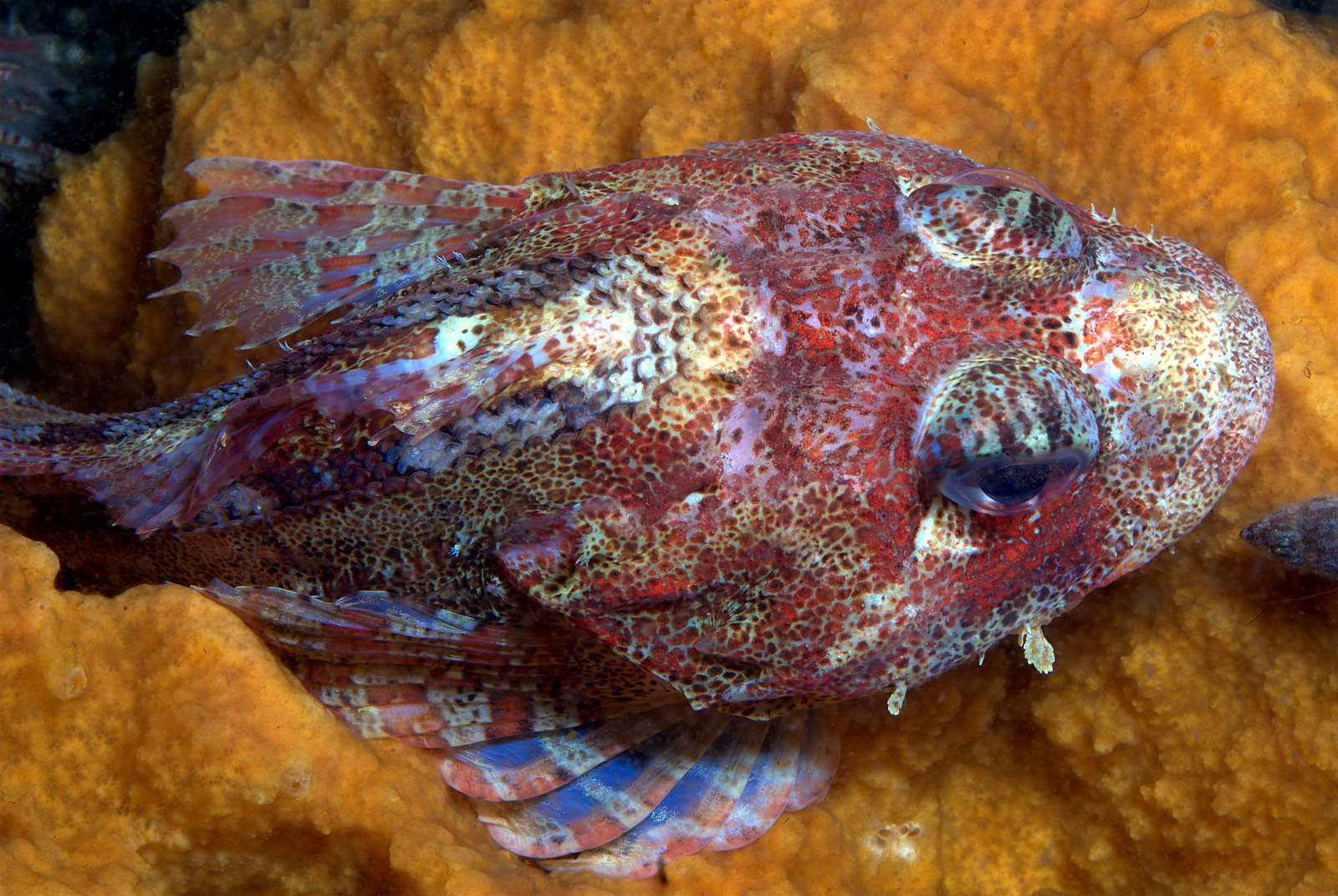
- H. hemilepidotus, the red Irish lord, is the type species

Scientific classification
- Kingdom: Animalia
- Phylum: Chordata
- Class: Actinopterygii
- Order: Perciformes
- Suborder: Cottoidei
- Family: Hemilepidotidae; Jordan & Evermann, 1898
- Genus: Hemilepidotus; G. Cuvier, 1829

Type species
- Cottus hemilepidotus Tilesius, 1811

Synonyms
- Calycilepidotus Ayres, 1855; Melletes Bean, 1880; Neohemilepidotus Sakamoto, 1932; Temnistia Richardson, 1836

= Hemilepidotus =

Genus of fishes

Hemilepidotus, the Irish lords, is a genus of ray-finned fishes and the only member of the family Hemilepidotidae. These fishes are found in the northern Pacific Ocean and adjacent regions of the Arctic Ocean.

They were previously placed as the subfamily Hemilepidotinae in the family Agonidae, the poachers and sea ravens. However, a 2026 study found it to form a distinct clade with Nautichthys and Hemitripteridae, and morphologically distinct enough to deserve its own family.

== Species ==
There are currently six recognized species in this genus:

- Hemilepidotus gilberti D. S. Jordan & Starks, 1904 (Gilbert's Irish lord)
- Hemilepidotus hemilepidotus (Tilesius, 1811) (Red Irish lord)
- Hemilepidotus jordani T. H. Bean, 1881 (Yellow Irish lord)
- Hemilepidotus papilio (T. H. Bean, 1880) (Butterfly sculpin)
- Hemilepidotus spinosus Ayres, 1854 (Brown Irish lord)
- Hemilepidotus zapus C. H. Gilbert & Burke, 1912 (Longfin Irish lord)
