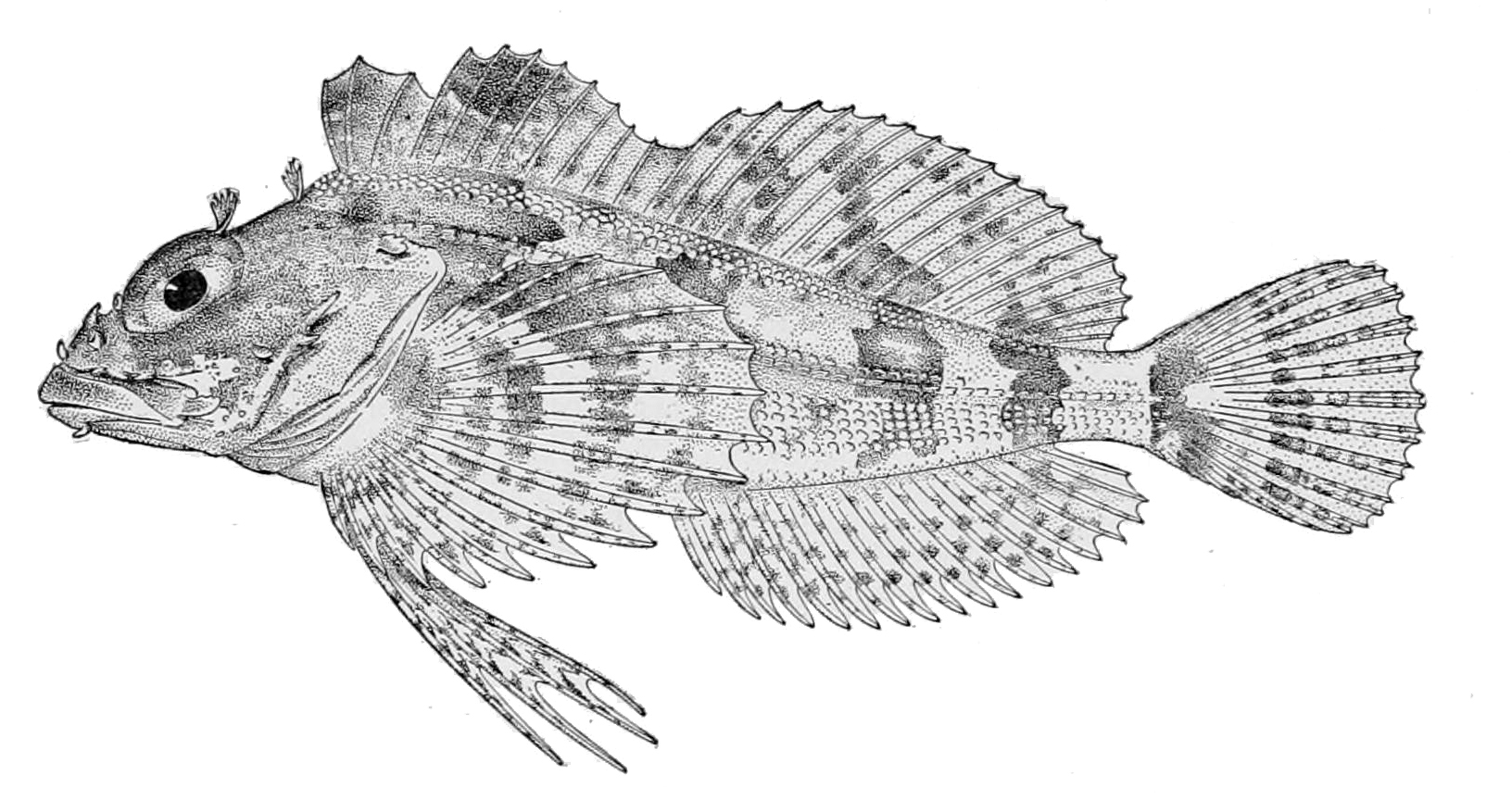

Scientific classification
- Kingdom: Animalia
- Phylum: Chordata
- Class: Actinopterygii
- Order: Perciformes
- Suborder: Cottoidei
- Family: Hemilepidotidae
- Genus: Hemilepidotus
- Species: H. zapus

Binomial name
- Hemilepidotus zapus Gilbert & Burke, 1912

= Longfin Irish lord =

Species of fish

The longfin Irish lord (Hemilepidotus zapus) is a species of fish native to the north Pacific Ocean.
