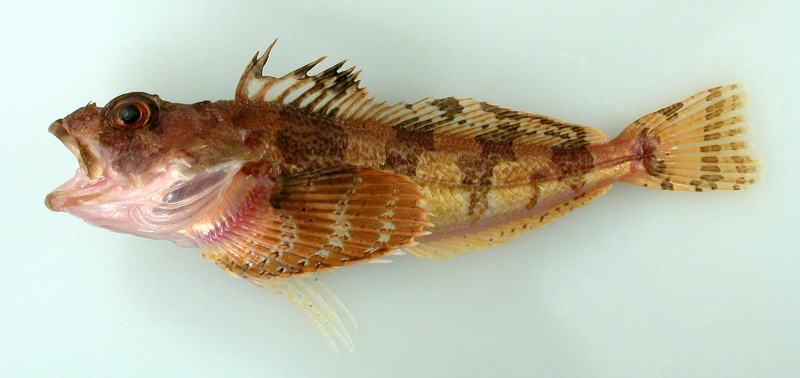

Conservation status
- Least Concern (IUCN 3.1)

Scientific classification
- Kingdom: Animalia
- Phylum: Chordata
- Class: Actinopterygii
- Order: Perciformes
- Suborder: Cottoidei
- Family: Agonidae
- Genus: Hemilepidotus
- Species: H. papilio

Binomial name
- Hemilepidotus papilio (Bean, 1880)

Synonyms
- Melletes papilio Bean, 1880

= Butterfly sculpin =

Species of fish

The butterfly sculpin (Hemilepidotus papillon) is a species of fish in the family Agonidae. It is found in the North Pacific Ocean.

== Taxonomy ==
The butterfly sculpin was first formally described in 1880 as Melletes papilio by the American ichthyologist Tarleton Hoffman Bean with its type locality given as Saint Paul Island in the Pribilof Islands in the Bering Sea off Alaska. Bean proposed the monospecific genus Melletes for the butterfly sculpin but later workers have placed it in the genus Hemilepidotus. The specific name papilio means "butterfly".

== Description ==
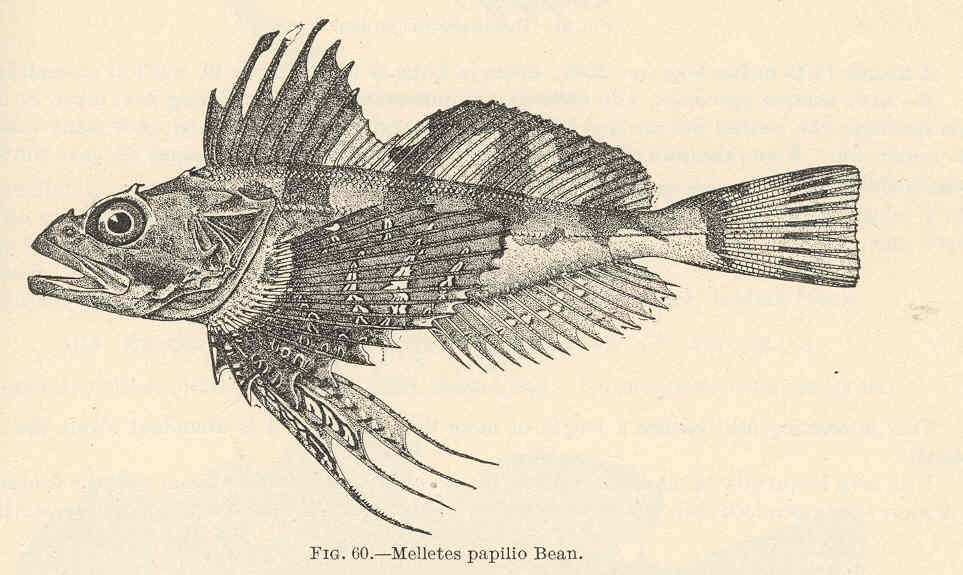
Illustration of M. papilio, the type species for genus Melletes

The butterfly sculpin is reddish brown, yellow and white in color, with a metallic gold sheen. There are four blackish bars on the upper flanks which extend onto the dorsal fin, these bands vary in their definition. This fish has between 11 and 13 spines and 19 or 20 soft rays in its dorsal fins while there are no spines and between 16 and 18 soft rays in its anal fin.The scales in the ventral scale row are less than half the size of the scales in the dorsal scale row. The membrane of the first, spiny dorsal fin is deeply notched. There are four spines on the preoperculum with the fourt spine being simple. The maximum published fork length is 45 cm (18 in), and maximum weight of 960 g (34 oz).

== Distribution ==
The butterfly sculpin lives in benthopelagic marine environments of the northern Pacific Ocean and the Sea of Okhotsk, in sandy or silty flat areas. It is usually found at depths of 41–80 m (135–262 ft) and water temperature from −0.9 to 10.7 °C.

== Biology ==
Butterfly sculpins are predators feeding on gammarid amphipods, crabs, ostracods and small fish such as juvenile Alaska pollock. They are oviparous laying benthic eggs which hatch into pelagic larvae which settle on the substrate as juveniles at a minimum length of 4 cm (1.6 in).
