= Allocareproctus jordani =

Cherry snailfish

Scientific classification
- Kingdom: Animalia
- Phylum: Chordata
- Class: Actinopterygii
- Order: Perciformes
- Suborder: Cottoidei
- Family: Liparidae
- Genus: Allocareproctus
- Species: A. jordani

Binomial name
- Allocareproctus jordani (Burke, 1930)

Synonyms
- Careproctus jordani Burke, 1930

Species of fish

Allocareproctus jordani, the cherry snailfish, is a species of marine ray-finned fishes belonging to the family Liparidae, the snailfishes. These fish are found in the Northwest Pacific: off of Honshu, Japan at Sagami Bay, the Kuril Islands, and the eastern Okhotsk Sea.

== Size ==
This species reaches a length of 34.0 cm (13.4 in).

== Etymology ==
The fish is named in honor of ichthyologist David Starr Jordan, who co-described this species as Careproctus gilberti in 1914 but used a preoccupied name and so it was redescribed.
