= Enneanectes boehlkei =

Conservation status
- Least Concern (IUCN 3.1)

Scientific classification
- Kingdom: Animalia
- Phylum: Chordata
- Class: Actinopterygii
- Order: Blenniiformes
- Family: Tripterygiidae
- Genus: Enneanectes
- Species: E. boehlkei

Binomial name
- Enneanectes boehlkei Rosenblatt, 1960

Species of fish

Enneanectes boehlkei, known commonly as the roughhead triplefin, is a species of triplefin blenny. This species occurs in the western Atlantic Ocean from the Bahamas west into the Gulf of Mexico, including the Florida Keys to Tuxpan, Mexico and throughout the Caribbean, it is absent from most of Cuba except the north west, and off the northern South American coast its range extends from Cartagena, Colombia to the Orinoco River in Venezuela. The specific name honours the American ichthyologist James Erwin Böhlke (1930-1982) of the Academy of Natural Sciences of Philadelphia.
