= Enneanectes smithi =

Conservation status
- Vulnerable (IUCN 3.1)

Scientific classification
- Kingdom: Animalia
- Phylum: Chordata
- Class: Actinopterygii
- Order: Blenniiformes
- Family: Tripterygiidae
- Genus: Enneanectes
- Species: E. smithi

Binomial name
- Enneanectes smithi Lubbock & Edwards, 1981

Species of fish

Enneanectes smithi is a species of triplefin blenny. It was described by Hugh Roger Lubbock and Alasdair Edwards in 1981 from St Paul's Rocks in the western Atlantic Ocean. The specific name honours Roger Wellesley Smith for his assistance to the Cambridge University expedition to St Paul's Rocks but no other information is given about this individual.
