= Enneanectes atrorus =

Conservation status
- Least Concern (IUCN 3.1)

Scientific classification
- Kingdom: Animalia
- Phylum: Chordata
- Class: Actinopterygii
- Order: Blenniiformes
- Family: Tripterygiidae
- Genus: Enneanectes
- Species: E. atrorus

Binomial name
- Enneanectes atrorus Rosenblatt, 1960

Species of fish

Enneanectes atrorus, known commonly as the blackedge triplefin, is a species of triplefin blenny. It occurs in the western Atlantic Ocean from southern Florida and the Bahamassouth to St. Kitts. It is absent from the Gulf of Mexico.
