= Enneanectes reticulatus =

Conservation status
- Least Concern (IUCN 3.1)

Scientific classification
- Kingdom: Animalia
- Phylum: Chordata
- Class: Actinopterygii
- Order: Blenniiformes
- Family: Tripterygiidae
- Genus: Enneanectes
- Species: E. reticulatus

Binomial name
- Enneanectes reticulatus Allen & Robertson, 1991

Species of fish

Enneanectes reticulatus, known commonly as the network triplefin, is a species of triplefin blenny from the coastal waters of southern Baja California.
