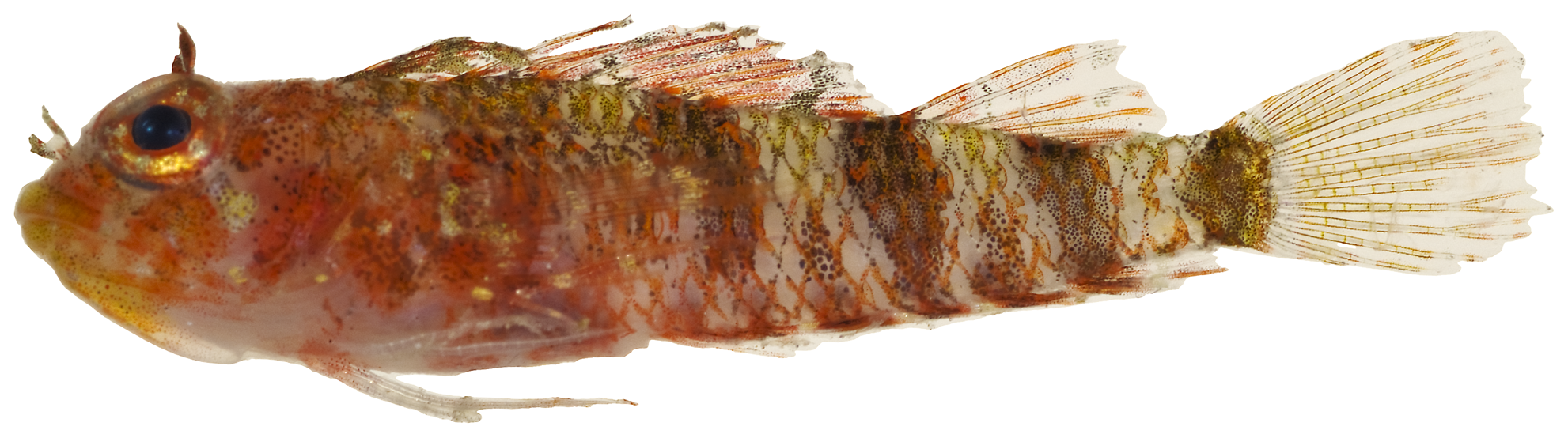

Conservation status
- Least Concern (IUCN 3.1)

Scientific classification
- Kingdom: Animalia
- Phylum: Chordata
- Class: Actinopterygii
- Order: Blenniiformes
- Family: Tripterygiidae
- Genus: Enneanectes
- Species: E. altivelis

Binomial name
- Enneanectes altivelis Rosenblatt, 1960

= Enneanectes altivelis =

Species of fish

Enneanectes altivelis, known commonly as the lofty triplefin, is a species of triplefin blenny. It is widely distributed in the warmer waters of the western Atlantic from the southern Florida to Touros in Brazil, including the Caribbean and the Gulf of Mexico.
