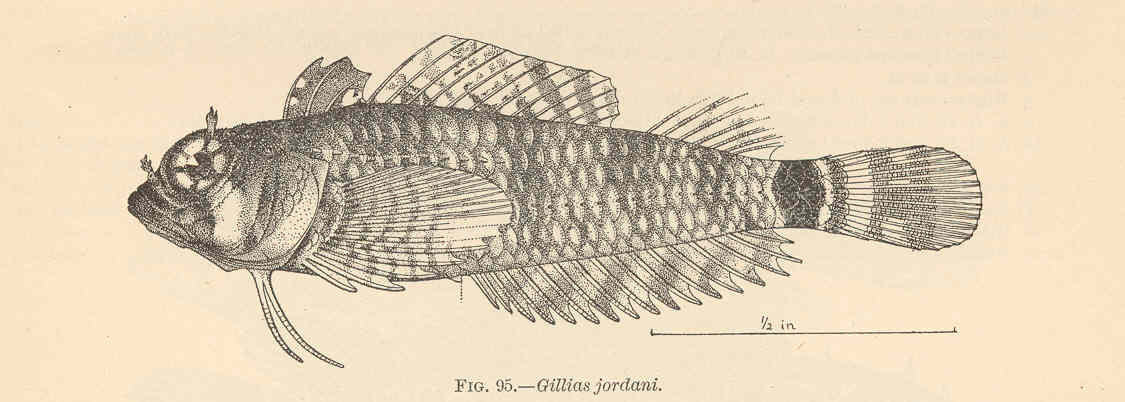

Conservation status
- Least Concern (IUCN 3.1)

Scientific classification
- Kingdom: Animalia
- Phylum: Chordata
- Class: Actinopterygii
- Order: Blenniiformes
- Family: Tripterygiidae
- Genus: Enneanectes
- Species: E. jordani

Binomial name
- Enneanectes jordani (Evermann & Marsh, 1899)

Synonyms
- Gillias jordani Evermann & Marsh, 1899; Enneapterygius jordani (Evermann & Marsh, 1899); Enneapterygius pectoralis Fowler, 1941; Enneanectes pectoralis (Fowler, 1941)

= Enneanectes jordani =

Species of fish

Enneanectes jordani, known commonly as the redbelly triplefin and the mimic triplefin, is a species of triplefin blenny from the northern Caribbean Sea and the Gulf of Mexico south as far as Venezuela. The specific name honours the American ichthyologist David Starr Jordan (1851-1931). Some authorities consider the synonym Enneanectes pectoralis to be a valid species.
