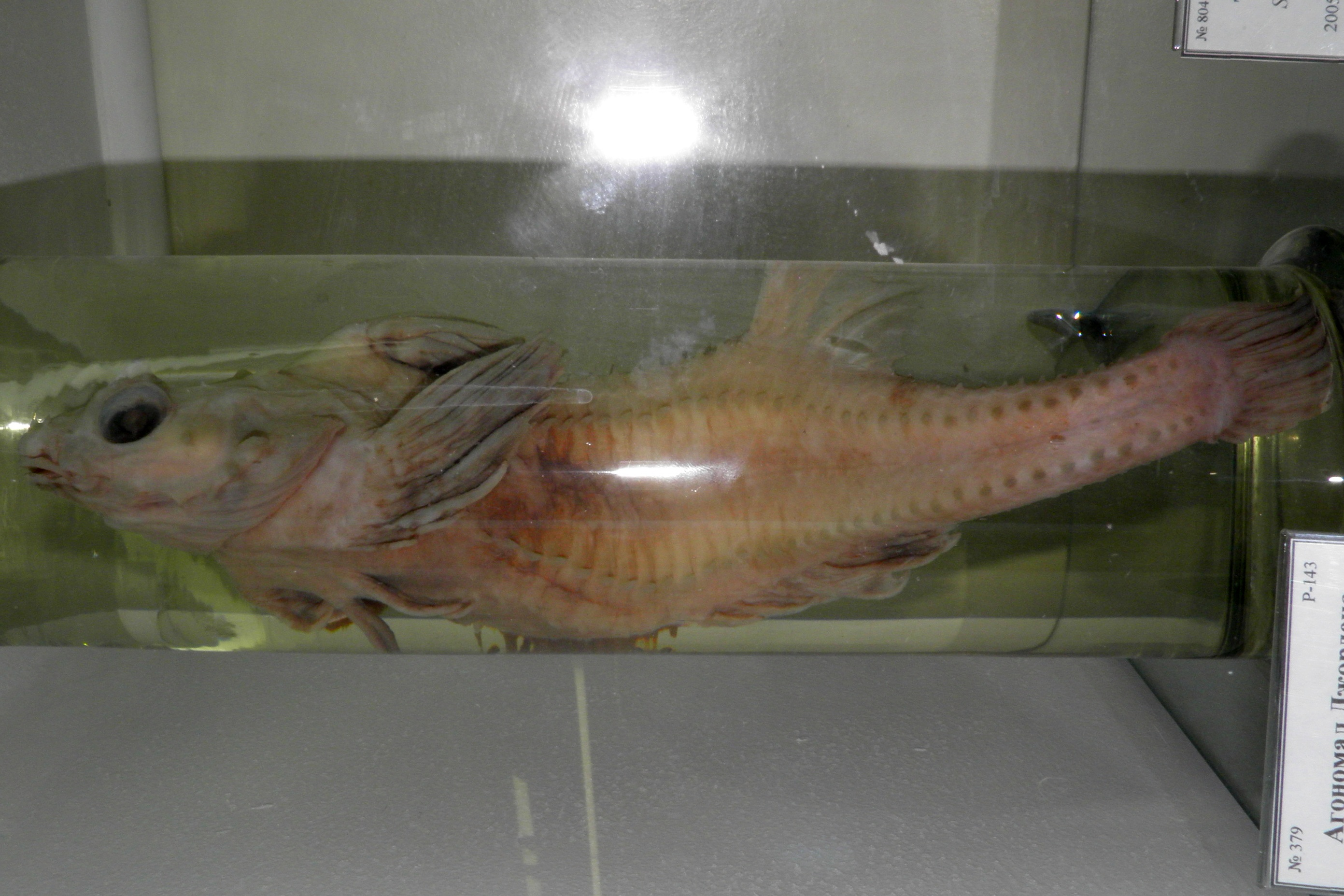

Scientific classification
- Domain: Eukaryota
- Kingdom: Animalia
- Phylum: Chordata
- Class: Actinopterygii
- Order: Perciformes
- Suborder: Cottoidei
- Family: Agonidae
- Genus: Agonomalus
- Species: A. jordani

Binomial name
- Agonomalus jordani Jordan & Starks, 1904

Synonyms
- Hypsagonus jordani (Jordan & Starks, 1904); Agonomalus jordani Schmidt, 1904; Agonomalus severus Gratzianov, 1907; Agonomalus brashnikowi Pavlenko, 1910

= Agonomalus jordani =

Species of fish

Agonomalus jordani is a fish in the family Agonidae. It was described by David Starr Jordan and Edwin Chapin Starks in 1904.

It is a marine, temperate water-dwelling fish which is known from the northwestern Pacific Ocean, including Japan, the Sea of Japan, and Sakhalin. It dwells at a depth range of 10 to 105 metres (33 to 344 ft). Males can reach a maximum total length of 18 centimetres (7.1 in), but more commonly reach a TL of 11 centimetres (4.3 in).
