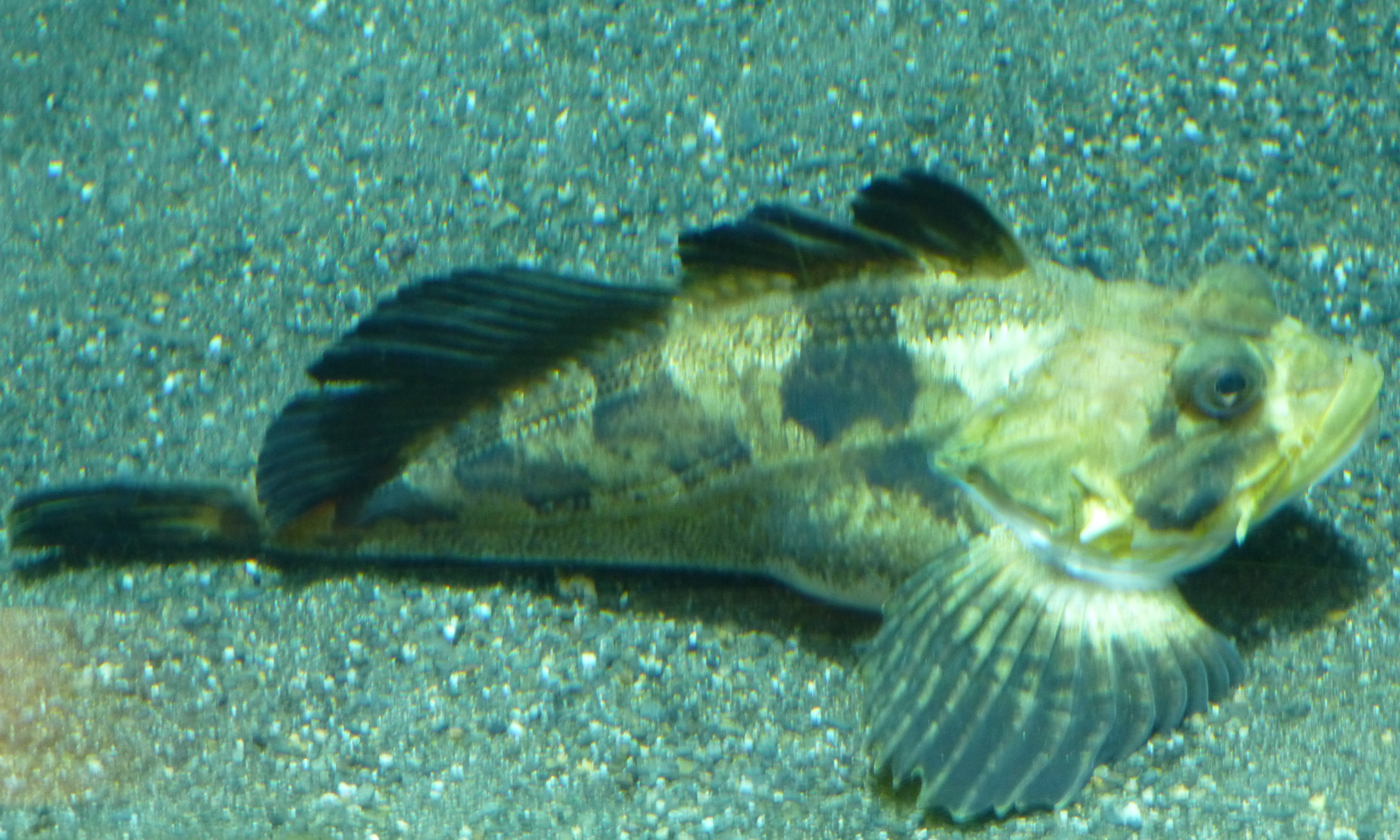
- At Alaska SeaLife Center, Seward, Alaska

Scientific classification
- Kingdom: Animalia
- Phylum: Chordata
- Class: Actinopterygii
- Order: Perciformes
- Suborder: Cottoidei
- Family: Agonidae
- Genus: Hemilepidotus
- Species: H. jordani

Binomial name
- Hemilepidotus jordani Bean, 1881

= Yellow Irish lord =

Species of fish

The yellow Irish lord (Hemilepidotus jordani) is a species of marine ray-finned fish belonging to the family Agonidae It is found in the northern Pacific Ocean.

== Taxonomy ==
The yellow Irish lord was first formally described in 1881 by the American ichthyologist Tarleton Hoffman Bean with its type locality given as Ilyulyuk Unalaska Island in the Aleutian Islands of Alaska. Bean did not identify the identity of the person honored in the specific name but it is most likely to be David Starr Jordan.

== Description ==
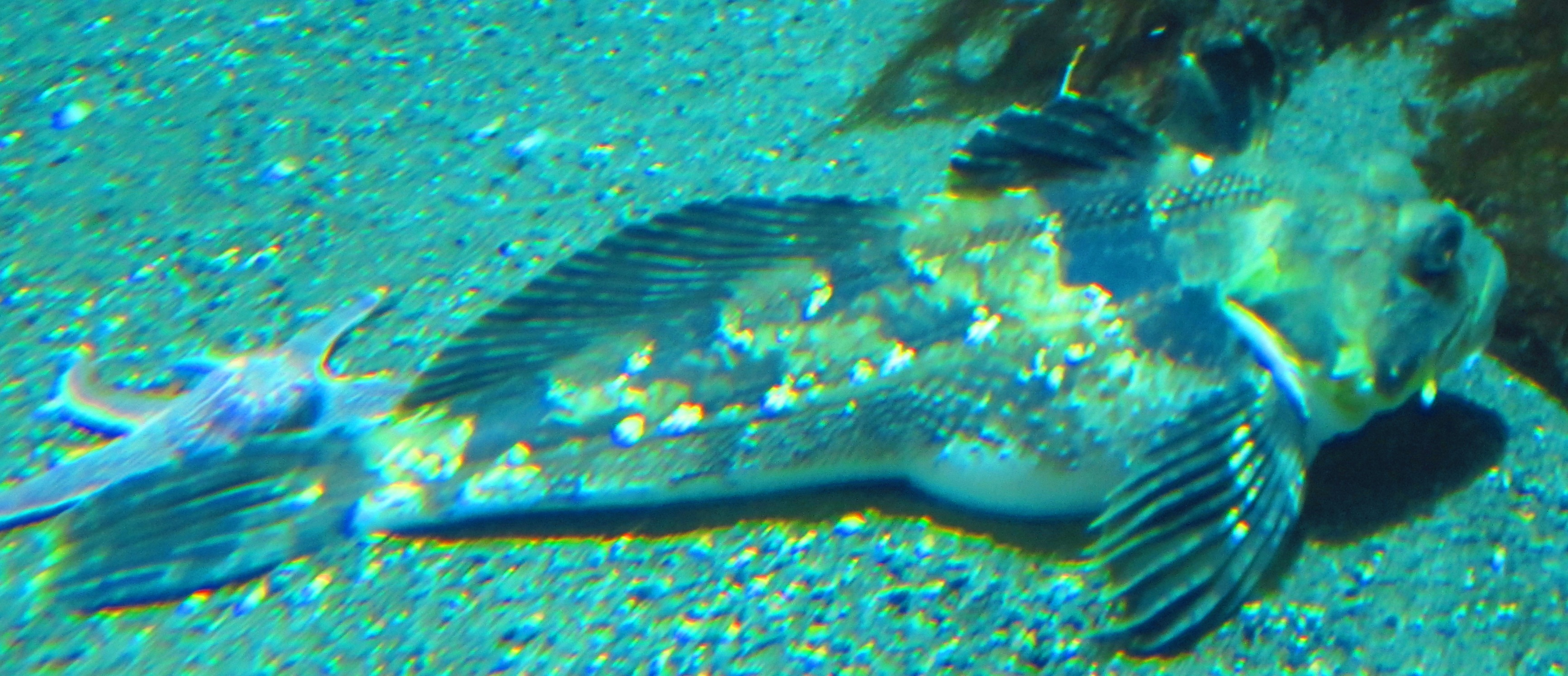
This demersal fish has alternating black and yellow stripes with small white spots laterally

The mature animal is 34–38 cm (13–15 in) in length. Dorsal coloration consists of alternating black and yellow stripes with small white spots laterally. The ventral surface is cream-colored. The fish has 11–12 dorsal spines, 18–23 dorsal soft rays and 35 vertebrae. This species has a maximum published total length of 65 cm (26 in). There is an incision in the first dorsal fin. There are thin cirri on the upper lip.

== Distribution and habitat ==
Hemilepidotus jordani lives in benthopelagic marine environments of the northern Pacific Ocean, between 66°N–54°N, and 154°E–134°W. This corresponds to the northern Kuril Islands and Kamchatka Peninsula to the Gulf of Anadyr and Sitka, Alaska. This bathydemersal fish is found at depths between 257 and 604 m (843 and 1,982 ft).

== Biology ==
The yellow Irish lord has a largely unknown biology. Examination of ovaries of female specimens suggest that these fish spawn once annually during the summer. They are predatory fishes which feed on a wide variety of prey, predominantly crabs, although the largest adults eat other fishes. They live to a reported maximum age of 30 years.
