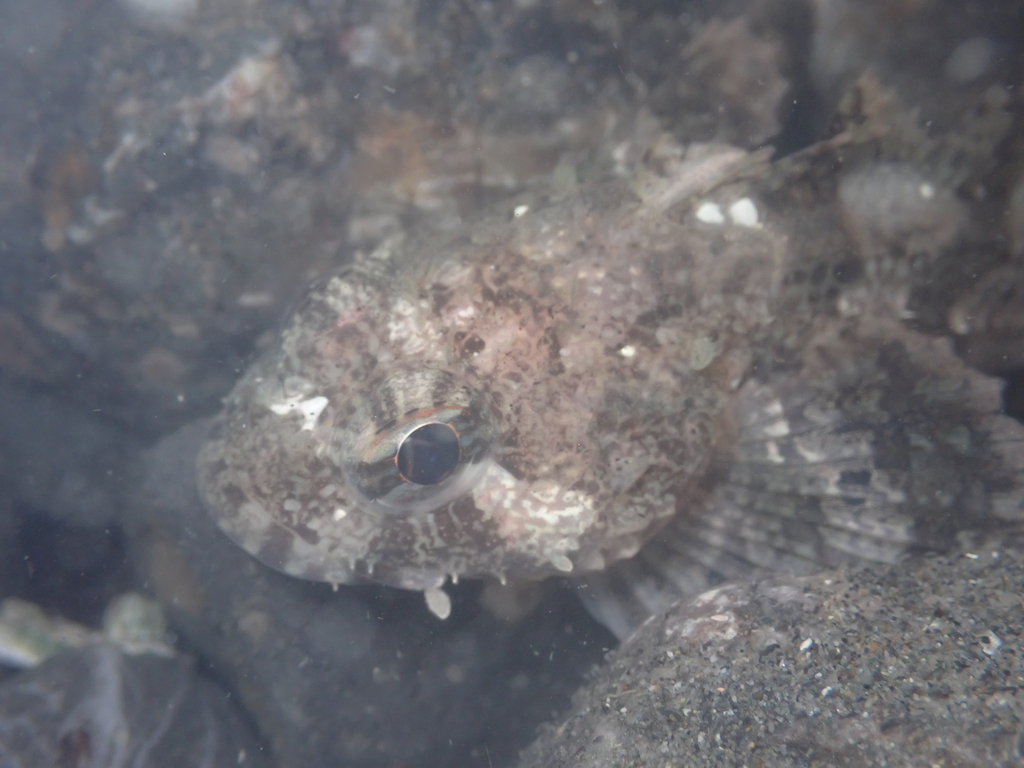

Scientific classification
- Kingdom: Animalia
- Phylum: Chordata
- Class: Actinopterygii
- Order: Perciformes
- Suborder: Cottoidei
- Family: Hemilepidotidae
- Genus: Hemilepidotus
- Species: H. spinosus

Binomial name
- Hemilepidotus spinosus Ayres, 1854

= Brown Irish lord =

Species of fish

The brown Irish lord (Hemilepidotus spinosus) is a species of fish native to the northeastern Pacific Ocean.

American naturalist William Orville Ayres described the brown Irish lord in 1854.

Up to 29 cm long, the brown Irish lord is a mainly brown fish with red-tinged underparts.

The brown Irish lord is native to the eastern Pacific Ocean from the southern coastline of Alaska south to Santa Barbara Island in California. It lives near the sea bottom, at depths of up to 780 m.
