= David Starr Jordan =

American ichthyologist, educator, and eugenicist (1851–1931)

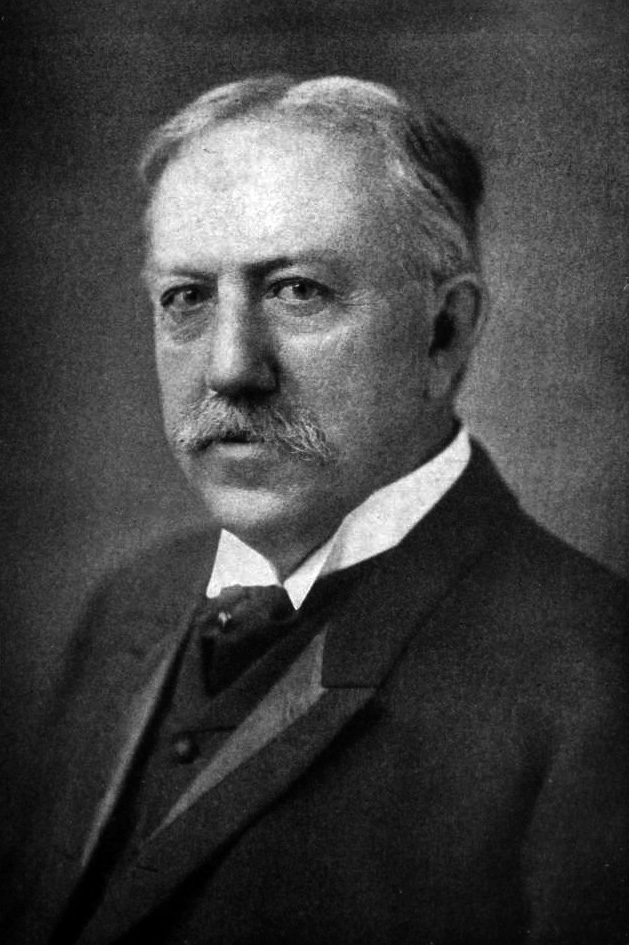

1st Chancellor of Stanford University
- In office 1913 – 1916
- Preceded by: Office established
- Succeeded by: Ray Lyman Wilbur

1st President of Stanford University
- In office 1891 – 1913
- Preceded by: Office established
- Succeeded by: John C. Branner

7th President of Indiana University
- In office 1884 – 1891
- Preceded by: Lemuel Moss
- Succeeded by: John Merle Coulter

Personal details
- Born: January 19, 1851 Wyoming County, New York, U.S.
- Died: September 19, 1931 (aged 80) Stanford, California, U.S.
- Spouses: Susan Bowen (m. 1875; died 1885) Jessie Knight (m. 1887)
- Children: 6, including Edith
- Education: Cornell University (MS); Indiana Medical College (MD)
- Profession: Ichthyologist, University President
- Scientific career
- Fields: Ichthyology
- Workplaces: Butler University; Indiana University; Stanford University
- Academic advisors: Andrew Dickson White
- Doctoral students: Charles Henry Gilbert
- Other notable students: Charles Harvey Bollman; Carl H. Eigenmann; Barton Warren Evermann; Seth Eugene Meek; Oscar Elton Sette; Joseph Swain
- Author abbrev. (zoology): Jordan

David Starr Jordan (January 19, 1851 – September 19, 1931) was an American ichthyologist who served as the founding president of Stanford University from 1891 to 1913. He was previously the president of Indiana University from 1885 to 1891.

Jordan was also a strong supporter of eugenics, and his published views expressed a fear of "race-degeneration", asserting that cattle and human beings are "governed by the same laws of selection". He was an antimilitarist since he believed that war killed off the best members of the gene pool, and he initially opposed American involvement in World War I.

== Early life and education ==
Jordan was born in Gainesville, New York, and grew up on a farm in upstate New York. His parents made an unorthodox decision to educate him at a local girls' high school. His middle name, Starr, does not appear in early census records, and was apparently self-selected; he had begun using it by the time that he was enrolled at Cornell. He said that it was in honour of his mother's devotion to the minister Thomas Starr King but also due to his admiration for the night sky which he expressed at a young age.

He was inspired by his teacher Louis Agassiz to pursue his studies in ichthyology. In the mid-19th century Agassiz was incomparably influential and trained "nearly all" of the leading naturalists in the United States. Simultaneously, according to historian Donald Yacovone, "His revulsion for African Americans and his insistence on their inherent inferiority knew no limits. The influence of [Agassiz's] damaging ideas cannot be overestimated." Jordan was part of the first freshman class of undergraduates at Cornell University, where he graduated in 1872 with a master's degree in botany.

In his autobiography, The Days of a Man, he wrote, "During the three years which followed [my entrance as a 'belated' freshman in March 1869], I completed all the requirements for a degree of Bachelor of Science, besides about two year of advanced work in Botany. Taking this last into consideration, the faculty conferred on me at graduation in June 1872, the advanced degree of Master of Science instead of the conventional Bachelor's Degree ... it was afterward voted not to grant any second degree within a year after the Bachelor had been received. I was placed, quite innocently, in the position of being the only graduate of Cornell to merge two degrees into one." His master's thesis was on the topic "The Wild Flowers of Wyoming County".

Jordan initially taught natural history courses at several small Midwestern colleges and secondary schools, including at Indianapolis High School.

In 1875, while in Indianapolis, Jordan obtained a Doctor of Medicine degree from Indiana Medical College. The Indiana Medical College in Indianapolis opened in 1869, but merged out of existence in 1878. Standards at the college were not particularly high. Jordan himself, reflecting on the experience noted that "I was also able to spend some time in the Medical College, from which, in the spring of 1875, I received the (scarcely earned) degree of Doctor of Medicine, though it had not at all been my intention to enter that profession." The following year, in 1876, Jordan taught comparative anatomy at the college.

Jordan also held an honorary PhD, awarded to him by Butler University in 1877.

== Career ==
In 1879, Jordan was accepted into the natural history faculty of Indiana University Bloomington, where he served as a professor of zoology. His teaching included his version of eugenics, which "sought to prevent the decay of the Anglo-Saxon/Nordic race by limiting racial mixing and by preventing the reproduction of those he deemed unfit."

=== Indiana University president ===
In January 1885, Jordan began his tenure as president of Indiana University and became the nation's youngest university president at only 34 and the first Indiana University president who was not an ordained minister.

He improved the university's finances and public image, doubled its enrollment, and instituted an elective system; like Cornell's, it was an early application of the modern liberal arts curriculum.

It was through studying blind cave fish that the Indiana zoologist David Starr Jordan rose to prominence. A scientist of great charisma, he would lead IU before being chosen in 1891 as the first president of Stanford University. By my time at IU, however, Jordan was locally best known for quipping that every time he learned the name of a student he forgot the name of a fish.

=== Stanford University president ===
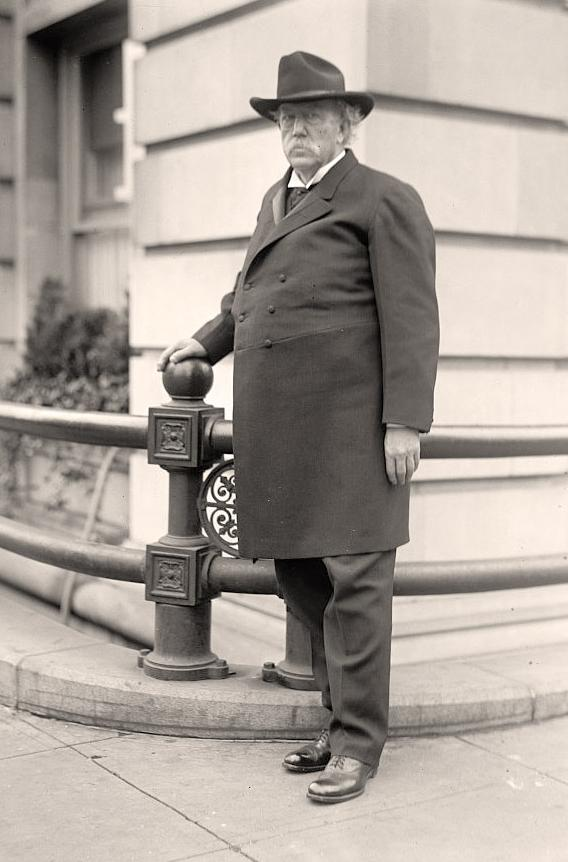
Jordan as president of Stanford University in 1913

In March 1891, he was approached by Leland and Jane Stanford, who offered him the presidency of Leland Stanford Junior University, which was about to open in California. Andrew Dickson White, the co-founder and first president of Cornell University, who offered him the position, recommended Jordan to the Stanfords based on an educational philosophy fit with the Stanfords' vision of a nonsectarian co-educational school with a liberal arts curriculum. Jordan quickly accepted the offer, arrived at Stanford in June 1891, and immediately set about recruiting faculty for the university's planned September opening. Pressed for time, he drew heavily on his own acquaintances; most of the 15 founding professors came either from Cornell or Indiana University. That first year at Stanford, Jordan was instrumental in establishing the university's Hopkins Marine Station. He served Stanford as president until 1913 and then chancellor until his retirement in 1916. The university decided not to renew his three-year-term as chancellor in 1916. As the years went on, Jordan became increasingly alienated from the university.

While he was chancellor, he was elected president of the National Education Association. Jordan was a member in the Bohemian Club and the University Club in San Francisco. Jordan served as a director of the Sierra Club from 1892 to 1903. He was elected to the American Philosophical Society in 1905.

==== David Starr Jordan House ====
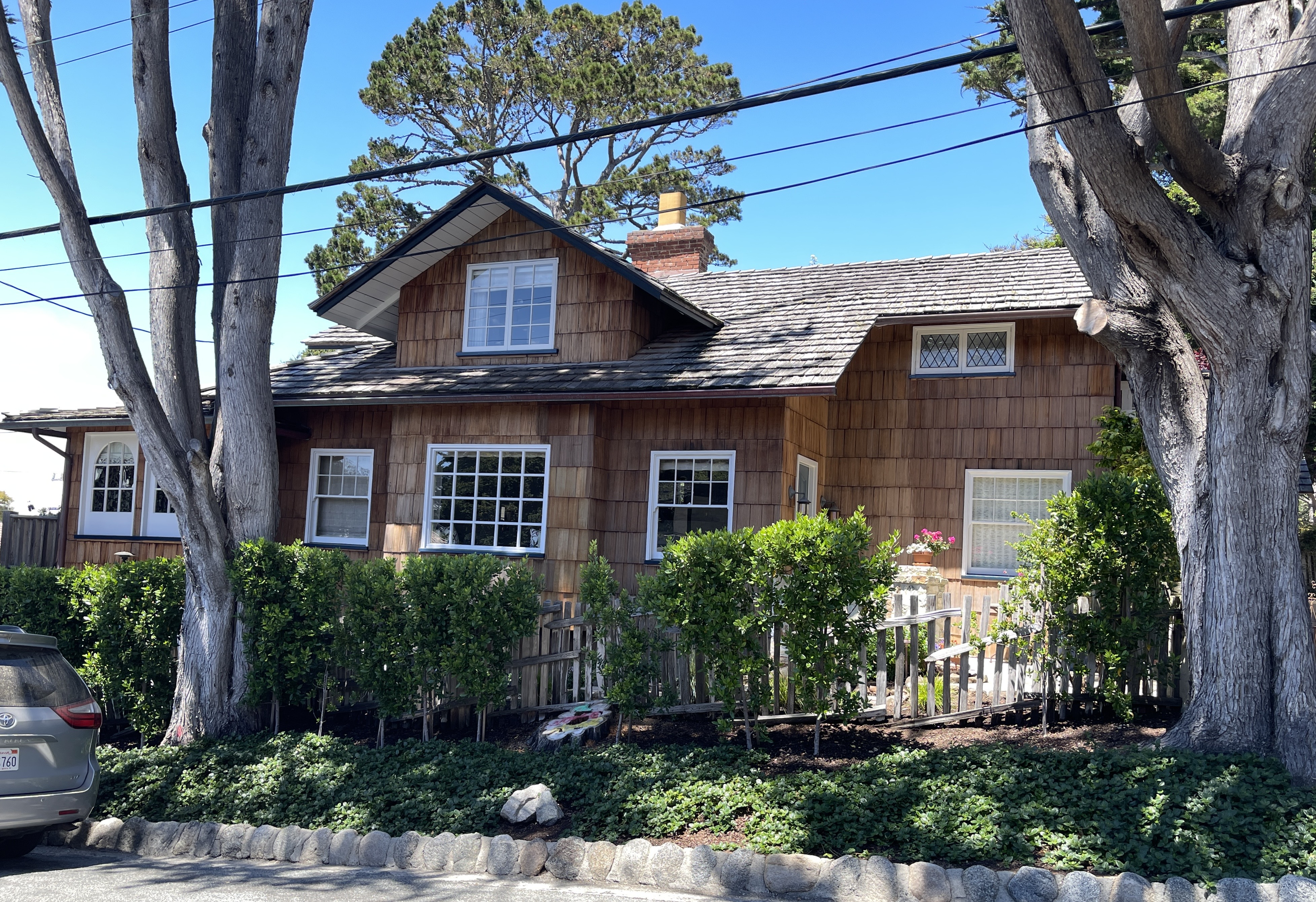
David Starr Jordan House in Carmel-by-the-Sea, California

In 1905, he was one of the first professors to build a summer home at the northeast corner of Camino Real and 7th Avenue, on what became known as "Professors' Row" in Carmel-by-the-Sea, California. He was good friends with Stanford University professor of entomology Vernon Lyman Kellogg, who also lived in Carmel.

=== Racial views and support for eugenics ===
In 1899, Jordan delivered an essay at Stanford on behalf of racial segregation and racial purity. In the essay, Jordan argued that "...a race of men or a herd of cattle are governed by the same laws of selection." Jordan expressed concern about "race degeneration" that would occur unless efforts were made to maintain "racial unity".

==== Eugenics-based argument against war ====
Jordan argued that peace was preferable to warfare because war removed the strongest men from the gene pool. He said, "Future war is impossible because the nations cannot afford it." As one commentator put it, "Though he found meager evidence to support his preconceptions, he still confidently asserted that 'always and everywhere, war means the reversal of natural selection.'"

Jordan was president of the World Peace Foundation from 1910 to 1914 and president of the World Peace Conference in 1915 and initially opposed American entry into World War I although he changed his position in 1917 after he became convinced that a German victory would threaten democracy.

==== "The Blood of the Nation" ====
Soon after it was first delivered, the essay was published by the American Unitarian Association (copyright 1902) under the main title of "The Blood of the Nation" and a subtitle of "A Study of the Decay of Races Through the Survival of the Unfit." Multiple editions of that version followed over the next few years.

An expanded version of the essay was delivered in Philadelphia at the 200th anniversary of Benjamin Franklin's birth in 1906 and printed by the American Philosophical Society. The following year, an expanded version of the original essay with an embossed cover was published by Beacon Press in Boston under the new main title "The Human Harvest" and the same subtitle. This new version was dedicated to Jordan's older brother Rufus, who had volunteered to fight in the American Civil War and, according to Jordan, was part of the "'Human Harvest' of 1862." Jordan's eugenic and anti-war views may have been in part shaped by the death of his brother in 1862 from a 'camp fever,' likely typhoid, immediately after enlisting to fight in the American Civil War.

In 1910, the original and slimmer version of the essay was again published by the American Unitarian Association in a "less expensive form to insure the widest possible distribution."

In 1915, Jordan published an "extended treatise on the same subject" titled War and Breed again through the Beacon Press in Boston. Here Jordan defines and begins to employ the relatively recent term "eugenics" and its opposite "dysgenics".

==== Human Betterment Foundation ====
After Jordan's death, the Human Betterment Foundation, a political eugenics-advocacy organization that advocated for compulsory sterilization legislation in the United States, published a newspaper advertisement claiming Jordan as one of its prominent members. The Foundation published Sterilization for Human Betterment, advocating for legislation that would compel sterilization of the disabled and violent felons, allow for anyone in the public to voluntarily seek medical sterilization, and legalize the use of contraception.

== Role in apparent murder of Jane Stanford ==
In 1905, Jordan launched an apparent coverup of the murder of Stanford University co-founder Jane Stanford. While vacationing in Oahu, Stanford had suddenly died of strychnine poisoning according to the local coroner's jury. Jordan then sailed to Hawaii, hired a physician to investigate the case, and declared she had in fact died of heart failure, a condition whose symptoms bear no relationship to those that were actually observed.

Jordan's motive has been a subject of speculation. One possibility is that he was acting to protect the reputation of the university, as its finances were precarious, and a scandal might have damaged fundraising. He had written the president of Stanford's board of trustees, offered several explanations for Stanford's death, and suggested they select whichever was most suitable. Since Stanford had a difficult relationship with him and reportedly planned to remove him from his position at the university, he might have had a motive to eliminate suspicions about an unsolved crime.

Jordan's version of Stanford's demise was largely accepted until the appearance of several publications in 2003 arguing that she was murdered.

== Retirement ==
In retirement, Jordan remained active, writing on ichthyology, world relations, peace, and his autobiography.

== Lifetime honors and awards ==
- 1877 Honorary Ph.D. awarded by Butler University
- 1886 Honorary LL.D. awarded by Cornell University
- 1902 Honorary LL.D. awarded by Johns Hopkins University
- 1909 Honorary LL.D. awarded by Indiana University

== Skepticism ==
Although a proponent of eugenics, Jordan was skeptical of certain other pseudoscientific claims. He coined the term "sciosophy" to describe the "systematized ignorance" of the pseudoscientist. His later work, The Higher Foolishness, inspired the philosopher Martin Gardner to write his treatise on scientific skepticism, Fads and Fallacies in the Name of Science. However, Gardner noted that "the book is infuriating because although Jordan mentions the titles of dozens of crank works, from which he quotes extensively, he seldom tells you the names of the authors."

== Personal life ==
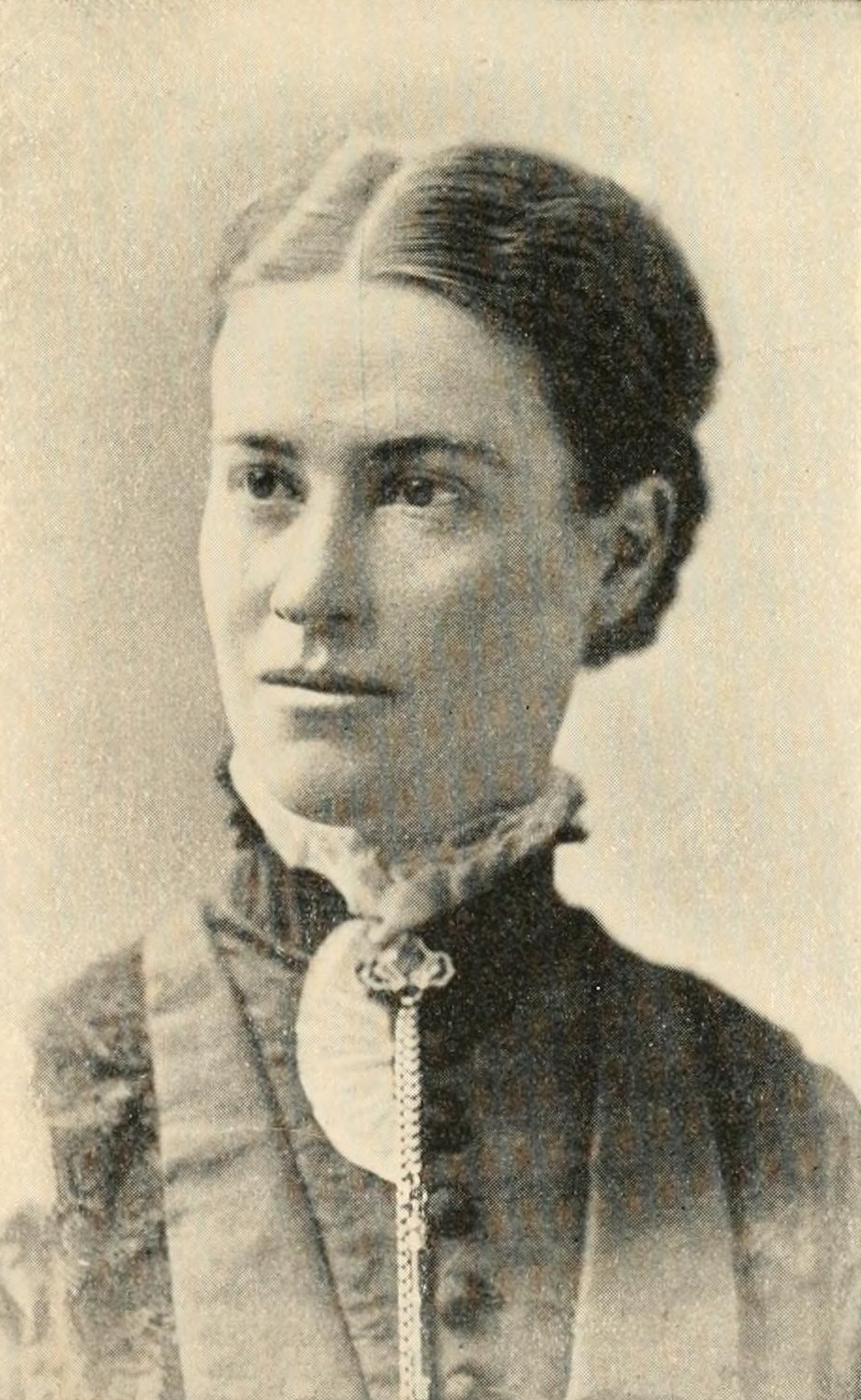
Jordan's wife, Susan Bowen Jordan, in 1879

Jordan married Susan Bowen (1845–1885), a biologist and a graduate of Mount Holyoke College, whom he met at Louis Agassiz's Penikese Island Summer School of Science, in her hometown of Peru, Massachusetts, on March 10, 1875. She died at age 39, after 10 years of marriage, following a brief illness. Bowen was six years Jordan's senior. They had three children: the educator Edith Monica (1877–1965), Harold Bowen (1882–1959), and Thora (1884–1886).

Jordan later married Jessie Knight (1866–1952) in 1887. At the time of their marriage, two years after his first wife's death, Knight was 21 years old and Jordan was 36. They met while he was serving as president of Indiana University. He and his second wife had three children: Knight Starr (1888–1947), Barbara (1891–1900), and Eric Knight (1903–1926).

Two of his daughters, Thora and Barbara, died in childhood. His son Eric died in 1926 at age 22 in a traffic accident near Gilroy, California. Eric had participated in a paleontological expedition to the Revillagigedo Islands and was considering an academic career.

Jordan's papers are housed at Stanford University.

== Death ==
On September 19, 1931, Jordan died at his home on the Stanford University campus after suffering a series of strokes over two years.

== Monuments and memorials ==
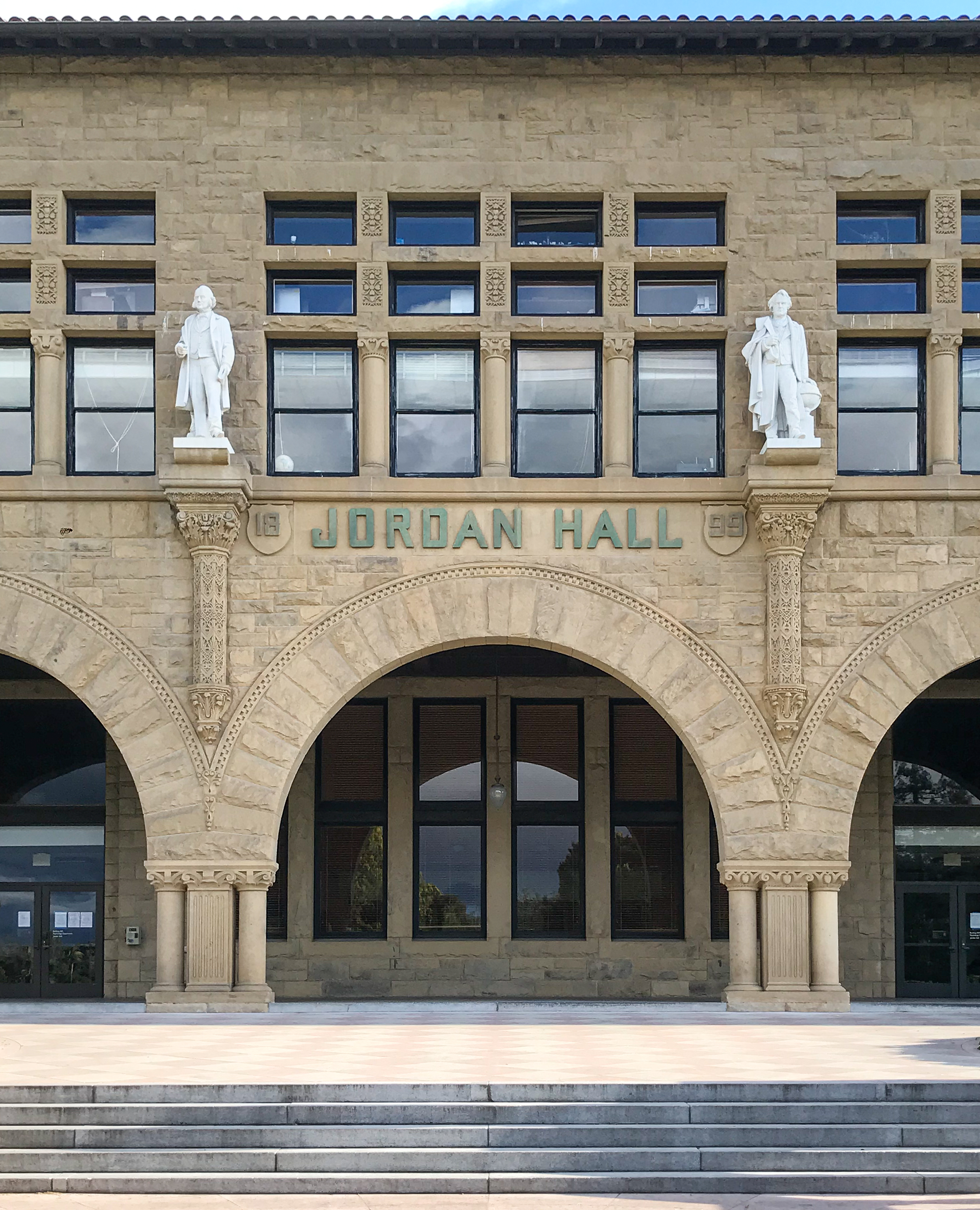
Jordan Hall, now known as Building 420, at Stanford University in May 2020

=== Geographical landmarks ===
- Jordan Lake in the Uinta Mountains in Utah at 40.705°N 110.797°W
- Mount Jordan, a 4,067 m (13,343 ft) mountain peak in Tulare County, California, located on the crest of the Kings-Kern divide of the west slope of the Sierra Nevadas at 36.41°N 118.27°W was named in 1926 in honor of Jordan by the United States Geographic Board at the behest of the Sierra Club. Jordan commented that it was not the first mountain named in his honor since the first such mountain did not retain his name since it already had a name.

In July 2020, the president of the Sierra Club denounced Jordan and its other early leaders for being "vocal advocates for white supremacy and its pseudo-scientific arm, eugenics." The president also announced, "We will also spend the next year studying our history and determining which of our monuments need to be renamed or pulled down entirely." It is not yet clear how their reassessment would affect the status of Mount Jordan, which the club had helped to name in 1926, or that of other geographic features that bear Jordan's name.

=== Namesake Tree ===
The David Starr Jordan "Namesake Tree" at the University of Hawaiʻi at Mānoa Campus Arboretum, an Indian rubber tree, known as Ficus elastica, was given to Jordan at the outset of a trip to Japan, and planted by him on December 11, 1922, now listed as an Exceptional Tree of Hawai‘i.

=== Fishery research vessel ===
In 1966, the fisheries research ship David Starr Jordan was commissioned for service with the United States Fish and Wildlife Service's Bureau of Commercial Fisheries. The ship later served in the National Oceanic and Atmospheric Administration fleet as NOAAS David Starr Jordan (R 444) before it was decommissioned in 2010 and sold to a private company, who renamed it the R/V Ocean Starr.

=== Schools named or formerly named for David Starr Jordan ===
During the early 20th century several schools were named after him or in his honor. However, after 2018, most of them were renamed, as his eugenics activities became well known.

- David Starr Jordan High School in Los Angeles, was established in 1923; in 2020 the name was shortened to Jordan High School to remove the reference to him while keeping "Jordan" as a generic legacy name for alumni.
- Jordan High School in Long Beach, California, established in 1934, was still named for him when the school district last explored its possible renaming in mid-2020. Three years later, a Long Beach middle school teacher tried to get the school board to restart the renaming process in October 2023, but nothing resulted from the attempt.
- Jordan Middle School in Palo Alto, California, established in 1937, was renamed in 2018 for African-American memory chip inventor Frank S. Greene.
- David Starr Jordan Middle School in Burbank, California, established in the 1940s, was renamed in 2021 for labor leader and civil rights activist Dolores Huerta.

=== Campus buildings ===
Since Jordan was closely associated with both Indiana University and Stanford University, both schools named buildings and other campus features after him. However, as his reputation became more controversial in the 2020s, they acted to remove Jordan's name from their respective campuses.

==== Stanford University ====
Stanford honored its former president in 1917 by renaming its zoology building, built in 1899, to Jordan Hall. Other campus features were named Jordan Quad, Jordan Modulars, and Jordan Way. In October 2020 the Stanford Board of Trustees voted unanimously, on the recommendation of an advisory committee, to remove Jordan's name from all four facilities. The former Jordan Hall was to be referred to as Building 420 until a permanent name could be selected sometime the following year. Stanford President Marc Tessier-Lavigne was charged to rename Jordan Quad and Jordan Modulars; however, Tessier-Lavigne was not able to accomplish this task before he left Stanford in 2023. The advisory committee also recommended that the renaming of Jordan Way, a street on the medical campus, "may take place during the course of ongoing construction and planning."

==== Indiana University ====
When Indiana University built a new building for its biology department in 1956, the building was named in honor of Jordan, its former president and biology faculty member. In October 2020 the Indiana University Board of Trustees voted overwhelmingly to remove Jordan's name from the biology building as well as a parking garage and a "river" (actually a small creek) that runs through the center of the campus. Jordan's name was stripped from these places immediately after the trustee meeting had concluded, and they were given temporary, generic names to be used until permanent names could be selected the following year. Jordan Hall, the Jordan River and the Jordan Avenue Parking Garage became respectively the Biology Building, the Campus River, and the East Parking Garage. In August 2021, staff members of the Biology Department sent a petition to the new IU President Pamela Whitten urging the university leadership to rename the Biology Building in honor of James P. Holland, an African-American IU alumnus, award-winning former faculty member and endocrinologist who died in 1998.

Indiana President President Michael McRobbie requested the University Naming Committee to work with the city of Bloomington to find a name as a replacement for Jordan Avenue, a thoroughfare that is owned in part by IU and in part by the city. As of October 2020, there were calls in the Bloomington City Council for Jordan Avenue to be renamed. In April 2021, the Mayor of Bloomington created a seven-member task force to investigate possible replacement names for Jordan Avenue. In September 2021, the City of Bloomington Plan Commission announced that it approved the renaming of Jordan Avenue to Eagleson Avenue while IU is in the process of renaming its section of the street to Fuller Lane pending approval by the IU Renaming Committee and IU's board of trustees. The city planned to complete their street renaming by February 2022. Both new street names honor prominent African-American families who moved to Bloomington after being born into slavery. In December 2021, IU's board of trustees reconsidered their decision to rename the university's section of the street as Fuller Lane by adopting Eagleson Avenue as the new name for the university-owned section of Jordan Avenue.

As late as October 2024, the Indiana University South Bend campus had a scholarship named in honor of Jordan that enables its students to study outside of the United States for a short period.

=== Cornell's David Starr Jordan Prize (1986–2020) ===
Starting in 1986, the David Starr Jordan Prize was funded as a joint endowment by Cornell University, Indiana University, and Stanford University. Every three years it was awarded to a young scientist (under 40 years) who made contributions in one of Jordan's interests of evolution, ecology, population or organismal biology. The prize was last awarded in 2015 to Daniel Bolnick, a professor of integrative biology at the University of Texas at Austin.

As Jordan's reputation became more controversial over his support of eugenics, and particularly after the removal of Jordan's name from buildings on the campuses of Stanford and Indiana universities in 2020, there were calls to rename the prize. The prize was officially discontinued in 2020 and the endowment funds were returned to their respective universities.

== Selected works ==
=== Books ===
- — (1876). Manual of the Vertebrates of the Northern United States. Chicago: Jansen, McClurg, & Company. OCLC 1159743845 – via Google Books. (free download)
- —; Brayton, Alembert Winthrop (1877). Contributions to North American Ichthyology. Washington: U.S. Government Printing Office. OCLC 1111892026 – via Google Books. (free download)
- —; Gilbert, Charles Henry (1882). Synopsis of the Fishes of North America. Washington: U.S. Government Printing Office. OCLC 3175005 – via Archive.org.
- — (1885). A Catalogue of the Fishes Known to Inhabit the Waters of North America. Washington: U.S. Government Printing Office. OCLC 903236094 – via Archive.org.
- — (1887). Science Sketches. Chicago: A.C. McClurg & Company. OCLC 1474622241 – via Archive.org.
- — (1888). The Value of Higher Education. Richmond, Indiana: Daily Palladium Book and Job Printing House. OCLC 25109757 – via Google Books. (free download)
- — (1895). The Factors in Organic Evolution. Palo Alto: Stanford University. OCLC 256761270 – via Archive.org.
- —; Starks, Edwin Chapin (1895). The Fishes of Puget Sound. Palo Alto: Stanford University. OCLC 4855490 – via Archive.org.
- — (1895). The Fishes of Sinaloa. Palo Alto: Stanford University. OCLC 1895321 – via Google Books. (free download)
- — (1895). The Story of the Innumerable Company. San Francisco: Whitaker & Ray Company. OCLC 1315926129 – via HathiTrust.
- — (1896). The Care and Culture of Men: A Series of Addresses on the Higher Education. San Francisco: The Whitaker & Ray Company. OCLC 1041603588 – via Google Books. (free download)
- —; Evermann, Barton Warren (1896–1900). The Fishes of North and Middle America [four vols.]. Washington, DC: Government Printing Office. OCLC 1052833 – via Google Books. (free download)
- — (1897). Matka and Kotik. San Francisco: The Whitaker & Ray Company. OCLC 3410700 – via Archive.org.
- — (1898). The Fur Seals and Fur-Seal Islands of the North Pacific Ocean. Document / Treasury Department; no. 2017. Washington, DC: Government Printing Office. OCLC 715732228 – via HathiTrust.
- — (1898). Footnotes to Evolution. D. Appleton & Company. OCLC 7391851152 – via Google Books. (free download)
- — (1899). The Book of Knight and Barbara. New York: D. Appleton & Company. OCLC 645108937 – via Archive.org.
- — (1907) [1899]. California and the Californians. San Francisco: A. M. Robertson. OCLC 213790638 – via Archive.org.
- — (1898). Imperial democracy. Boston: Women's Education & Industrial Union. OCLC 1189741706 – via Google Books. (free download)
- — (1899). The Question of the Philippines. San Francisco: The Hicks Judd Company. OCLC 11953910 – via Google Books. (free download)
- —; Stallard, Joshua Harrison (1899). The True Basis of Economics. New York: Doubleday & McClure Company. OCLC 654817964 – via Archive.org.
- —; Kellogg, Vernon Lyman (1900). Animal Life: A First Book of Zoology. New York: D. Appleton & Company. OCLC 551301475 – via Archive.org.
- — (1900). The Strength of Being Morally Clean. Boston: H.M. Caldwell Company. OCLC 697581156 – via Archive.org.
- —; Evermann, Barton Warren (1902). American Food and Game Fishes. New York: Doubleday, Page & Company. OCLC 756419416 – via Archive.org.
- —; Heath, Harold (1902). Animal Forms: A Text-Book of Zoology. New York: D. Appleton & Company. OCLC 701697216 – via Google Books. (free download)
- — (1902). The Blood of the Nation (1910, expanded ed.). Boston: American Unitarian Association. OCLC 867059830 – via Google Books. (free download)
- — (1902). The Philosophy of Despair. San Francisco: Paul Elder & Morgan Shepard. OCLC 1126018479 – via Archive.org.
- —; Kellogg, Vernon Lyman; Heath, Harold (1903). Animal Studies. New York: D. Appleton & Company. OCLC 894291265 – via Archive.org.
- — (1903). The Training of a Physician. New York: D. Appleton & Company. OCLC 22219937 – via Google Books.
- — (1903). The Voice of the Scholar. San Francisco: Paul Elder & Company. OCLC 1943092 – via HathiTrust.
- — (1904). The Wandering Host. Boston: American Unitarian Association. OCLC 656932807 – via HathiTrust.
- —; Evermann, Barton Warren (1905). The Aquatic Resources of the Hawaiian Islands. Washington: U.S. Government Printing Office. OCLC 2545083 – via Google Books. (free download)
- — (1905). A Guide to the Study of Fishes. New York: Henry Holt & company. OCLC 720618 – via Archive.org.
- —; Thompson, Joseph Cheesman (1905). The Fish Fauna of the Tortugas Archipelago. Washington: U.S. Government Printing Office. OCLC 1839009 – via Google Books. (free download)
- —; Seale, Alvin; Safford, William Edwin (1906). The Fishes of Samoa. Glossary of principal words composing native names of Samoan fishes. Washington: U.S. Government Printing Office. OCLC 1833265 – via HathiTrust.
- — (1906). Life's Enthusiasms. Boston: American Unitarian Association. OCLC 613986741 – via Archive.org.
- — (1907). The Alps of King-Kern Divide. San Francisco: A.M. Robertson. OCLC 5135202 – via HathiTrust.
- Jordan, David Starr, ed. (1907). The California Earthquake of 1906. San Francisco: A.M. Robertson. OCLC 2948216 – via HathiTrust.
- — (1907). College and the Man. Boston: American Unitarian Association. OCLC 543318 – via Google Books. (free download)
- —; KelloggVernon Lyman Kellogg, Vernon Lyman (1907). Evolution and Animal Life. New York: D. Appleton & Company. OCLC 499941701 – via HathiTrust.
- — (1907). Fishes. New York: Henry Holt & company. OCLC 1572594 – via Archive.org.
- —; Seale, Alvin (1907). Fishes of the Islands of Luzon and Panay. Washington, DC: Government Printing Office. OCLC 670213177 – via Google Books. (free download)
- — (1907). The Human Harvest: A Study of the Decay of Races Through the Survival of the Unfit. Boston: The Beacon Press. OCLC 15615394 – via Google Books. (An expansion of The Blood of a Nation.) (free download)
- —; Snyder, John Otterbein (1908). Description of Three New Species of Carangoid Fishes from Formosa. Pittsburgh: Carnegie institute. OCLC 610513170 – via Archive.org.
- — (1908). The Fate of Iciodorum. New York: Henry Holt & company. OCLC 271178664 – via Archive.org.
- Holder, Charles Frederick; Jordan, David Starr (1908). Fish Stories: Alleged and Experienced. New York: Henry Holt & company. OCLC 441937918 – via Archive.org.
- — (1908). The Higher Sacrifice. Boston: American Unitarian Association. OCLC 644117415 – via Archive.org.
- —; Kellogg, Vernon Lyman (1908). The Scientific Aspects of Luther Burbank's Work. San Francisco: A.M. Robertson. OCLC 1020023402 – via Google Books. (free download)
- —; Richardson, Robert Earl (1909). A Catalog of the Fishes of Formosa. Pittsburgh: Carnegie institute. OCLC 647586394 – via Archive.org.
- — (1909). The Religion of a Sensible American. Younkers-on-Hudson: World Book Company. OCLC 613217089 – via Google Books. (free download)
- Holder, Charles Frederick; Jordan, David Starr (1909). Fish stories alleged and experienced, with a little history natural and unnatural. New York: Henry Holt & Company. OCLC 441937918 – via Google Books. (free download)
- — (1910). The Call of the Nation: A Plea for Taking Politics Out of Politics. Boston: American Unitarian Association. OCLC 645108940 – via Archive.org.
- —; Richardson, Robert Earl (1910). Check-List of Species of Fishes Known from the Philippine Archipelago. Manila: Bureau of Printing. OCLC 658355323 – via Google Books. (free download)
- — (1910). Leading American Men of Science. New York: Henry Holt & Company. OCLC 300587325 – via Archive.org.
- — (1910). The Woman and the University. San Francisco: Whitaker & Ray-Wiggin Company. OCLC 778021337 – via Google Books. (free download)
- — (1910). Work of the International Fisheries Commission of Great Britain and the United States. Washington, DC: Government Printing Office. OCLC 1125635326 – via Biodiversity Heritage Library.
- — (1911). The Heredity of Richard Roe: A Discussion of the Principles of Eugenics. Boston: American Unitarian Association. OCLC 808257564 – via Google Books. (free download)
- — (1911). The Stability of Truth. Henry Holt & Company. OCLC 828339093 – via Google Books. (free download)
- — (1912). The Practical Education. San Francisco: Whitaker & Ray-Wiggin Co. OCLC 891599628 – via Archive.org.
- — (1912). The Story of a Good Woman: Jane Lathrop Stanford. Boston: American Unitarian Association. OCLC 1481462598 – via Google Books. (free download)
- — (1912). Syllabus of Lectures on International Conciliation. Boston: World Peace Foundation. OCLC 652307347 – via Archive.org.
- — (1912). Unseen Empire. Boston: American Unitarian Association. OCLC 1481462598 – via Archive.org.
- — (1913). America's Conquest of Europe. Boston: American Unitarian Association. OCLC 559511853 – via Archive.org.
- —; Metz, Charles William (1913). A Catalog of the Fishes Known from the Waters of Korea. Pittsburgh: Carnegie Institute. OCLC 610570792 – via Archive.org.
- — (1913). Naval Waste. Boston: World Peace Foundation. OCLC 262829672 – via Archive.org.
- — (1913). War and Waste. Toronto: McClelland, Goodchild & Stewart. OCLC 574211072 – via Archive.org.
- — (1913). What Shall We Say?. Boston: World Peace Foundation. OCLC 869104803 – via Google Books. (free download)
- —; Thompson, William Francis (1914). Record of Fishes Obtained in Japan in 1911. Pittsburgh: Carnegie Institute. OCLC 670095922 – via Archive.org.
- —; Jordan, Harvey Ernest (1914). War's Aftermath. Boston: Houghton Mifflin. OCLC 285150613 – via Google Books. (free download)
- — (1915). The Foundation Ideals of Stanford University. Stanford University. OCLC 21500886 – via Google Books. (free download)
- — (1922) [1915]. War and the Breed: The Relation of War to the Downfall of Nations. Younkers-on-Hudson: World Book Company. OCLC 1019453204 – via Google Books. (free download) A further extended and updated version of earlier works The Blood of a Nation and The Human Harvest.
- — (1916). Ways to Lasting Peace. Indianapolis: Bobbs-Merrill Company. OCLC 826648796 – via Archive.org.
- — (1916). What of Mexico?. New York City: The Mexican-American League. OCLC 16433936 – via Archive.org.
- — (1916). World Peace and the College Man. University of Pennsylvania. OCLC 3637088 – via Google Books. (free download)
- — (1917). The Genera of Fishes. Stanford University. OCLC 1571824 – via Archive.org.
- — (1918). Democracy and World Relations. Younkers-on-Hudson: World Book Company. OCLC 374448 – via Google Books. (free download)
- —; Gilbert, James Zaccheus (1919). Fossil Fishes of Southern California. Stanford University. OCLC 809516850 – via Archive.org.
- —; Hubbs, Carl Leavitt (1919). Studies in Ichthyology. Stanford University. OCLC 825337 – via Archive.org. (free download)
- —; Gilbert, James Zaccheus (1920). Fossil Fishes of Diatom Beds of Lompoc, California. Stanford University. OCLC 681100807 – via Archive.org.
- – (1922). Days of a Man [autobiography in two volumes]
  - — (1922). The Days of a Man: Being Memories of a Naturalist, Teacher, and Minor Prophet of Democracy. Vol. 1 (1851–1899). Younkers-on-Hudson: World Book Company. OCLC 1181355797 – via Google Books. (free download)
  - — (1922). The Days of a Man: Being Memories of a Naturalist, Teacher, and Minor Prophet of Democracy. Vol. 2 (1900–1921). Younkers-on-Hudson: World Book Company. OCLC 1181408196 – via Google Books. (free download)
- —; Jordan, Eric Knight (1922). A List of the Fishes of Hawaii: With notes and descriptions of new species. Pittsburgh: Memoirs of the Carnegie Museum. OCLC 964874266 – via Archive.org.
- — (1927). The Higher Foolishness, with Hints as to the Care & Culture of Aristocracy. Indianapolis: Bobbs-Merrill Company. hdl:2027/mdp.39015005107092. OCLC 2572248 – via HathiTrust.
- —; Kimball, Sarah Louise (1929). Your Family Tree. New York: D. Appleton & Company. OCLC 479729 – via Google Books. (free download)

=== Selected articles ===
- — (1893). "The Educational Ideas of Leland Stanford". Educational Review. 6: 136–143 – via HathiTrust.
- — (1902). "Certain Problems of Democracy in Hawaii". Out West. 16: 25, 239.
- — (1905). "The origin of species through isolation". Science. 22 (566): 545–562. Bibcode:1905Sci....22..545S. doi:10.1126/science.22.566.545. PMID 17832412.
- — (1906). "The Trout and Salmon of the Pacific Coast". The Pacific Monthly. 15: 379–389 – via Archive.org.
- —; Clark, George A. (1906). "Pelagic Sealing and the Fur Seal Herd". The Pacific Monthly. 15 (6): 517–522 – via Archive.org.
- — (1906). "Stanford University and the Earthquake of April 18, 1906". The Pacific Monthly. 15 (6): 635–646.
- — (1907). "The Present Status of Darwinism". The Dial. 43 (July/December): 161–163 – via Archive.org.
- — (1913). "The Interlocking Directorates of War". The World's Work. 26: 277–279 – via Archive.org.

=== Miscellany ===
- — (1893). "Temperature and Vertebræ: A Study in Evolution". The Wilder Quarter-Century Book. Ithaca, N.Y.: Comstock Publishing, Co. – via Archive.org.
- — (1912). "Foreword". In Baron d'Estournelles de Constant (ed.). Woman in the United States. San Francisco, Cal.: A.M. Robertson – via Archive.org.
- — (1912). "Relations of Japan and the United States". Japan and Japanese-American Relations. New York: G.E. Stechert and Company – via Archive.org.

== Eponymy ==
Numerous genera and species bear the name Jordan.

Genera: Jordania Starks, 1895, Davidijordania Popov, 1931, and Jordanella Goode & Bean, 1879

Species:

- Agonomalus jordani Jordan & Starks, 1904.
- Agonomalus jordani Schmidt, 1904.
- Allocareproctus jordani (Burke, 1930).
- Astyanax jordani (Hubbs & Innes, 1936).
- Coelorinchus jordani Smith & Pope, 1906.
- Caulophryne jordani Goode & Bean, 1896.
- Chimaera jordani Tanaka, 1905.
- Charal, Chirostoma jordani Woolman, 1894.
- Jordan's tuskfish, Choerodon jordani (Snyder, 1908).
- Flame wrasse, Cirrhilabrus jordani Snyder, 1904.
- Smooth lumpfish, Cyclopteropsis jordani Soldatov, 1929.
- Diplacanthopoma jordani Garman, 1899.
- Dusisiren jordani (Kellogg, 1925).
- Mimic triplefin, Enneanectes jordani (Evermann & Marsh, 1899).
- Petrale sole, Eopsetta jordani (Lockington, 1879).
- Greenbreast darter, Etheostoma jordani Gilbert, 1891.
- Gadella jordani (J. E. Böhlke & Mead, 1951).
- Yellow Irish lord, Hemilepidotus jordani Bean, 1881.
- Brokenline lanternfish, Lampanyctus jordani Gilbert, 1913.
- Legionella jordanis
- Jordan's snapper, Lutjanus jordani (Gilbert, 1898).
- Shortjaw eelpout, Lycenchelys jordani (Evermann & Goldsborough, 1907).
- Malthopsis jordani Gilbert, 1905.
- Gulf grouper, Mycteroperca jordani (Jenkins & Evermann, 1889).
- Neosalanx jordani Wakiya & Takahashi, 1937.
- Patagonotothen jordani (Thompson, 1916).
- Ptychidio jordani Myers, 1930.
- Northern ronquil, Ronquilus jordani (Gilbert, 1889).
- Shortbelly rockfish, Sebastes jordani (Gilbert, 1896).
- Jordan's damsel, Teixeirichthys jordani (Rutter, 1897).
- Jordan's sculpin, Triglops jordani (Schmidt, 1903).

== Taxa described by him ==
- See Category:Taxa named by David Starr Jordan

Academic offices
| Preceded by Lemuel Moss | 7th President of Indiana University; 1884–1891 | Succeeded by John Merle Coulter |
| New office | 1st President of Stanford University; 1891–1913 | Succeeded by John C. Branner |
| New office | 1st Chancellor of Stanford University; 1913–1916 | Vacant Title next held by Ray Lyman Wilbur |
