= James Wilder Orr =

American ichthyologist (born 1958)

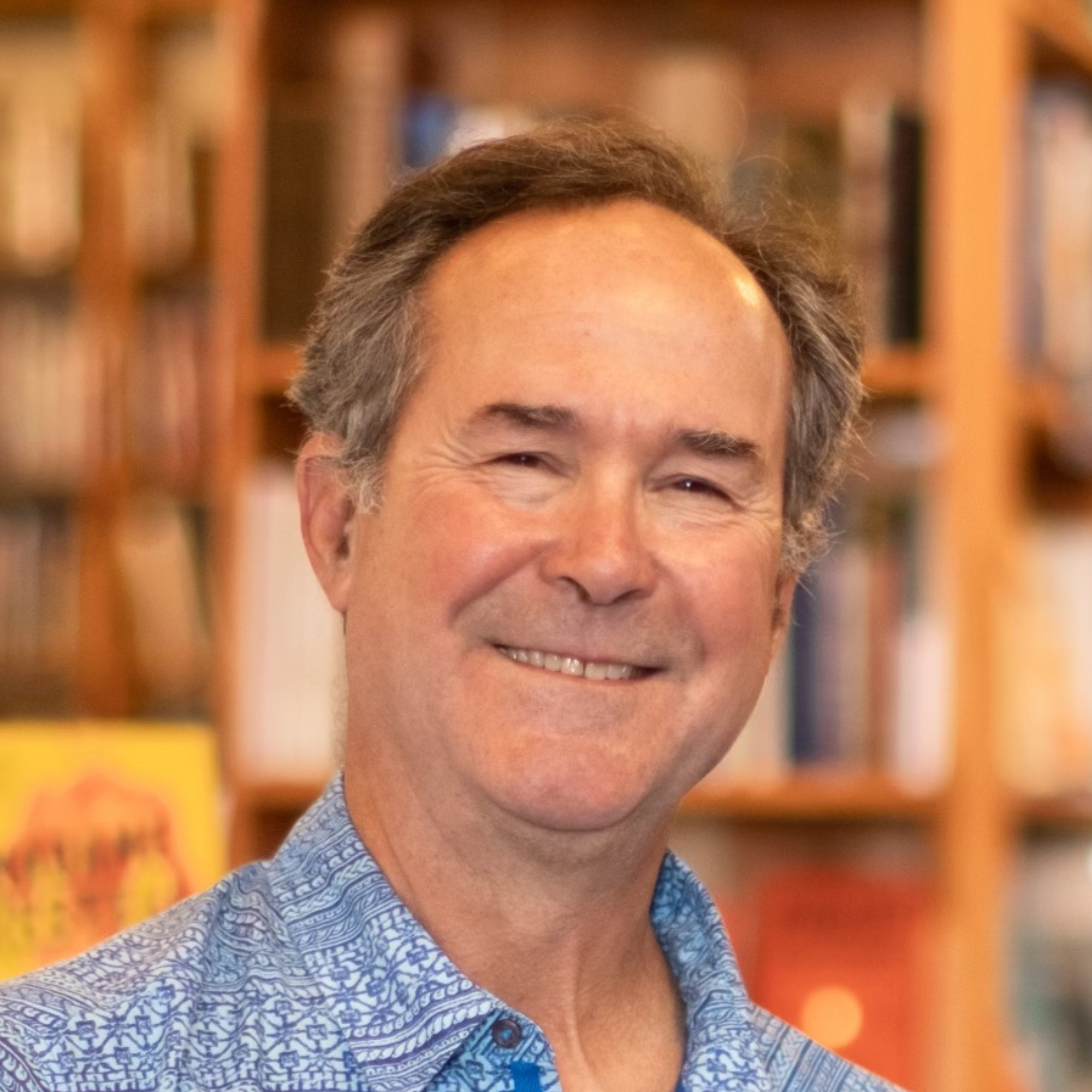
- James Wilder Orr, 2023
- Born: July 19, 1958 (age 68); Huntington, New York
- Education: Wheaton College (BS), Auburn University (MS), University of Washington (PhD)
- Awards: NOAA Distinguished Career Award
- Scientific career
- Fields: fisheries biology, ichthyology
- Workplaces: Alaska Fisheries Science Center, University of Washington, Burke Museum of Natural History and Culture
- Academic advisors: John S. Ramsey, Theodore W. Pietsch

James Wilder Orr (born Huntington, New York, July 19, 1958) is an American fisheries biologist, ichthyologist, and systematist best known for his studies of skates, rockfishes, snailfishes, and flatfishes. He has described 32 new species and two new genera of fishes, and is the author or co-author of more than 130 scientific and popular articles, including three books. His work has focused primarily on the phylogenetic relationships, zoogeography, reproductive biology, and behavior of marine teleosts, particularly deep-water benthic taxa. He has spent most of his career at the Alaska Fisheries Science Center, National Marine Fisheries Service (NMFS), in Seattle, as a Research Fisheries Biologist. At the same time, he has served as an Affiliate Professor at the School of Aquatic and Fishery Sciences, and Affiliate Curator of Fishes at the Burke Museum of Natural History and Culture, University of Washington, Seattle. For his lifetime of service, Orr was presented with a National Oceanic and Atmospheric Administration (NOAA) Distinguished Career Award in 2022.

== Education ==
Orr graduated from Virgil I. Grissom High School, Huntsville, Alabama (1976), followed by a B.S. in biology at Wheaton College, Wheaton, Illinois (1980); a M.S. in Fisheries Management at Auburn University, Auburn, Alabama (1987); and a Ph.D. in Fisheries at the University of Washington, Seattle (1995).

== Academic contributions ==
Orr's work as a Research Fisheries Biologist for the Alaska Fisheries Science Center, Resource Assessment and Conservation Engineering Division, has focused primarily on the marine biodiversity of the North Pacific Ocean especially the Bering and Chukchi seas and waters off southeast Alaska and the Aleutian Islands. From 1995 to 2013, he participated in NMFS Groundfish surveys, often as Chief Scientist, on the West Coast shelf and slope, Gulf of Alaska shelf, Aleutian Islands, and Bering and Chukchi seas. New taxa discovered and described by Orr (32 species and two genera) reside mostly in the family Liparidae, but also in the families Rajidae, Solenostomidae, Scorpaenidae, Cottidae, Zoarcidae, Ammodytidae, Pleuronectidae, and Oneirodidae. He is widely recognized as an expert on the evolutionary history, distribution, ecology, and behavior of North Pacific fishes in general, but especially the highly species-rich and economically important families Rajidae, Cottidae, Scorpaenidae, and Pleuronectidae.

Perhaps his most significant contributions lie in broad-based generic revisions of various taxa, incorporating morphology as well as molecular and early life-history characters; his Field Guide to Sharks, Skates, and Ratfish of Alaska; "Fishes of the Salish Sea: a compilation and distribution analysis;"Annotated Checklist of the Marine Macroinvertebrates of Alaska; and co-author of the three-volume Fishes of the Salish Sea: Puget Sound and the Straits of Georgia and Juan de Fuca published by the University of Washington Press in 2019. Of great interest also is his study of "Reproductive parasitism between distant phyla: molecular identification of snailfish (Liparidae) egg masses in the gill cavities of king crabs (Lithodidae)" published in 2016.

Orr has also served as Managing Editor of NOAA Technical Reports and NOAA Professional Papers, and as Scientific Editor of Fishery Bulletin. As a Life Member of the American Society of Ichthyologists and Herpetologists, he has served as Index Editor of the Society's journal Ichthyology & Herpetology (formerly Copeia) continuously since 1994. Orr retired at the end of December 2020.

Taxa named in his honor include a new genus and species, Orrichthys longimanus† Carnevale and Pietsch, 2010 (Teleostei: Brachionichthyidae); a new species of snailfish, Careproctus orri Kai and Tashiro, 2021 (Teleostei: Liparidae); and a new species of sponge, Stelodoryx jamesorri Lehnert and Stone, 2020 (Porifera: Poecilosclerida).

== Selected bibliography ==
- 1993. Orr, J. W., and R. A. Fritzsche. Revision of the ghost pipefishes, family Solenostomidae (Teleostei: Syngnathoidei). Copeia, 1993 (1): 168–182.
- 1998. Orr, J. W., M. A. Brown, and D. C. Baker. Guide to rockfishes (Scorpaenidae) of the genera Sebastes, Sebastolobus, and Adelosebastes of the northeast Pacific Ocean. U.S. Department of Commerce, NOAA Technical Memorandum NMFS-AFSC-95, 46 pp.
- 2000. Orr, J. W., and A. C. Matarese. Revision of the genus Lepidopsetta Gill, 1862 (Teleostei: Pleuronectidae) based on larval and adult morphology, with a description of a new species from the North Pacific Ocean and Bering Sea. Fishery Bulletin, 98 (3): 539–582.
- 2001. Orr, J. W., and M. S. Busby. Prognatholiparis ptychomandibularis, a new genus and species of the fish family Liparidae (Teleostei: Scorpaeniformes) from the Aleutian Islands, Alaska. Proceedings of the Biological Society of Washington, 114 (1): 51–57.
- 2002. Orr, J. W., R. A. Fritzsche, and J. E. Randall. Solenostomus halimeda, a new species of ghost pipefish (Teleostei: Gasterosteiformes) from the Indo Pacific, with a revised key to known species of the family Solenostomidae. Aqua, Journal of Ichthyology and Aquatic Biology, 5 (3): 99–108.
- 2004. Orr, J. W. Lopholiparis flerxi, a new genus and species of snailfish (Scorpaeniformes: Liparidae) from the Aleutian Islands, Alaska. Copeia, 2004 (3): 551–555.
- 2004. Orr, J. W., and J. E. Blackburn. The dusky rockfishes (Teleostei: Scorpaeniformes) of the North Pacific Ocean: resurrection of Sebastes variabilis (Pallas, 1814) and a redescription of Sebastes ciliatus (Tilesius, 1813). Fishery Bulletin, 102 (2): 328–348.
- 2006. Orr, J. W., and M. S. Busby. Revision of the snailfish genus Allocareproctus Pitruk and Fedorov (Teleostei: Liparidae), with description of four new species from the Aleutian Islands. Zootaxa, 1173 :1–37.
- 2007. Orr, J. W., and K. P. Maslenikov. Two new variegated snailfishes of the genus Careproctus (Teleostei: Scorpaeniformes: Liparidae) from the Aleutian Islands, Alaska. Copeia, 2007 (3): 699–710.
- 2007. Stevenson, D. E., J. W. Orr, G. R. Hoff, and J. D. McEachran. A field guide to sharks, skates, and ratfish of Alaska. Alaska Sea Grant, Fairbanks, 77 pp.
- 2008. Orr, J. W., and S. Hawkins. Species of the rougheye rockfish complex: resurrection of Sebastes melanostictus (Matsubara, 1934) and a redescription of Sebastes aleutianus (Jordan and Evermann, 1898) (Teleostei: Scorpaeniformes). Fishery Bulletin, 106 (2): 111–134.
- 2011. Orr, J. W., D. E. Stevenson, G. R. Hoff, I. Spies, and J. D. McEachran. Bathyraja panthera, a new species of skate (Rajidae: Arhynchobatinae) from the western Aleutian Islands, and resurrection of the subgenus Arctoraja Ishiyama. NOAA Professional Papers, NMFS 11.
- 2012. Orr, J. W. Two new species of Careproctus (Scorpaeniformes: Liparidae) from the Bering Sea and eastern North Pacific Ocean, with a redescription of Careproctus ovigerus. Copeia, 2012 (2): 257–265.
- 2013. Orr, J. W., D. T. Drumm, R. J. Van Syoc, K. P. Maslenikov, T. W. Pietsch, D. E. Stevenson, and R. R. Lauth. An annotated checklist of the marine macroinvertebrates of Alaska, and an evaluation of identification confidence in RACE groundfish surveys. North Pacific Research Board Final Report, 1016, 1090 pp.
- 2015. Orr, J. W., S. Wildes, Y. Kai, N. Raring, T. Nakabo, O. Katugin, and J. Guyon. Systematics of sand lances of the genus Ammodytes in the North Pacific based on molecular and morphological evidence, with the description of a new species from Japan. Fishery Bulletin, 113 (1): 129–156.
- 2015. Orr, J. W., Y. Kai, and T. Nakabo. Snailfishes of the Careproctus rastrinus complex (Liparidae): redescriptions of seven species in the North Pacific Ocean region, with the description of a new species from the Beaufort Sea. Zootaxa, 4018 (3): 301–348.
- 2019. Pietsch, T. W., and J. W. Orr. Fishes of the Salish Sea: Puget Sound and the Straits of Georgia and Juan de Fuca, illustrated by Joseph R. Tomelleri. University of Washington Press, Seattle, 3 vols., 1,048 pp., 155 color pls.[21][22]
- 2019. Orr, J. W., I. B. Spies, D. E. Stevenson, G. C. Longo, Y. Kai, S. Ghods, and M. Hollowed. Molecular phylogenetics of snailfishes (Cottiformes: Liparidae) based on MtDNA and RADseq genomic analyses, with comments on selected morphological characters. Zootaxa, 4642:1–79.
- 2023. Gardner, J., J. W. Orr, and L. Tornabene. Two new species of snailfishes (Cottiformes: Liparidae) from the Aleutian Islands, Alaska, and a redescription of the closely related Careproctus candidus. Ichthyology & Herpetology, 111 (1): 54–71.
