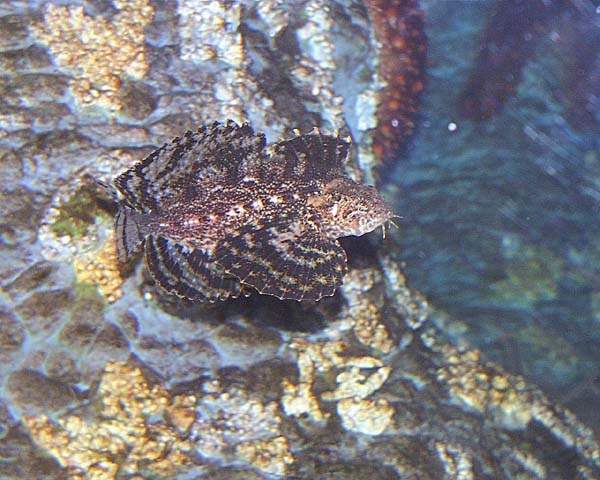

Conservation status
- Least Concern (IUCN 3.1)

Scientific classification
- Kingdom: Animalia
- Phylum: Chordata
- Class: Actinopterygii
- Division: Teleostei
- Order: Perciformes
- Suborder: Cottoidei
- Family: Hemitripteridae
- Genus: Blepsias
- Species: B. bilobus

Binomial name
- Blepsias bilobus Cuvier, 1829

Synonyms
- Histiocottus bilobus (Cuvier, 1829)

= Blepsias bilobus =

Species of fish

Blepsias bilobus, the crested sculpin, is a species of sculpin belonging to the subfamily Hemitripterinae of the family Agonidae. This species is found in the North Pacific Ocean.

== Taxonomy ==
Blepsias bilobus was first formally described in 1829 by the French zoologist Georges Cuvier with the type locality given as Kamchatka. This sculpin is classified in the subfamily Hemitripterinae of the family Agonidae. The specific name bilobus means "two lobed", an allusion to the deeply incised dorsal fin giving the impression of two lobes, Cuvier mistakenly thought that Blepsias cirrhosus had three lobes and gave it the name Blepsias trilobus.

== Description ==
Blepsias bilobus has a deep, compressed body which is covered in papillae which enclose a small spine that is embedded in a bony plate in the skin. There are cirrhi on the chin. The first dorsal fin is smoothly rounded and is not notched. The second dorsal fin and the anal fin are large and are located opposite each other. There are 8 or 9 spines in the dorsal fin and 21 or 22 soft rays while the anal fin has 18 to 20 soft rays. The pectoral fin contains between 15 and 17 rays and the small pelvic fin has 3 soft rays. The caudal fin is rounded. The color is brown to olive-green on the upper body with indistinct blotches on the back, paler ventrally. The fins have dusky blotches except for the dark barred pectoral fin. The maximum published standard length is 25 cm (9.8 in).

== Distribution and habitat ==
Blepsias bilobus is found in the North Pacific Ocean where it distributed from the northern Sea of Japan north to the Bering Sea and along the western coast of North America to northern British Columbia. This is a nearshore, demersal fish found at depths between 0 and 250 m (0 and 820 ft), although it is frequently found clear of the substrate.
