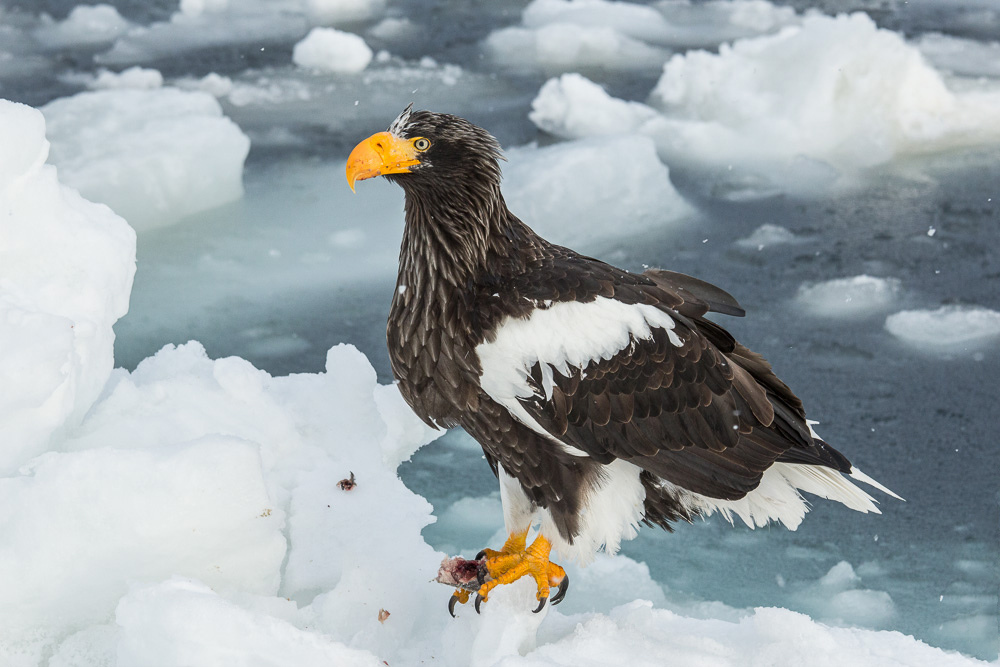
- A Steller's sea eagle near Rausu, Hokkaido, Japan

Conservation status
- Vulnerable (IUCN 3.1)
- CITES Appendix II

Scientific classification
- Kingdom: Animalia
- Phylum: Chordata
- Class: Aves
- Order: Accipitriformes
- Family: Accipitridae
- Genus: Haliaeetus
- Species: H. pelagicus

Binomial name
- Haliaeetus pelagicus (Pallas, 1811)
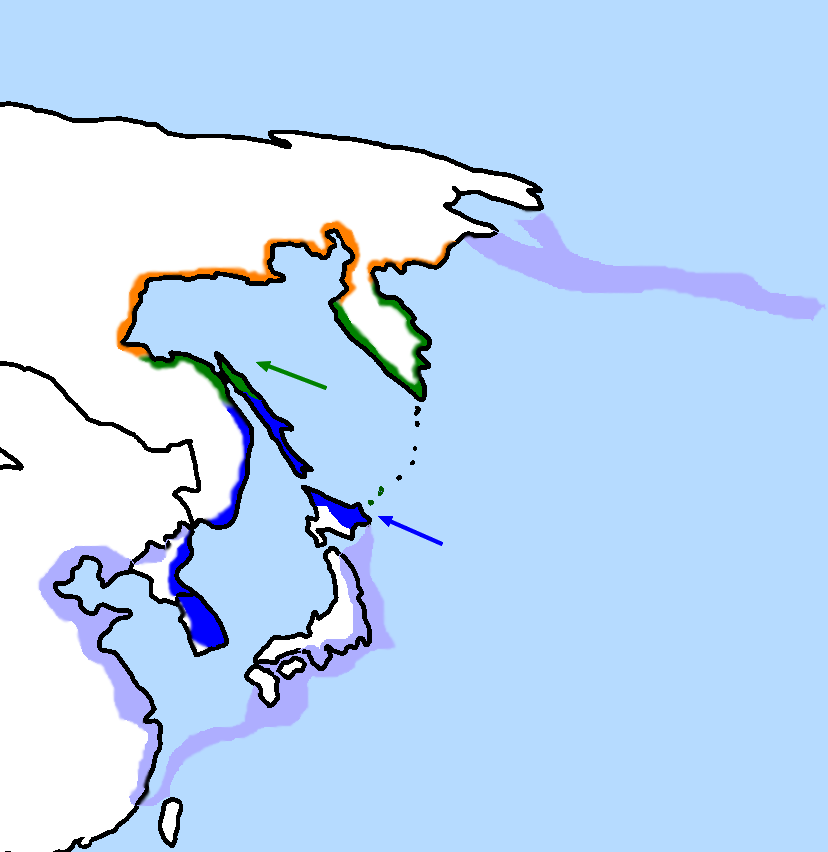
- Breeding Annual resident Winter Visitor Migrant

Synonyms
- Aquila pelagica (Pallas, 1811); Thalassaetus pelagicus (Pallas); Falco leucopterus (Temminck, 1824); Falco imperator (Kittlitz, 1832)

= Steller's sea eagle =

Bird of prey species native to East Asia

Steller's sea eagle (Haliaeetus pelagicus), also known as the Pacific sea eagle or white-shouldered eagle, is a very large diurnal bird of prey in the family Accipitridae. It was described first by Peter Simon Pallas in 1811. No subspecies are recognized. A sturdy eagle, it has dark brown plumage with white wings and tail, a yellow beak, and yellow talons. Typically, it is the heaviest eagle in the world, at about 5 to 10 kg (11 to 22 lb), but in some other standard measurements, may be smaller than the harpy eagle (Harpia harpyja) and the Philippine eagle (Pithecophaga jefferyi). Steller's sea eagle females are bigger than males, as in other raptors.

The Steller's sea eagle is endemic to coastal northeastern Asia, where it lives in Russia, Korea, Japan, and China. It mainly preys on fish and water birds. The Kamchatka Peninsula in Far Eastern Russia is known for its relatively large population of these birds; about 4,000 of these eagles live there. Steller's sea eagle is listed as vulnerable on the International Union for Conservation of Nature's Red List (IUCN Red List) of threatened species.

== Taxonomy ==
This species was described initially as Aquila pelagica by Prussian naturalist Peter Simon Pallas, in 1811. The species name is the Ancient Greek pelagos, "the open sea/ocean". Dutch naturalist Coenraad Jacob Temminck named it Falco leucopterus, "white winged eagle", in 1824, and Heinrich von Kittlitz called it Falco imperator in 1832. George Robert Gray moved the species into the genus Haliaeetus in 1849.

"Steller's sea eagle" has been designated the official name by the International Ornithologists' Union (IOU). It is named after the German naturalist, Georg Wilhelm Steller. It also is known as Steller's fish eagle, Pacific sea eagle, or white-shouldered eagle. In Russian, the eagle has been called beloplechii orlan (white-shouldered sea eagle), or tikhookeanskii orlan (pacific sea eagle). In Japanese, it is called ō-washi (large eagle or great eagle). In Korean, the eagle is called chamsuri (true eagle). In Mandarin, it is called hǔtóu hǎidiāo (tiger-headed sea eagle).

A 1996 analysis of the cytochrome b gene of mitochondrial DNA showed that Steller's sea eagles diverged from a lineage that gave rise to the bald eagle (Haliaeetus leucocephalus) and white-tailed eagle (H. albicilla) around three to four million years ago. All three of these species have yellow eyes, beaks, and talons, unlike their next-closest relative, Pallas's fish eagle (H. leucoryphus).

H. pelagicus is monotypic, although a dubious subspecies has been named; H. p. niger. The latter name was given to the population that lacked white feathers except for the tail, and may have resided all year in Korea. Last seen in 1968 and long believed to be extinct, a female matching H. p. niger in appearance was hatched in captivity in the Bayerischen Jagdfalkenhof (Germany) in 2001 and subsequently transferred to Tierpark Berlin. Both her parents had typical coloration, indicating that H. p. niger is an extremely rare dark morph rather than a valid subspecies, as had been suggested earlier. One of the offspring of the dark Berlin female, a male hatched in 2014 that now lives in Skandinavisk Dyrepark (Denmark), also is a dark morph.

== Description ==
=== Size ===
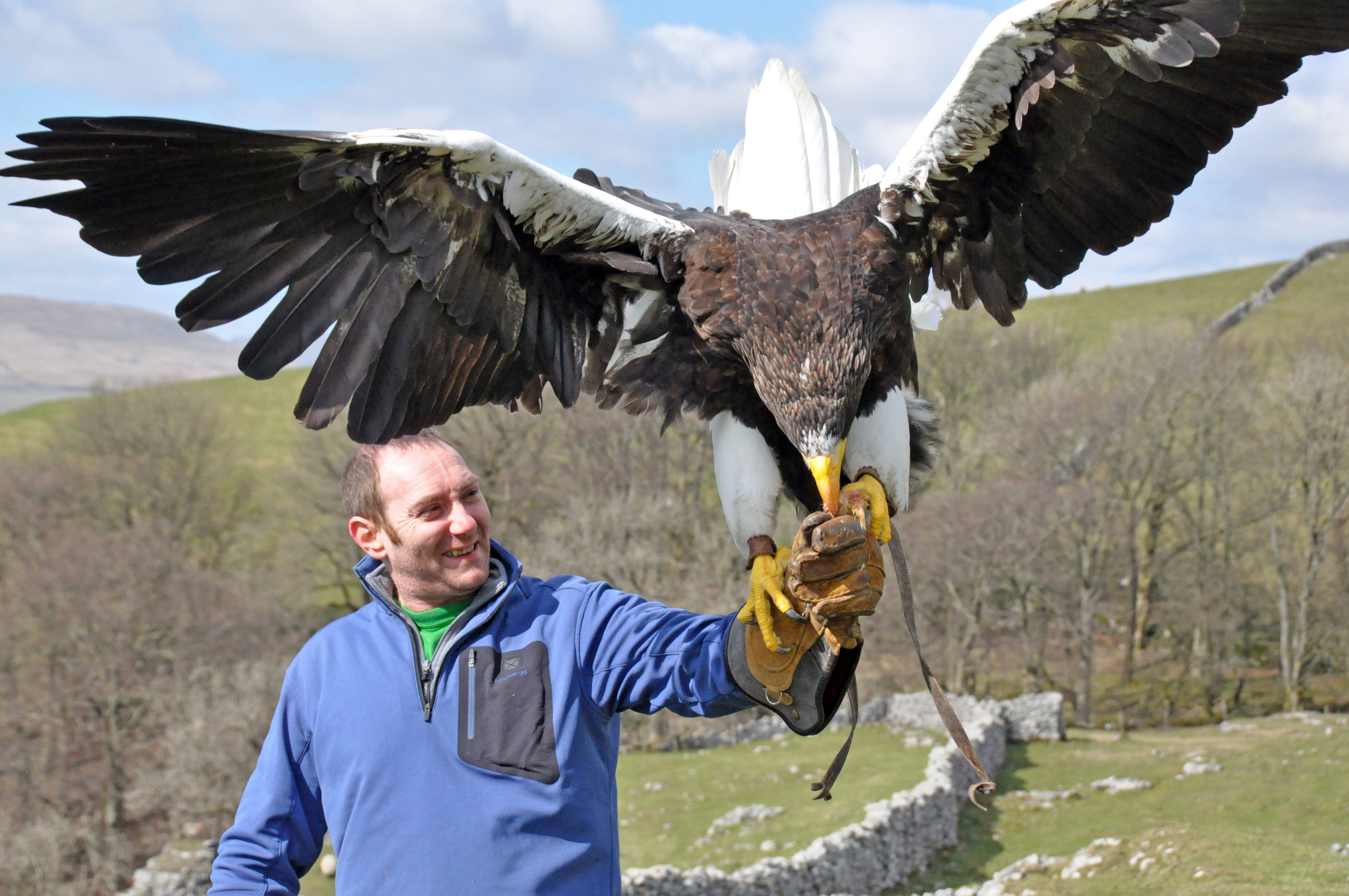
A falconer holding a Steller's sea eagle in England

Steller's sea eagle is the largest bird in the genus Haliaeetus and is one of the largest raptors overall. Females vary in weight from 6.2 to 9.5 kg (14 to 21 lb), while males are rather lighter with a weight range of 4.9 to 6.8 kg (11 to 15 lb). The typical weight is variable, possibly due to seasonal variation in food access or general condition of eagles, but has been reported as high as a mean weight of 7.75 kg (17.1 lb) to a median estimate weight of 6.25 kg (13.8 lb), excluding expired eagles that were poisoned by lead and endured precipitous weight loss by the occasion of their deaths.

At its average weight, the Steller's seems to outweigh the average harpy by around 0.5 kg (1.1 lb) and the average Philippine eagles by more than 1 kg (2.2 lb). Steller's sea eagle can range in total length from 85 to 105 cm (2 ft 9 in to 3 ft 5 in). Apparently, males average about 89 cm (2 ft 11 in) in length, while females average about 100 cm (3 ft 3 in), marginally shorter on average than the harpy eagle and about 65 mm (2.6 in) shorter than the Philippine eagle.

The wingspan is from 1.95 to 2.50 m (6 ft 5 in to 8 ft 2 in) and the wing chord measurement is 560 to 680 mm (22 to 27 in). The sea eagle's wingspan is one of the largest of any living eagle, at a median of 2.13 m (7 ft 0 in) per Ferguson-Lees (2001) or a median of 2.2 m (7 ft 3 in) per Saito (2009). Steller's sea eagles' absolute maximum wingspan is less certain; many sources place it at up to 2.45 m (8 ft 0 in). However, less substantiated records indicate that it may also reach even greater wingspans. Three separate sources claim unverified Steller's sea eagles spanning up to 2.7 m (8 ft 10 in), 2.74 m (9 ft 0 in), and 2.8 m (9 ft 2 in), respectively. If true, this would be the largest wingspan of any eagle.

Steller's sea eagle is unique among all sea eagles in having a yellow beak even in juvenile birds, and possessing 14, not 12, rectrices.

=== Standard measurements and physiology ===
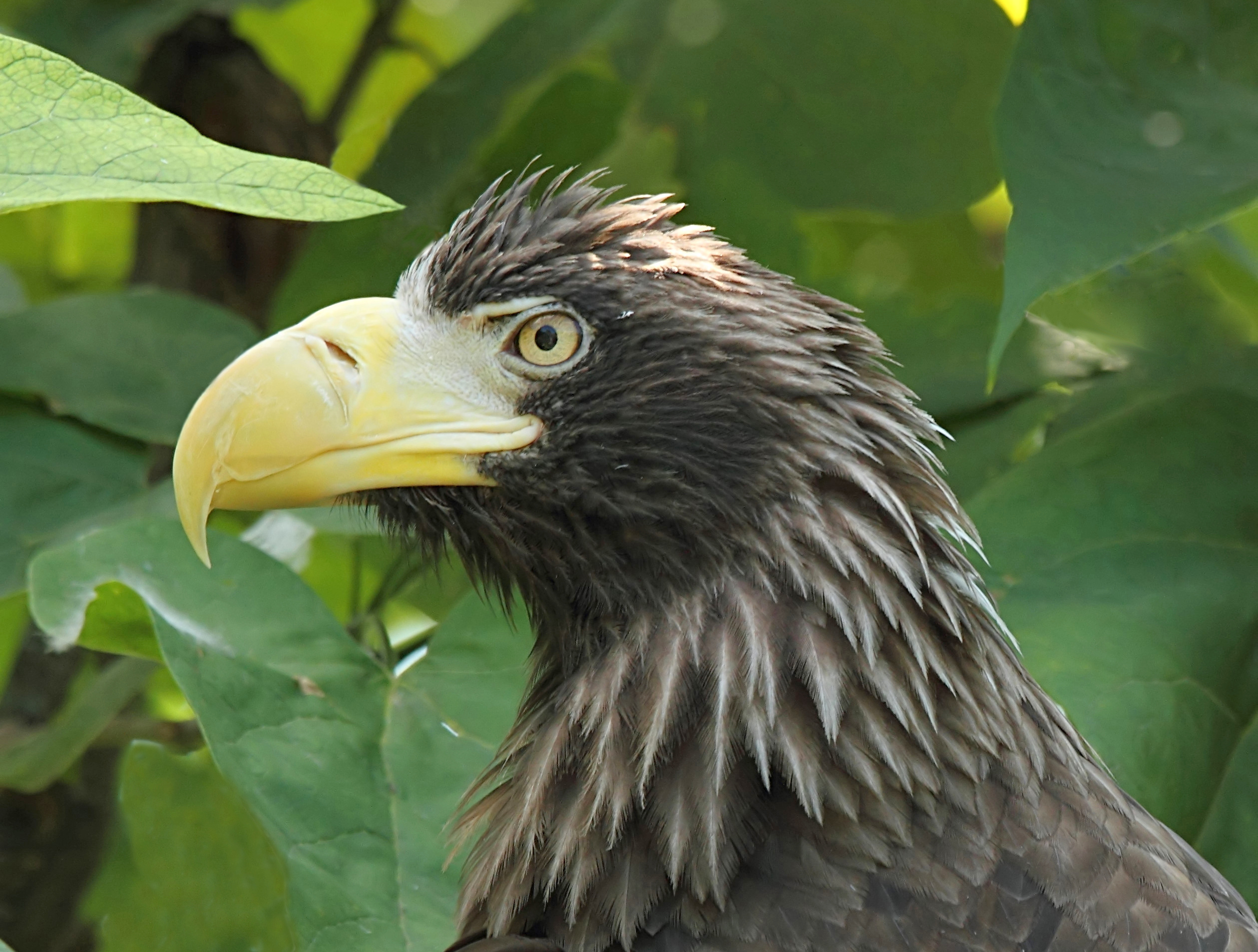
Detail of head of a Steller's sea eagle in the Cincinnati Zoo, United States

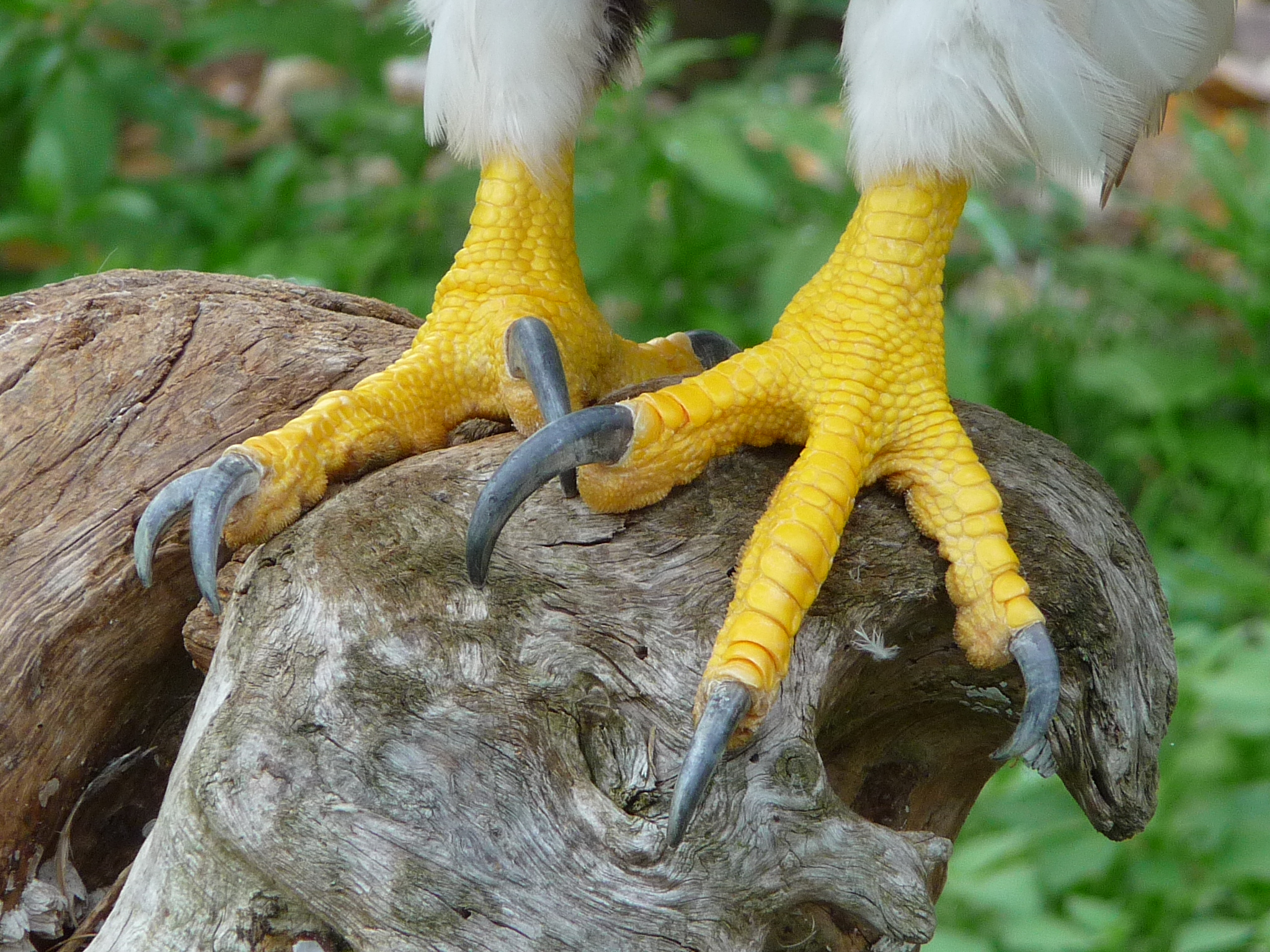
Close-up of feet with hooked sharp talons Full length Steller's sea eagle

As in most Haliaeetus eagles, the tarsus and tail are relatively short compared to other very large eagles at 95–100 mm (3.7–3.9 in) and 320–390 mm (13–15 in) in length, respectively, with the Philippine eagle surpassing it by up to 40 mm (1.6 in) and 110 mm (4.3 in), apparently. In all sea and fish eagles, the toes are relatively short and stout, with the bottom of the foot covered in spicules and the talons being relatively shorter and more strongly curved than in comparably sized eagles of forests and fields, such as the "booted eagle" group (i.e. Aquila) or "harpy eagles". All of these specializations developed in the aid of capturing fish rather than medium-sized mammals and large birds, although, clearly these are not excluded from capture.

As in all fish and sea eagles, as well as the majority of the world's fish-eating raptors, Steller's sea eagle has spicules, which are bumpy waves all along the bottom of their feet, which allow them to hold fish that may otherwise slip out of their grasp. The feet are very powerful despite not bearing talons as long as those of a harpy eagle. In one case, a wildlife veterinarian was badly injured when a female eagle grabbed his arm and embedded her talons, piercing through to the other side of his arm.

The bill is large. The skull is around 14.6 cm (5.7 in) in total length, the culmen is from 62 to 75 mm (2.4 to 3.0 in), and the bill from the gape to the tip is around 117 mm (4.6 in). A Steller's sea eagle's bill is probably the largest of any living eagle, just surpassing the Philippine eagle with a sole known culmen measurement (from a mature female) of 72.2 mm (2.84 in), and are similar in robustness (if slightly shorter in culmen length) to those of the largest accipitrids, the Old World vultures.

=== Plumage ===
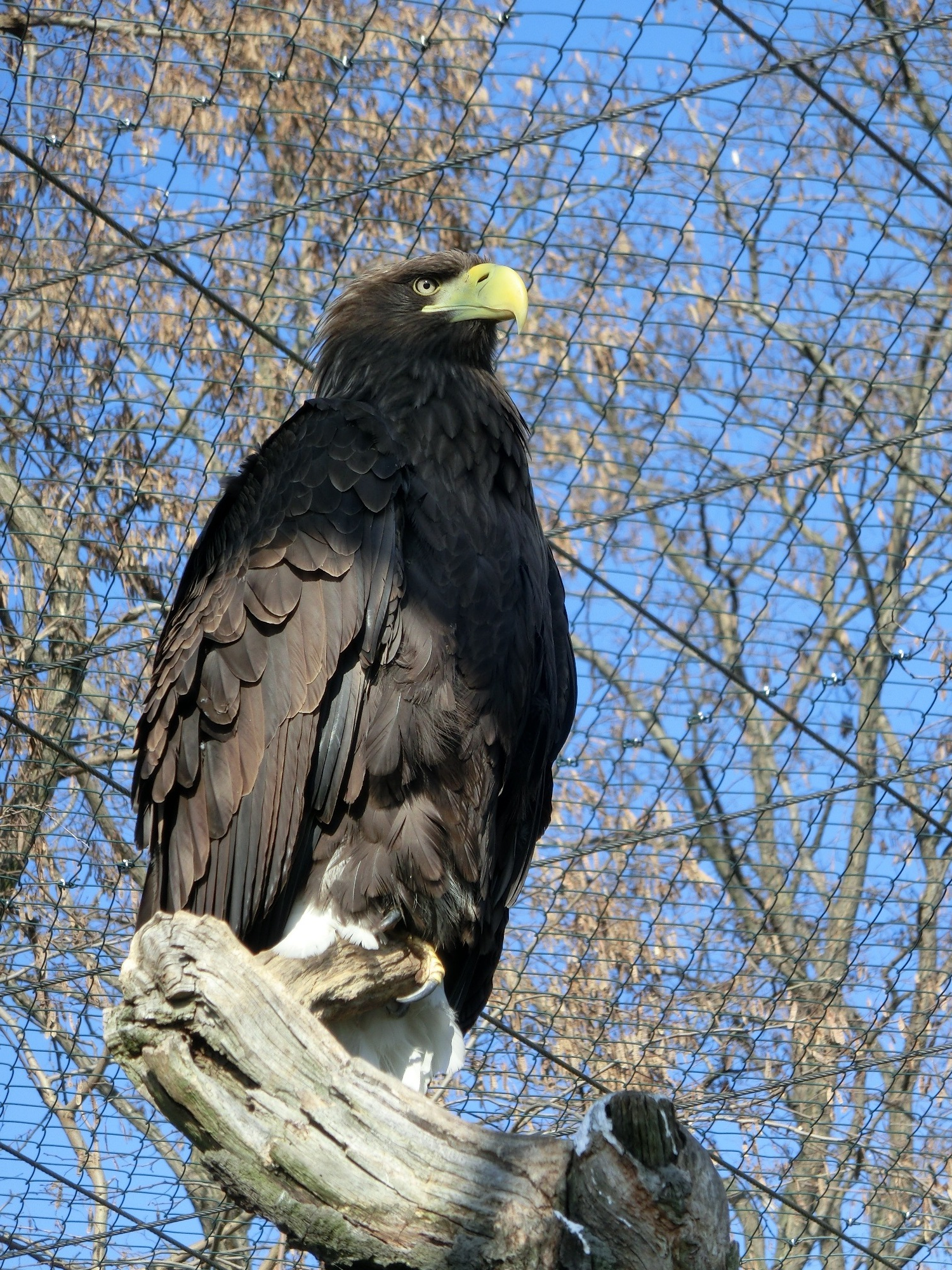
Adult of the rare dark morph in Tierpark Berlin, Germany: Before the hatching of this female, which had "normal" parents, the dark morph was considered a separate subspecies.

Mature H. pelagicus eagles have mostly dark brown to black plumage, with strongly contrasting white on the lesser and median upper-wing coverts, under-wing coverts, thighs, under-tail coverts, and tail. Their diamond-shaped, white tails are relatively longer than those of the white-tailed eagle. The bold, pied coloration of adults may play some part in social hierarchies with other eagles of their own species during the nonbreeding season, although this has not been extensively studied. A very rare dark morph, once regarded as a separate subspecies, H. p. niger, lacks white in its plumage, except for the tail. The eyes, bill, and feet of adults are yellow.

The downy plumage of chicks is silky white on hatching, though it soon turns a smoky brown-grey. As in other sea eagles, remiges and rectrices of the first-year plumage are longer than those of adults. Juvenile plumage is largely a uniform dark soot-brown with occasional grey-brown streaking about the head and the neck, white feather bases, and light mottling on the rectrices. The tail of the immature eagle is white with black mottling distally. The young Steller's sea eagle has dark brown irises, whitish legs, and blackish-brown beak. Through at least three intermediate plumages, mottling in the tail decreases, body and wing feathering acquires a bronze cast, and the eyes and bill lighten in colour. Definitive plumage is probably reached in the fourth to fifth year of life, based on data from captives. Young of the typical morph and the rare dark morph are alike. The difference only becomes clear once they have gained the adult plumage.

First and intermediate plumages are difficult to distinguish from those of the white-tailed eagle, which co-occurs in the entire breeding range of H. pelagicus, but beyond their bulkier, larger overall form, they can fairly reliably be distinguished at reasonable range by their considerably more massive bill and their darker and more uniform body plumage. This is not to mention the differing shape of the Steller's diamond-shaped tail and wings (paddle-like in Steller's against the square-looking wings of the white-tailed), especially in flight, as well as a generally distinct under-wing pattern.

=== Voice ===
Steller's sea eagle is known to make a deep barking cry, ra-ra-ra-raurau, and honking calls similar to that of Canada geese. In aggressive interactions, its call is similar to the white-tailed eagles, but deeper. During the display at the beginning of the breeding season, they have been heard to make calls to each other that sound like very loud, deep-voiced gulls.

== Distribution and habitat ==
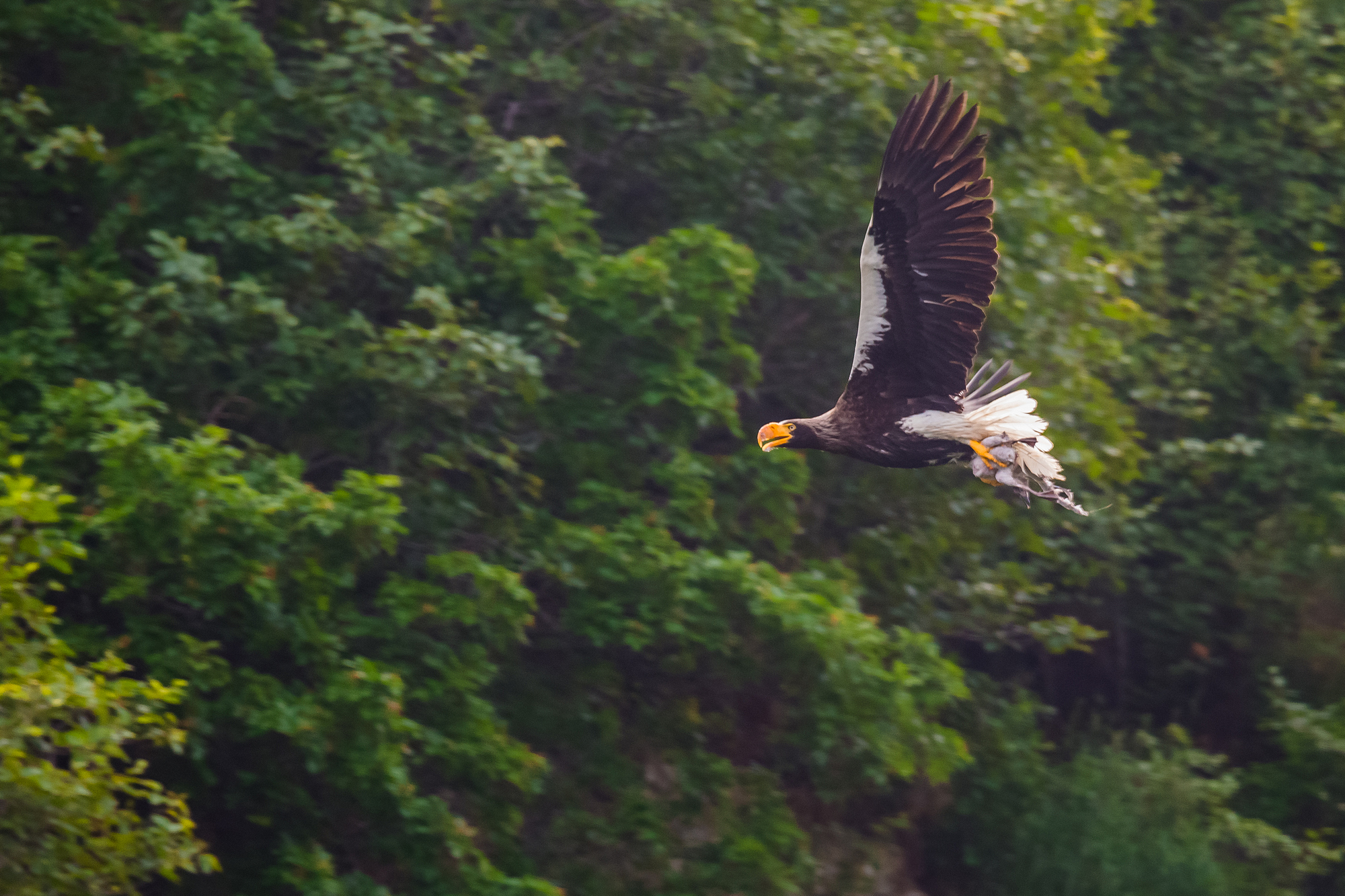
Adult in the Magadan Nature Reserve, Russia, a part of the species' breeding range

Steller's sea eagle breeds on the Kamchatka Peninsula, the coastal area around the Sea of Okhotsk, the lower reaches of the Amur River, and on northern Sakhalin and the Shantar Islands, Russia. Many eagles migrate from breeding grounds to Korea, Japan, and China in winter. Most birds winter south of their breeding range, in the southern Kuril Islands, Russia, and Hokkaidō, Japan. Steller's sea eagle is less prone to vagrancy than the white-tailed eagle, as it lacks the long-range dispersal typical of juveniles of that species, but vagrant eagles have been found in North America at locations including the Aleutian Islands, Pribilof Islands, and Kodiak Island, as well as a single individual seen in Texas, Nova Scotia, Massachusetts, Maine, and Newfoundland and Labrador, and inland in Asia to as far as Beijing in China and Yakutsk in Russia's Sakha Republic, and south to as far as Taiwan.

The large body size (see also Bergmann's rule) and distribution of Steller's sea eagle suggests it is a glacial relict, meaning it evolved in a narrow subarctic zone of the northeasternmost Asian coasts, which shifted its latitude according to ice age cycles, and never occurred anywhere else. Their nests are built on large, rocky outcroppings or at the tops of large trees on the coast and alongside large rivers with mature trees. Habitat with large Erman's birches (Betula ermanii) and floodplain forests of larches, alders, willows, and poplars are preferred. Some eagles, especially those that nest on seacoasts, may not migrate. The timing, duration, and extent of migration depends on ice conditions and food availability.

On Kamchatka, eagles overwinter in forests and river valleys near the coast, but are irregularly distributed over the peninsula. Most wintering birds there appear to be residential adults. Steller's sea eagles that do migrate fly south to winter in rivers and wetlands in Japan, but occasionally move to mountainous inland areas as opposed to the seacoast. Each winter, drifting ice on the Sea of Okhotsk drives thousands of eagles south. Ice reaches Hokkaido in late January.

Eagle numbers peak in the Nemuro Strait in late February. On Hokkaido, eagles concentrate in coastal areas and on lakes near the coast, along with substantial numbers of white-tailed eagles. Eagles depart between late March and late April, with adults typically leaving before immatures. Migrants tend to follow seacoasts and are usually observed flying singly. In groups, migrants are typically observed flying 100–200 m (330–660 ft) apart. On Kamchatka, most migrants are birds in transitional plumages. They are also occasionally seen flying over the northern ocean or perching on sea ice during the winter.

=== Vagrancy ===
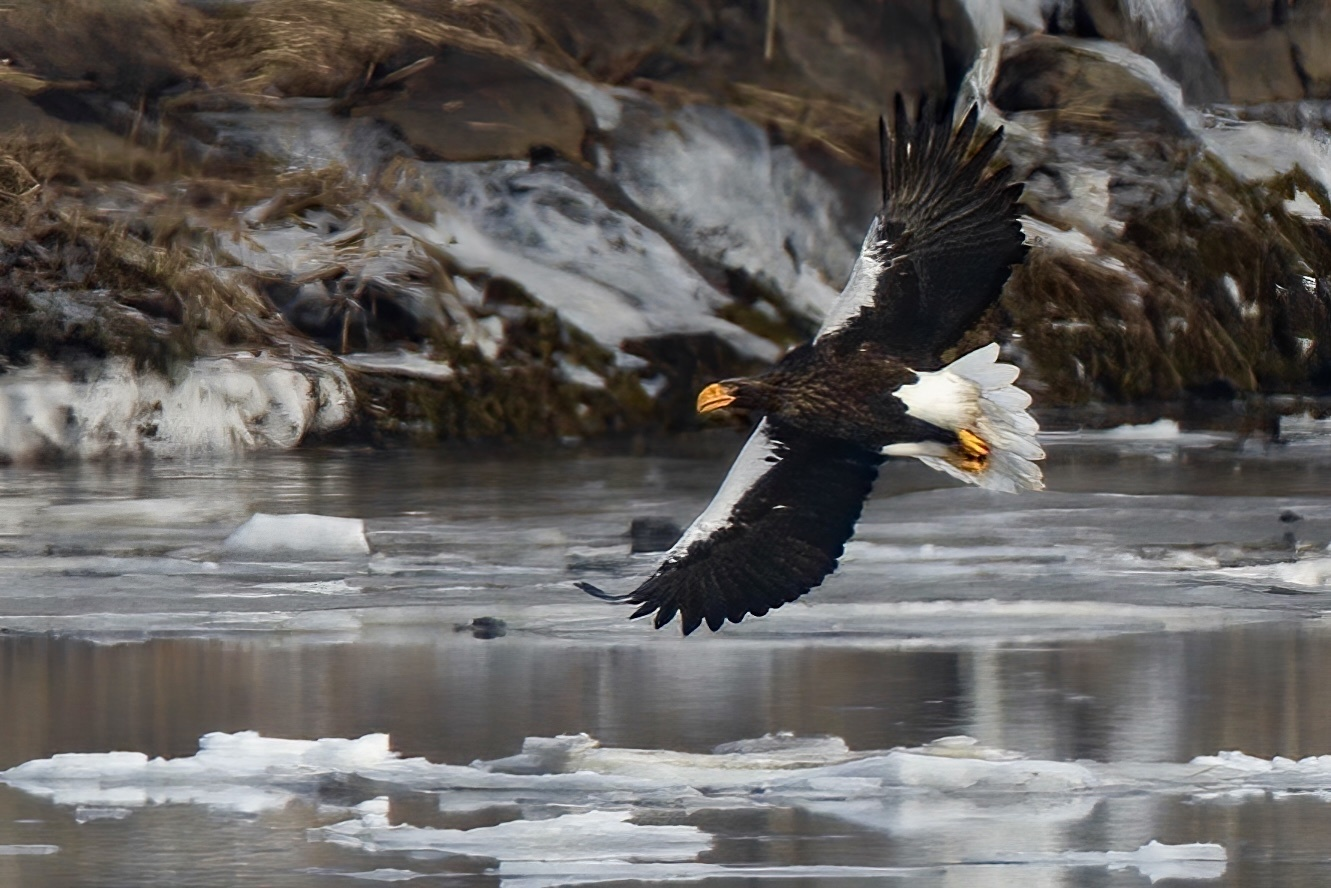
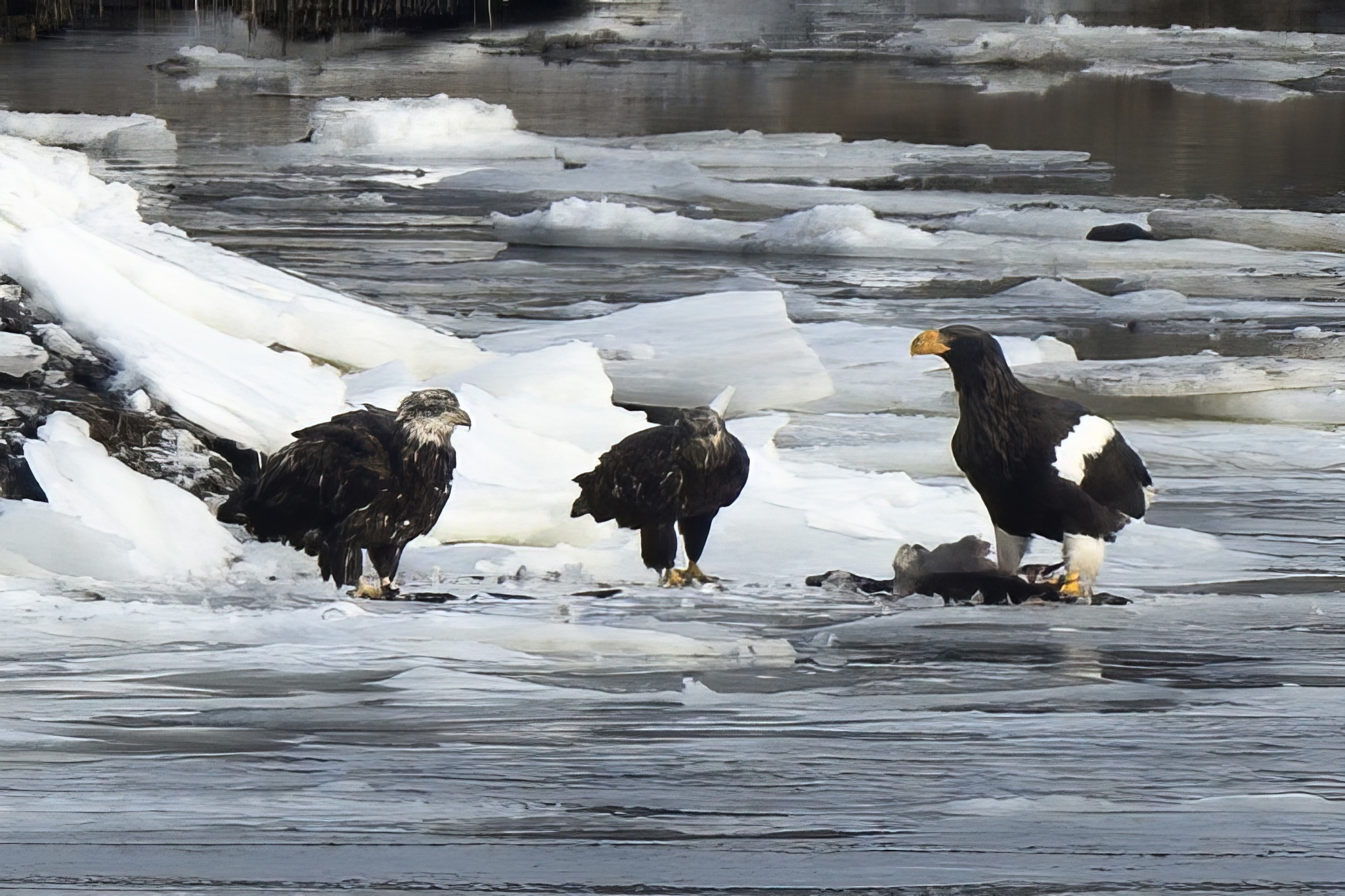
Vagrant individual in Maine. The second photo has it interacting with two juvenile bald eagles (left)

A single individual has been moving around North America, having first been seen on August 30, 2020, near Denali National Park in Alaska. Subsequently, a Steller's sea eagle was photographed in Victoria, TX, not long after a winter storm blew into the state. This sighting has been verified by the Texas Bird Records Committee and is presumed to be the same individual as seen in Denali, though the photos are not sufficient to establish this identity. This was the first record of the species in the contiguous United States. The sea eagle was then confirmed in several locations in New Brunswick, Quebec, and Nova Scotia throughout the summer and into November. In December, it was spotted on the Taunton River in Massachusetts and then moved north to the Maine coast (Georgetown, Boothbay, and Pemaquid). More recently, it was seen on the east side on Newfoundland on April 22, 2022, and in early 2023 was spotted in Maine along the shores of Georgetown, before returning to Newfoundland and staying on the island year-round ever since. Marks on the wing indicate that all these sightings are of the same individual. This bird has been nicknamed "Stella" and garnered significant attention from birders, who boosted the local economy when traveling to see it.

Beginning in the spring of 2024 in Newfoundland, the Steller's sea eagle was reported to be showing nesting behaviour, and has been aggressive and hostile towards bald eagles nesting nearby.

== Diet ==
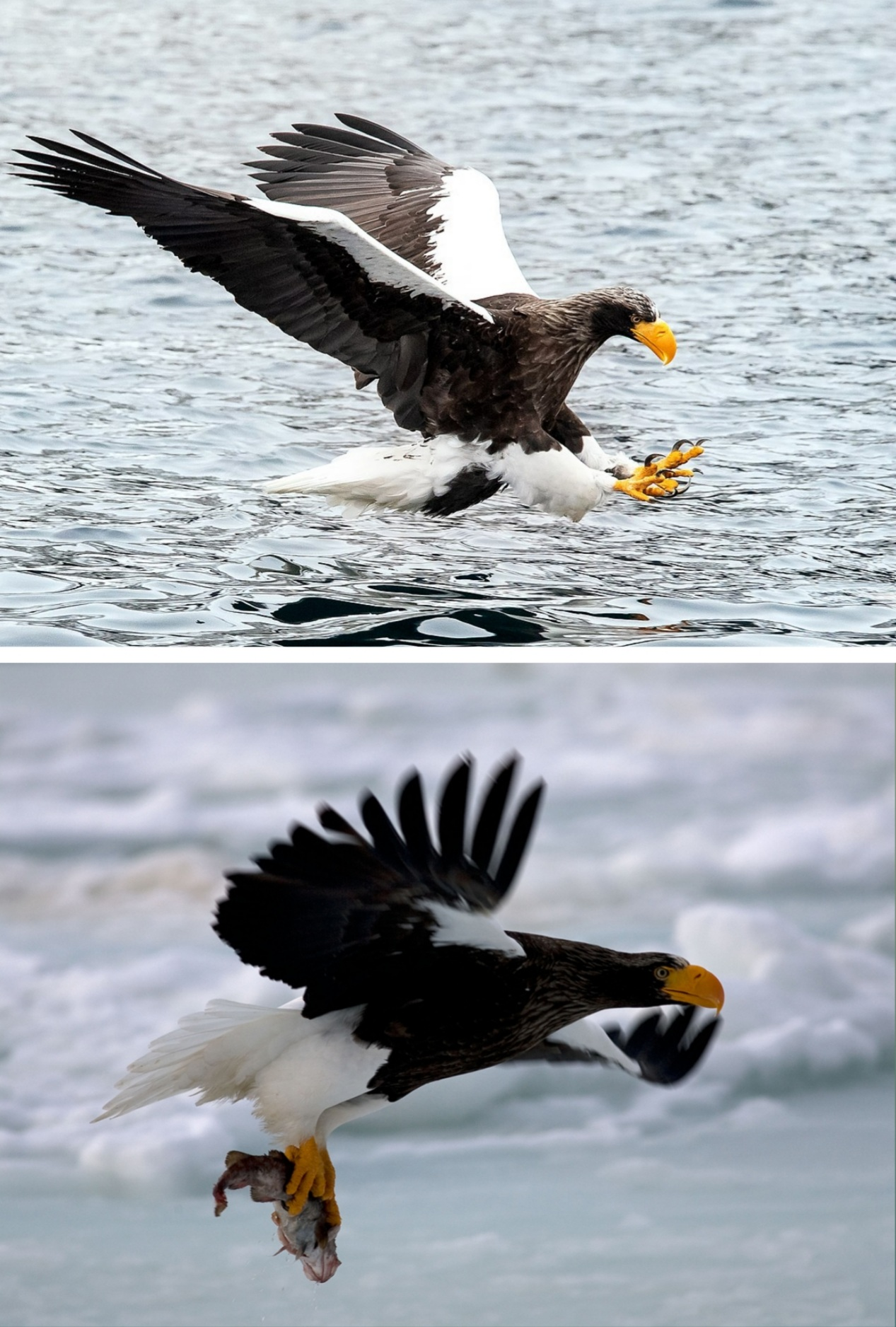
Steller's sea eagles near Rausu, Hokkaido, in Japan: catching a fish (top) and carrying a fish (bottom)

Steller's sea eagle mainly feed on fish and are apex predators of their environment. Their favored prey in river habitats are salmon and trout (of the Pacific salmon genus; Oncorhynchus spp.). Among these, pink salmon (O. gorbuscha) and chum salmon (O. keta) are reportedly favored, sometimes intensely supplemented by grayling (Thymallus sp.) and three-spined stickleback (Gasterosteus aculeatus). While pink and chum salmon average approximately 2.2 and 5 kg (4.9 and 11.0 lb) in mature mass, respectively, Steller's sea eagle not infrequently preys on fish up to 6 to 7 kg (13 to 15 lb). In coastal areas, nesting eagles may feed on Bering wolffish (Anarchichas orientalis), Hemitripterus villosus, smooth lumpfish (Aptocyclus ventricosus), and Myoxocephalus spp. Like most Haliaeetus eagles, they hunt fish almost exclusively in shallow water. Relatively large numbers of these normally solitary birds can be seen congregating on particularly productive spawning rivers in August through September due to an abundant food supply.

On Kamchatka, aggregations of as many as 700 eagles have been reported, though much smaller groups are the norm. In summer, live fish, typically in the range of 20 to 30 cm (7.9 to 11.8 in) in length, are fed to the young at the nest. Normally, the parents catch about two or three fish for the young to eat each day. In autumn, when many salmon die after spawning, dead fish tend to be consumed more often than live ones, and these are the main food for Steller's sea eagles that overwinter in inland rivers with unfrozen waters.

On Hokkaido, eagles are attracted by abundant Pacific cod (Gadus macrocephalus), which peak in the Rausu Sea and the Nemuro Straits in February. This resource supports an important commercial fishery, which, in turn, helps to support eagles. Alaska pollock (Gadus chalcogrammus), along with the cod, is the most important food source for wintering eagles in Japan. These eagles may walk boldly within a few feet of fishermen when both are capturing fish during winter, but only familiar ones they have encountered previously. They behave warily and keep their distance if strangers are present.

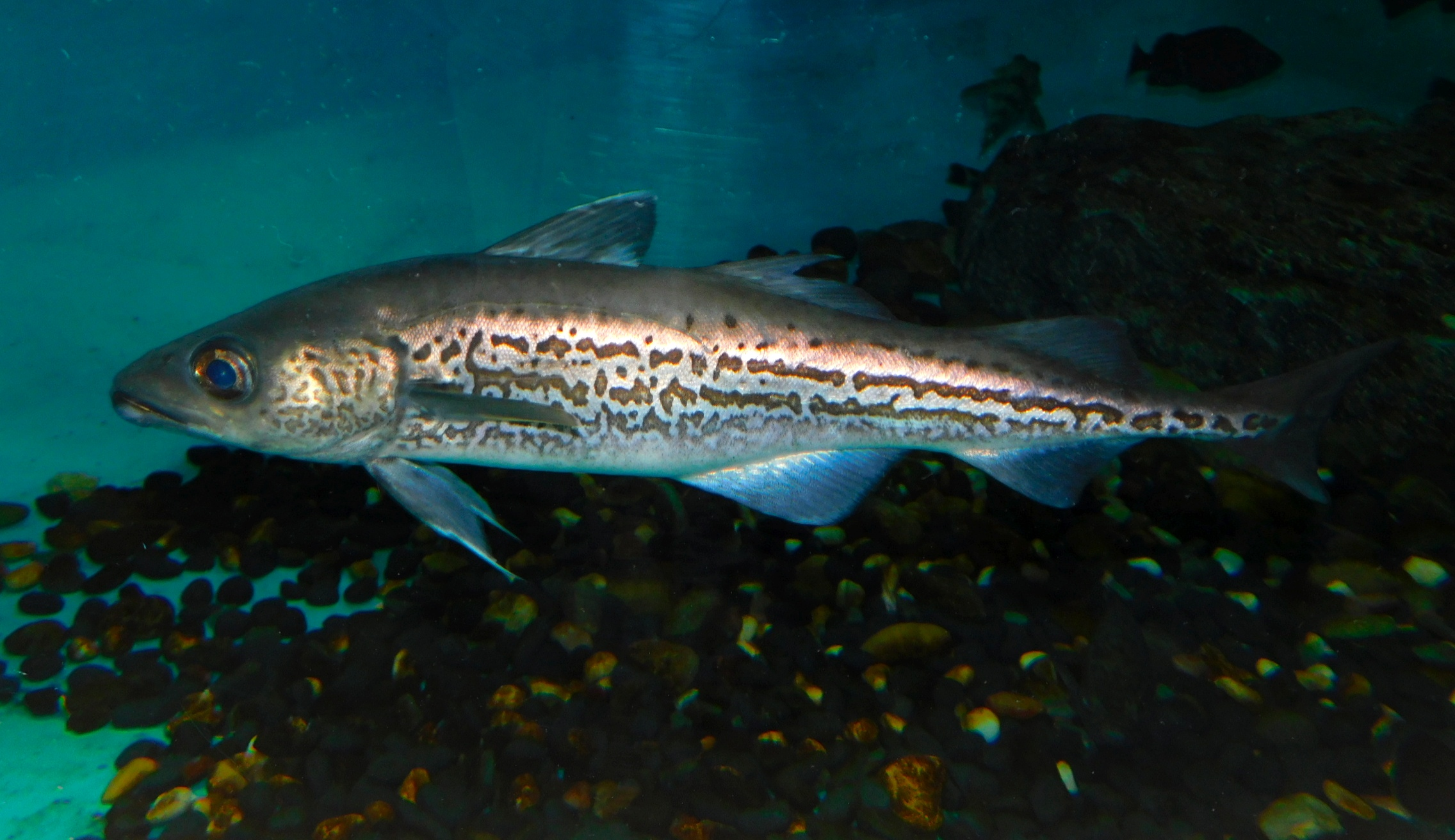
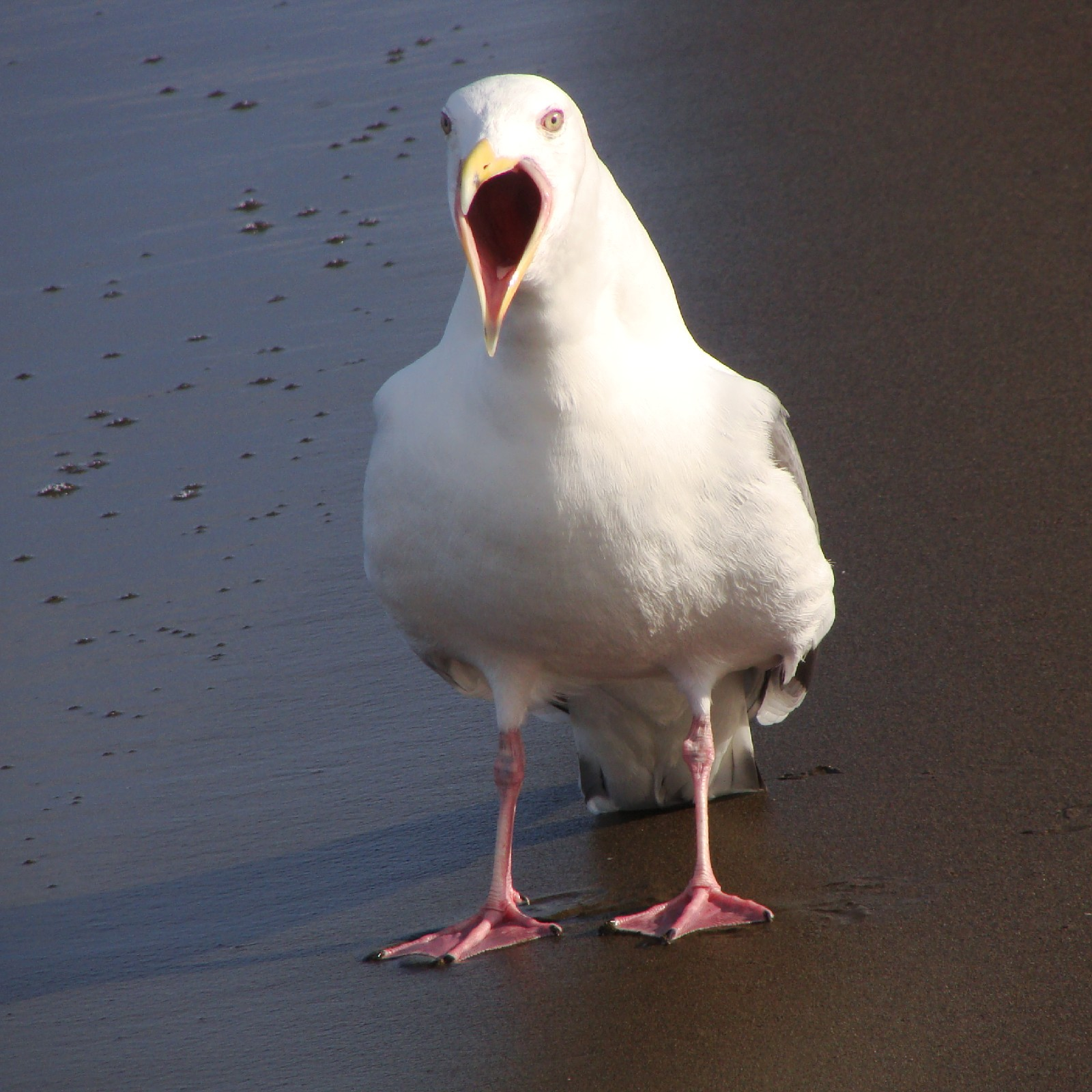
Two common food items for the Steller's sea eagle: the Alaska pollock and the slaty-backed gull

Fish make up about 80% of the diet of eagles nesting in the Amur River; elsewhere, other prey form almost an equal proportion of the diet. Along the sea coast and in Kamchatka, water birds are the most common prey. Water birds taken by this species include ducks, geese, swans, cranes, herons, and gulls. They also show a strong local preference for slaty-backed gulls (Larus schistisagus).

Common and thick-billed murres (Uria aalge and U. lomvia, respectively) dominated the diet around the Sea of Okhotsk, followed by black-legged kittiwakes (Rissa tridactyla), slaty-backed gulls, crested auklets (Aethia cristatella), and pelagic cormorants (Phalacrocorax pelagicus). Small chicks of murres and cormorants were sometimes taken alive in Russia and brought back to nests, where they independently fed on remains of fish in the eagles' nests until they were killed themselves. In Russia, upland grouse, such as black-billed capercaillie (Tetrao parvirostris) and willow and rock ptarmigan (Lagopus lagopus & L. muta) can be an important prey species; grouse are not typically taken by other Haliaeetus species. Other landbirds hunted by Steller's sea eagles have included short-eared owls (Asio flammeus), snowy owl (Bubo scandiaca), carrion crow (Corvus corone), and common raven (Corvus corax), as well as (rarely) smaller passerines. In one case, a Steller's sea eagle was observed feeding on a great albatross (genus Diomedea), a rare vagrant from the sub-Antarctic oceans. This sea eagle may supplement its diet with various mammals (especially hares), crabs, mussels, Nereis worms, and squid when given the opportunity.

Mammalian carnivores are apparently readily hunted. Those recorded as prey have included sable (Martes zibellina), American mink (Neogale vison), Arctic fox (Vulpes lagopus), red fox (Vulpes vulpes), and small domestic dogs (Canis familiaris). Smaller mammals have also been recorded as prey, including northern red-backed vole (Clethrionomys rutilus) and tundra vole (Microtus oeconomus). Carrion, especially that of mammals, is readily eaten during the winter. Around 35% of eagles wintering in Japan move inland and feed largely on mammalian carcasses, predominantly sika deer (Cervus nippon). In winter, immature Steller's sea eagles may frequent slaughterhouses to pirate bits of offal. This eagle has been recorded preying occasionally on young seals. It was estimated in one study (Brown & Amadon), that some seal pups carried off in flight by the eagles weighed at least 9.1 kg (20 lb), which (if true) would be the greatest load-carrying ever known for a bird; however, the prey weights were not verified. Often seals and sea lion of any size are eaten as carrion and, using the huge bill, may be dismembered where found rather than flown with.

Steller's sea eagles hunt most commonly from a perch in a tree or rocky ledge located 5–30 m (16–98 ft) above the water, although they may also hunt on the wing, while circling 6–7 m (20–23 ft) above the water. Once located, prey is captured by diving. Eagles sometimes hunt by standing in or near shallow water on a sandbank, spit, or ice-floe, grabbing passing fish. Compared with its white-tailed and bald eagle relatives, Steller's sea eagle reportedly is a more "aggressive, powerful, and active" raptor. Where feeding occurs in groups, kleptoparasitism is common, with adults appearing to benefit most often from this behavior. Kleptoparasitism is most beneficial in procuring food during periods of food abundance and in large feeding aggregations, and immature birds use it as much as adults, but are attacked more often by adults, in contrast to kleptoparasitic behavior between birds of similar age. The bold color patterns of adults may be an important signal influencing the formation of feeding groups. However, a video from Russia shows a juvenile Steller's sea eagle aggressively displacing an adult from food during a protracted battle. Outside the breeding period, these eagles probably roost communally near their feeding sites. When salmon and trout are dying in winter after their summer spawning, feeding groups of Steller's sea eagles may mix with smaller golden eagles (Aquila chrysaetos) and white-tailed eagles to exploit this food source. This area is the only one in the golden eagle's nearly circumpolar range where they are extensively dependent on fish for prey.

=== Interspecific competition ===
Occasionally, a smaller species of eagle may steal a fish away from the Steller's, especially if it is distracted by aggression from conspecifics, and both juvenile and adult Steller's may lose fish to the smaller species even face-to-face, especially a less assertive bird, such as immature Steller's. One video shows a golden eagle engaging an immature Steller's in a conflict and ultimately displacing it after maintaining a superior grip despite its smaller size. In other cases, the Steller's have been photographed coming away with the prey after using its superior size to dominate, usually by bearing down its mass and large bill over the smaller eagles.

In other cases, the three eagle species have been observed to feed in close proximity and seem to be outwardly indifferent to each other's presence. In inland areas, where golden, bald, and white-tailed eagles compete over food sources which are not as abundant as these fish and, more importantly, compete for nesting ranges, aggressive interspecies competition can be more common. White-tailed eagles and golden eagles have even killed one another in Scotland, in cases of competition for abutting nesting ranges. As in many sea and fish eagles, Steller's sea eagle may attempt to steal (and occasionally succeed in procuring) fish from osprey (Pandion haliaetus) where they coexist. Steller's sea eagles co-occur with cinereous vultures, the largest living accipitrid, during the winter in the Korean Peninsula and Northeast China. In one case, a cinereous vulture was observed to be pursued in flight and kleptoparasitized by a Steller's sea eagle.

== Reproduction ==
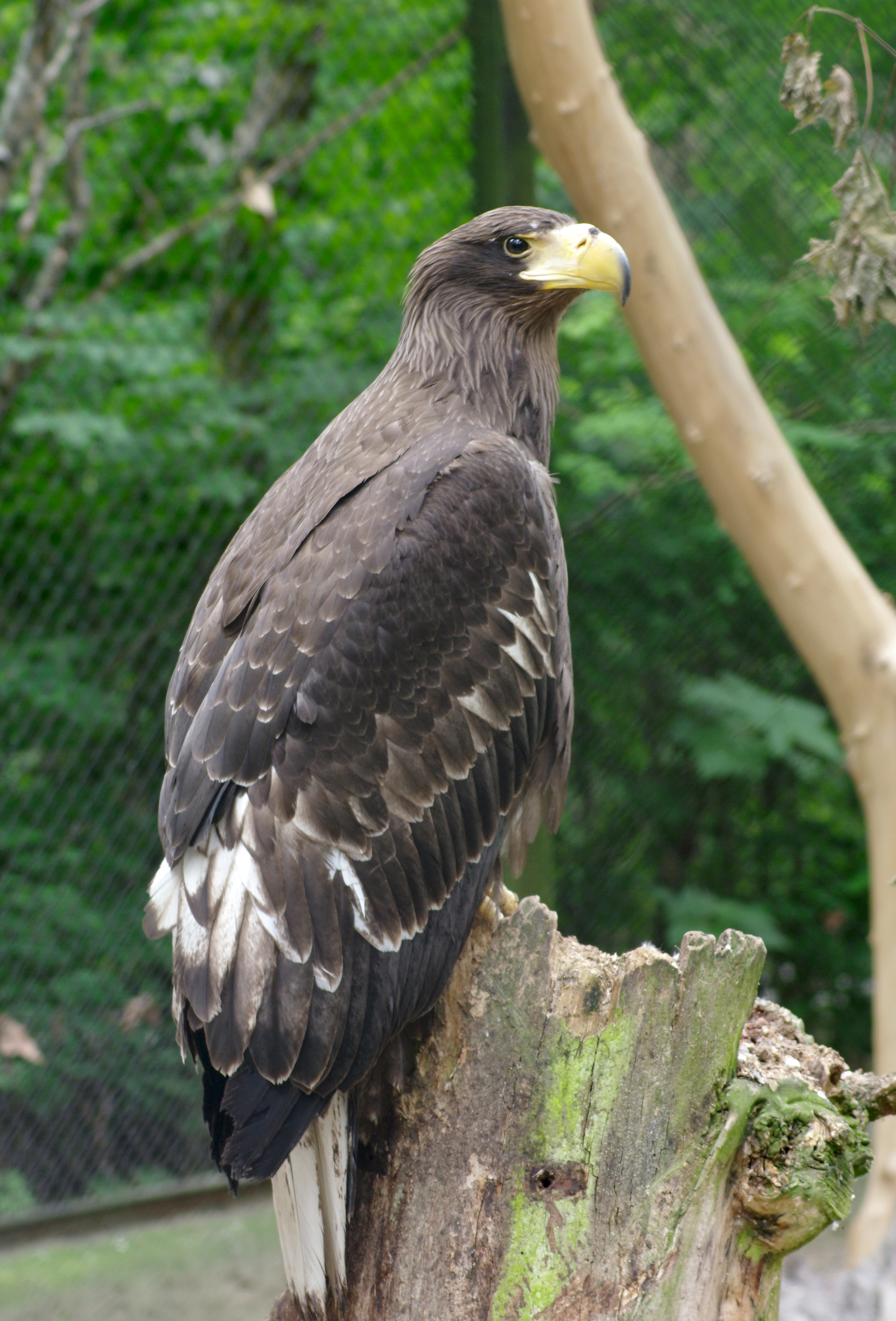
An immature in Łódź Zoo, Poland. Steller's sea eagles take several years to reach maturity, attaining the adult color pattern when four.

This eagle builds several bulky aeries made of twigs and sticks at a height up to 1.5 m (59 in) and diameter up to 2.5 m (98 in). They usually place such nests high up on trees or on rocky outcrops at 15 to 20 m (49 to 66 ft) above the ground, sometimes in trees up to 45 m (148 ft). Alternate nests are usually built within 900 m (3,000 ft) of each other. In one case, two active nests were found to have been located within 100 m (330 ft).

Courtship usually occurs between February and March, and reportedly simply consists of a soaring flight above the breeding area. It was believed that pairs of sea eagles remain constant throughout life; however, the results of molecular genetic studies show that some chicks have relatively high similarity with chicks from other nests. This can be a clue to occasional polygamy in colonial nesting birds, though alternative hypotheses such as the parents of "conditional" siblings were close relatives exist. Steller's sea eagles copulate on the nest after building it. They lay their first greenish-white eggs around April to May. The eggs range from 78 to 85 mm (3.1 to 3.3 in) height and 57.5 to 64.5 mm (2.26 to 2.54 in) in width and weigh around 160 g (5.6 oz), being slightly larger than those of harpy eagles. Clutches can contain from one to three eggs, with two being the average. Usually, only one chick survives to adulthood, though in some cases as many as three will successfully fledge. After an incubation period around 39 – 45 days the chicks hatch. The chicks are altricial and covered in whitish-down on hatching. The eaglets fledge in August or early September. Adult plumage is attained at four years of age, but first breeding does not typically occur for another year or two.

Eggs and very small nestlings can be preyed on by arboreal mammals, such as sables and ermines, and birds, usually corvids. Any of these small, clever nest predators rely on distraction and stealth to prey on the eagle's nests and are killed if caught by either of the parents. Once they reach roughly adult size in the fledgling stage, few predators can threaten this species. In one case, a brown bear (Ursus arctos) was able to access a nest located on a rock formation and ate a fledgling eaglet, though this is believed to be exceptional. Fully-grown fledglings in tree nests are probably invulnerable to predation. Excluding the Asian black bear (Ursus thibetanus), which has not thus far been recorded as a predator, no other mammalian carnivores equal to or greater than the eagle's size can climb trees in the species' range. Due primarily to egg predation and nest collapses, only 45–67% of eggs are successfully reared to adulthood and up to 25% of nestlings may be lost. Once fully grown, though, the eagle has no natural predators.

== Conservation status ==
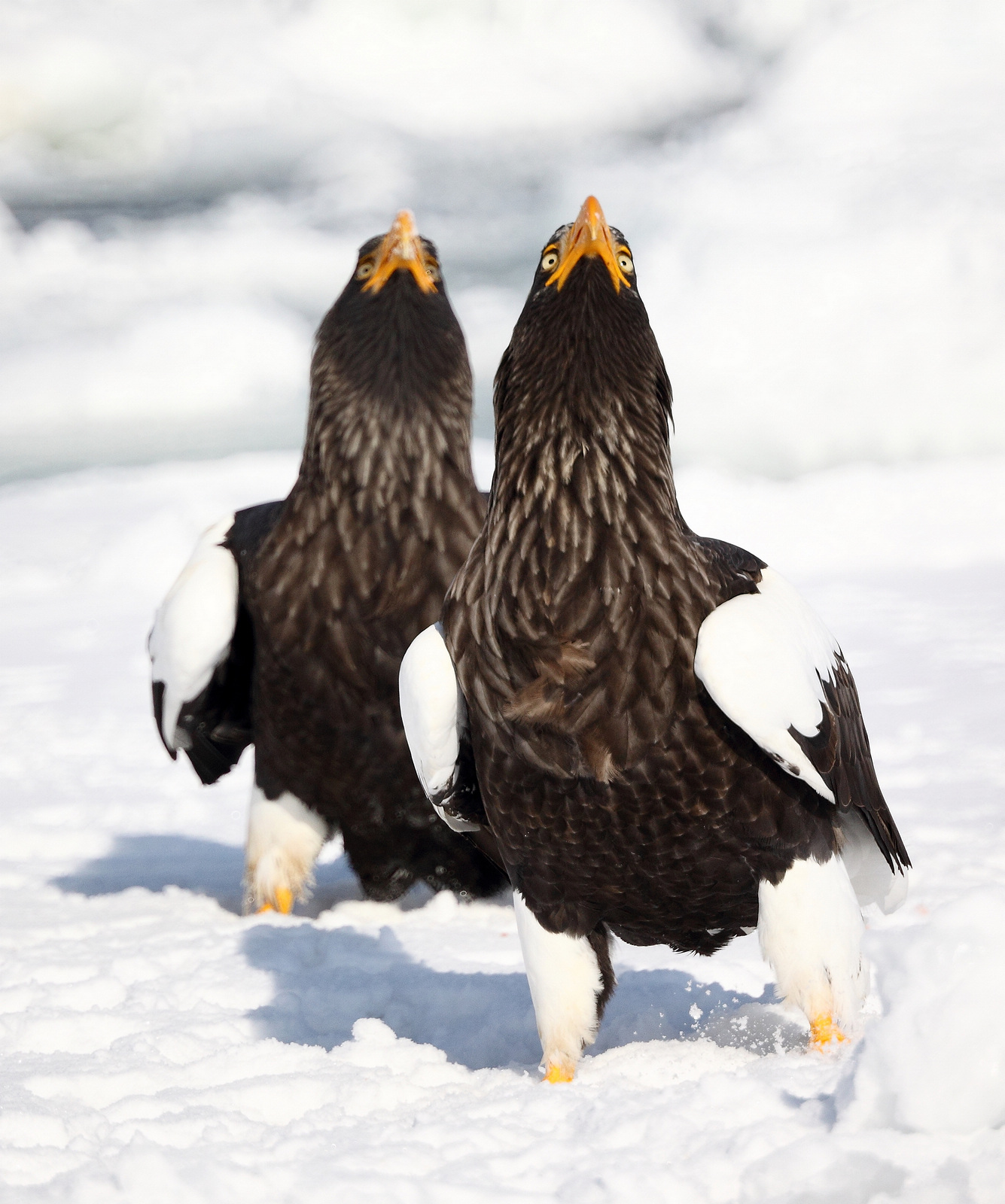
Many Steller's sea eagles overwinter in Japan, where they are protected and classified as a national treasure.

Steller's sea eagles are classified as vulnerable by the IUCN. They are legally protected, being classified as a national treasure in Japan and mostly occurring in protected areas in Russia, but many threats to their survival persist. These mainly include habitat alteration, industrial pollution, and overfishing, which in turn decrease their prey source. The current population is estimated at 5,000 and decreasing. Heavy flooding, which may have been an effect of global climate change, caused almost complete nesting failure for the eagles nesting in Russian rivers due to completely hampering the ability of the parents to capture the fish essential to their nestlings' survival. Persecution of the bird in Russia continues, due to its habit of stealing furbearers from trappers. Due to a lack of other accessible prey in some areas, increasingly, eagles on Hokkaido have moved inland and scavenged on sika deer carcasses left by hunters, exposing them to a risk of lead poisoning through ingestion of lead shot.

In Kamchatka, 320 pairs have been recorded. An additional 89 nesting areas are not monitored. In the mountains of Koryakan and along the Bay of Penshina, over 1,200 pairs breed and at least 1,400 juveniles occur. About 500 pairs live in the Khabarovsk region of the Okhostsk coast, and 100 on the Shantar Islands. Another 600 pairs occur in the lower Amur. About 280 pairs are on Sakhalin Island and a few are on the Kurile Islands. The total population is around 3,200 breeding pairs. Possibly, up to 3,500 birds winter on Kamchatka, and another roughly 2,000 may occur on Hokkaido. Generally, the species' outlook is favorable. Outside the breeding range, food bases in the principal wintering areas are so far secure.
