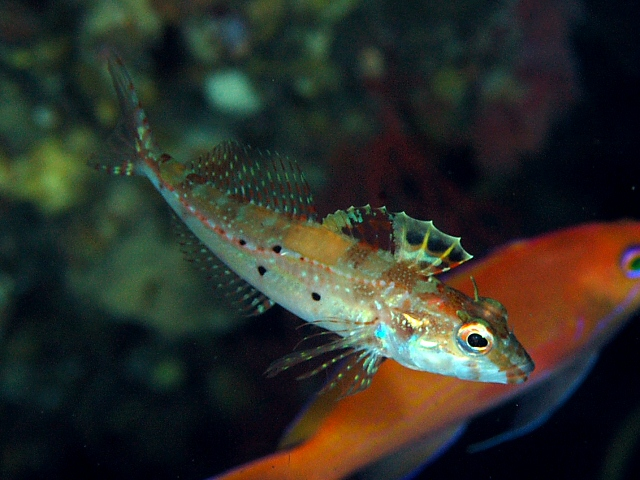
- P. argenteus
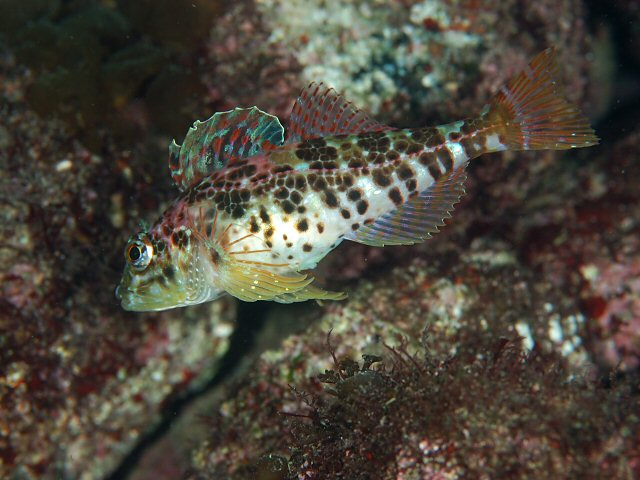
- P. zonostigma

Scientific classification
- Kingdom: Animalia
- Phylum: Chordata
- Class: Actinopterygii
- Division: Teleostei
- Order: Perciformes
- Suborder: Cottoidei
- Superfamily: Cottoidea
- Family: Psychrolutidae
- Genus: Pseudoblennius; Temminck & Schlegel, 1850

Type species
- Pseudoblennius percoides Günther, 1861

= Pseudoblennius =

Genus of fishes

Pseudoblennius is a genus of marine ray-finned fishes belonging to the family Cottidae, the typical sculpins. These fishes are found in the northwestern Pacific Ocean.

== Taxonomy ==
Pseudoblennius was first used as a name by Coenraad Jacob Temminck and Hermann Schlegel in 1850 but they did not designate a type species. Albert Günther designated P. percoides as the type species in 1861. The 5th edition of Fishes of the World classifies the genus Pseudoblennius within the subfamily Cottinae of the family Cottidae, however, other authors classify the genus within the subfamily Psychrolutinae of the family Psychrolutidae.

== Species ==
There are currently six recognized species in this genus:

- Pseudoblennius argenteus (Döderlein, 1887)
- Pseudoblennius cottoides (J. Richardson, 1848)
- Pseudoblennius marmoratus (Döderlein, 1884)
- Pseudoblennius percoides Günther, 1861
- Pseudoblennius totomius D. S. Jordan & Starks, 1904
- Pseudoblennius zonostigma D. S. Jordan & Starks, 1904
