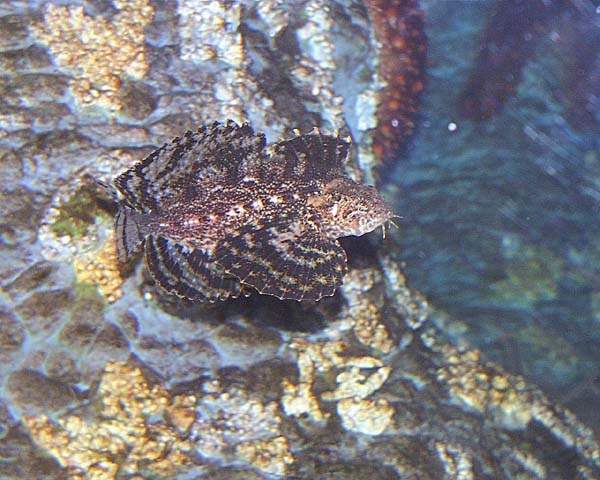
- Crested sculpin (B. bilobus)
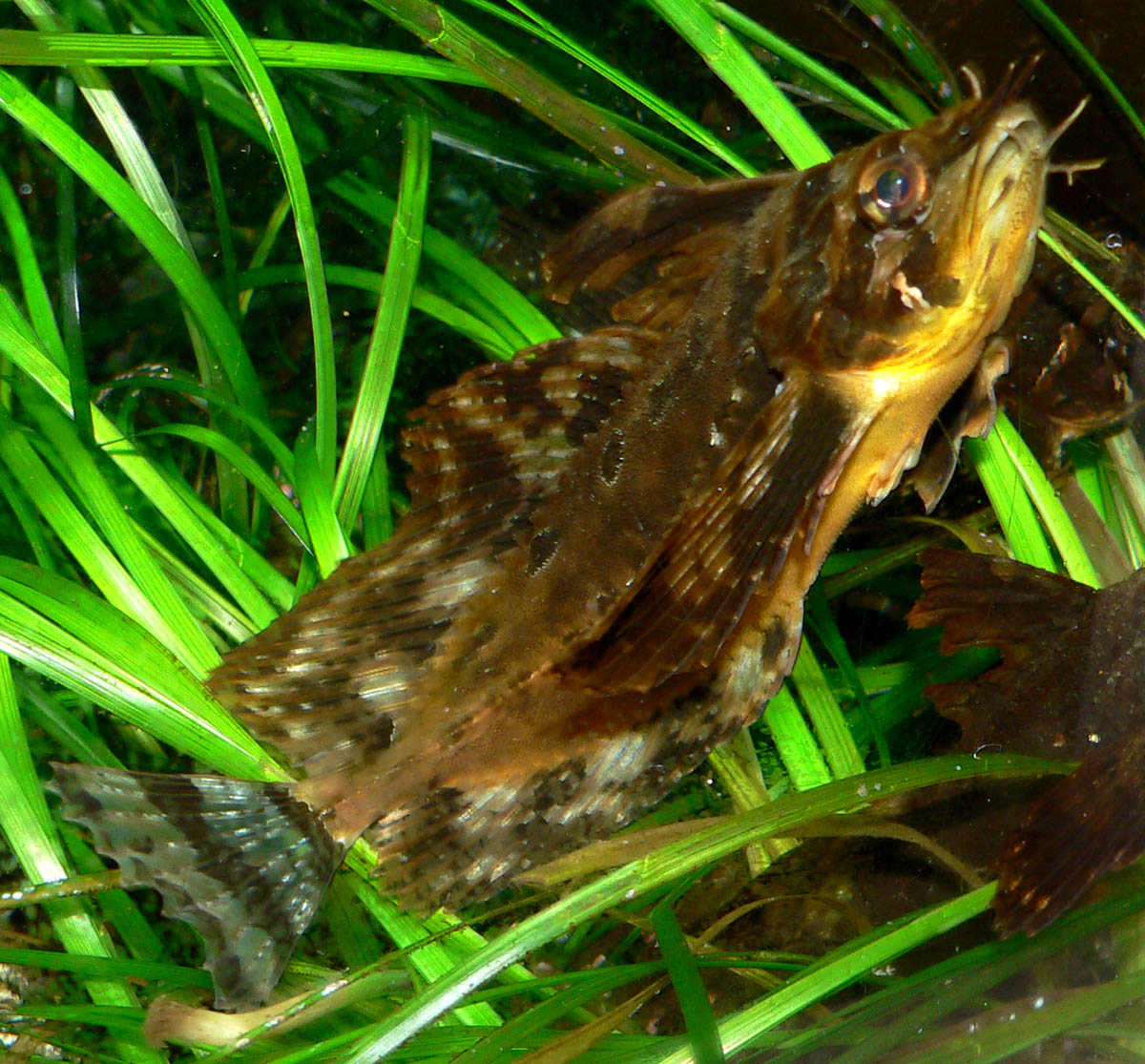
- Silverspotted sculpin (B. cirrhosus)

Scientific classification
- Kingdom: Animalia
- Phylum: Chordata
- Class: Actinopterygii
- Order: Perciformes
- Suborder: Cottoidei
- Family: Hemitripteridae
- Genus: Blepsias; G. Cuvier, 1829

Type species
- Trachinus cirrhosus Pallas, 1814

Synonyms
- Histiocottus Gill, 1889; Peropus Lay & Bennett, 1839; Temnistia Richardson, 1836

= Blepsias =

Genus of marine ray-finned fishes

Blepsias is a genus of marine ray-finned fishes belonging to the family Hemitripteridae, the sea ravens. These fishes are found in the coastal northern Pacific Ocean from Japan to California.

== Taxonomy ==
Blepsias was first proposed as a genus by the French zoologist Georges Cuvier with Trachinus cirrhosus, which had originally been described in 1814 by Peter Simon Pallas from Kamchatka, as the type species. The genus is included in the subfamily Hemitripterinae of the family Agonidae. Cuvier used a Greek name for a fish, as was his habit, for the name of the new genus.

== Species ==
The recognized species in this genus are:

- Blepsias bilobus G. Cuvier, 1829 (crested sculpin)
- Blepsias cirrhosus (Pallas, 1814) (silverspotted sculpin)

== Characteristics ==
Blepsias has a spiny preoperculum, a compressed head, with armoured cheeks and palatine teeth. The large pectoral fins have the lower rays separate from the fin membrane. There are fleshy flaps which hang from the snout. The compressed head separate Blepsias from Hemitripterus. These fishes have maximum published standard lengths of 20 cm (7.9 in) in the case of B. cirrhosus and 25 cm (9.8 in) in B. bilobus.

== Distribution and habitat ==
Blepsias sculpins are found in the North Pacific and the adjacent Arctic waters from Japan and the Sea of Okhotsk north to the Chukchi and Bering seas to central California. They are demersal fishes of shallow, even intertidal, waters where there is algae.
