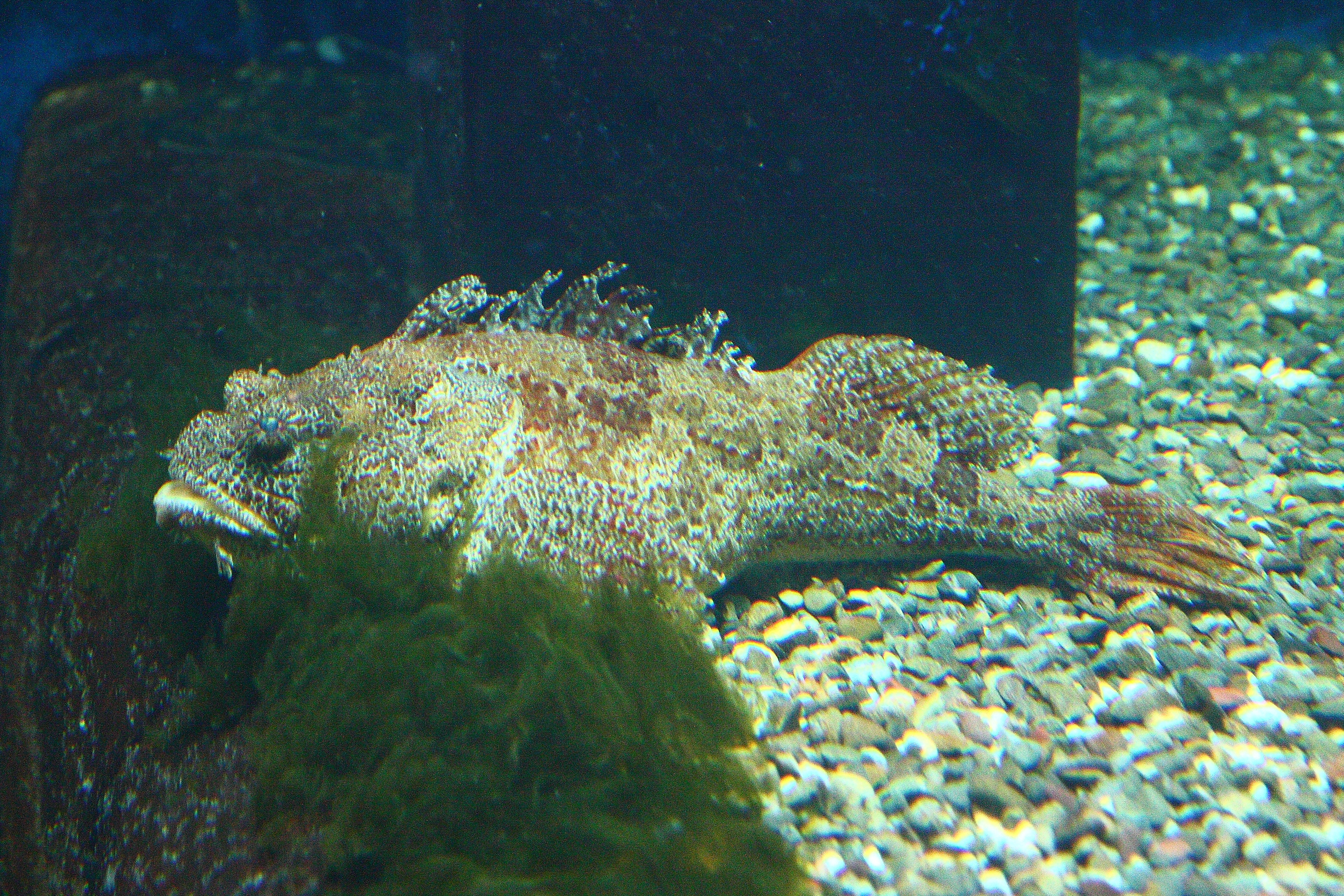
- Sea raven H. americanus

Scientific classification
- Kingdom: Animalia
- Phylum: Chordata
- Class: Actinopterygii
- Order: Perciformes
- Suborder: Cottoidei
- Family: Hemitripteridae
- Genus: Hemitripterus; G. Cuvier, 1829

Type species
- Cottus tripterygius Bloch & Schneider, 1801

Synonyms
- Ulca Jordan & Evermann, 1896

= Hemitripterus =

Genus of fishes

Hemitripterus is a genus of marine ray-finned fishes, sculpins, belonging to the family Hemitripteridae. These fishes are found in the North Pacific and Northwest Atlantic Oceans.

== Species ==
The recognized species in this genus are:

- Hemitripterus americanus (J. F. Gmelin, 1789) (sea raven)
- Hemitripterus bolini (G. S. Myers, 1934) (bigmouth sculpin)
- Hemitripterus villosus (Pallas, 1814)
