= Pseudoblennius zonostigma =

Scientific classification
- Kingdom: Animalia
- Phylum: Chordata
- Class: Actinopterygii
- Order: Perciformes
- Suborder: Cottoidei
- Family: Psychrolutidae
- Genus: Pseudoblennius
- Species: P. zonostigma

Binomial name
- Pseudoblennius zonostigma Jordan & Starks, 1904

Species of sculpin

Pseudoblennius zonostigma is a species of marine ray-finned fish belonging to the family Cottidae, the typical sculpins. This species is found in the Pacific Ocean where it is found in shallow waters around southern Japan and Korea.
