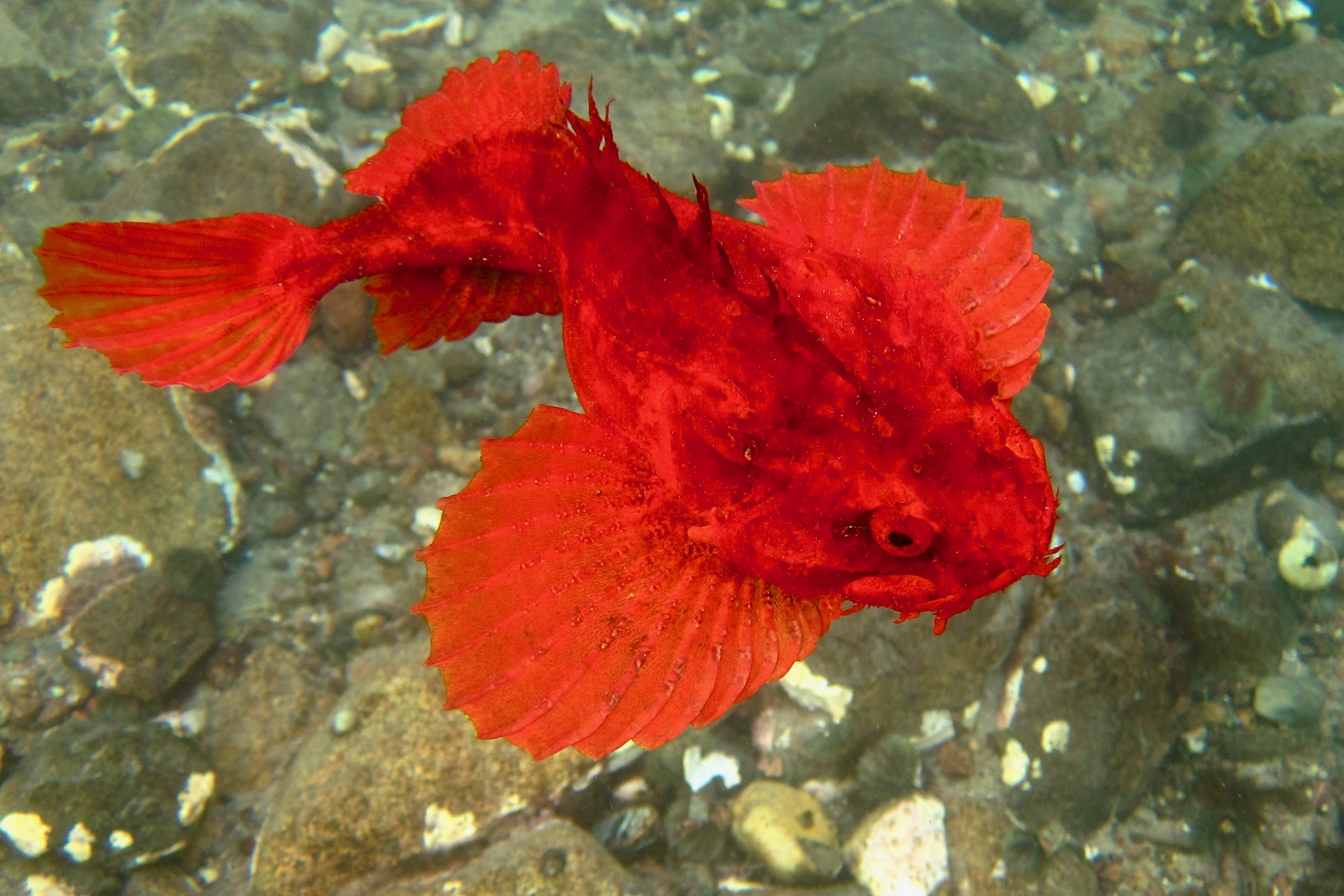

Scientific classification
- Kingdom: Animalia
- Phylum: Chordata
- Class: Actinopterygii
- Order: Perciformes
- Suborder: Cottoidei
- Family: Agonidae
- Genus: Hemitripterus
- Species: H. americanus

Binomial name
- Hemitripterus americanus (Gmelin, 1789)

Synonyms
- Scorpaena americana Gmelin, 1789; Cottus acadian Walbaum, 1792; Cottus hispidus Bloch & Schneider, 1801; Cottus tripterygius Bloch & Schneider, 1801; Scorpaena americana Lacépède, 1801; Scorpaena flava Mitchill, 1815; Scorpaena purpurea Mitchill, 1818; Scorpaena rufa Mitchill, 1818; Hemitripterus americanus Cuvier, 1829; Hemitripterus acadianus Storer, 1853

= Hemitripterus americanus =

Sea raven

Species of fish

Hemitripterus americanus, the sea raven, is a species of marine ray-finned fish belonging to the subfamily Hemitripterinae of the family Agonidae. The sea raven is found along the Atlantic coast of North America.

== Taxonomy ==
Hemitripterus americanus was first formally described as Scorpaena americana in 1789 by the German naturalist Johann Friedrich Gmelin with its type locality given as "America". In 1801 Marcus Elieser Bloch and Johann Gottlob Theaenus Schneider described a new species Cottus tripterygius and in 1829 Georges Cuvier proposed the new monotypic genus Hemitripterus for C. tripterygius which was later shown to be a junior synonym of Gmelin's S. americana. The genus Hemitripterus is classified within the subfamily Hemtripterinae of the family Agonidae.

== Description ==
Hemitripterus americanus are variable in color from blood red to reddish purple to yellow brown. The ventral surface is typically yellow. They have large heads and a robust, tapering body. There are obvious fleshy folds on the head and lower jaw. There is also an unusual ragged layer of skin on the first dorsal fin. They have large, fan-shaped pectoral fins and a small caudal fin. They have a broad mouth which is lined with several rows of teeth. The maximum published total length is 62 cm (24 in) and the maximum published weight is 3.2 kg (7.1 lb).

== Distribution and habitat ==
Hemitripterus americanus is found along the Atlantic Coast of North America, from Labrador in Canada to Chesapeake Bay. They are demersal fish found over rocky or hard substrates but can be found anywhere in the water column.

== Biology ==
Hemitripterus americanus is considered to be a voracious predator which preys on a wide variety of animals including benthic invertebrates and fish such as herring, sand lance and silver hake. When they are removed from the water they inflate and if returned to it they cannot submerge. Spawning adults attach their eggs to the bases of sponges. Sea ravens produce antifreeze proteins found in their blood that allow them to survive in subzero temperatures.
