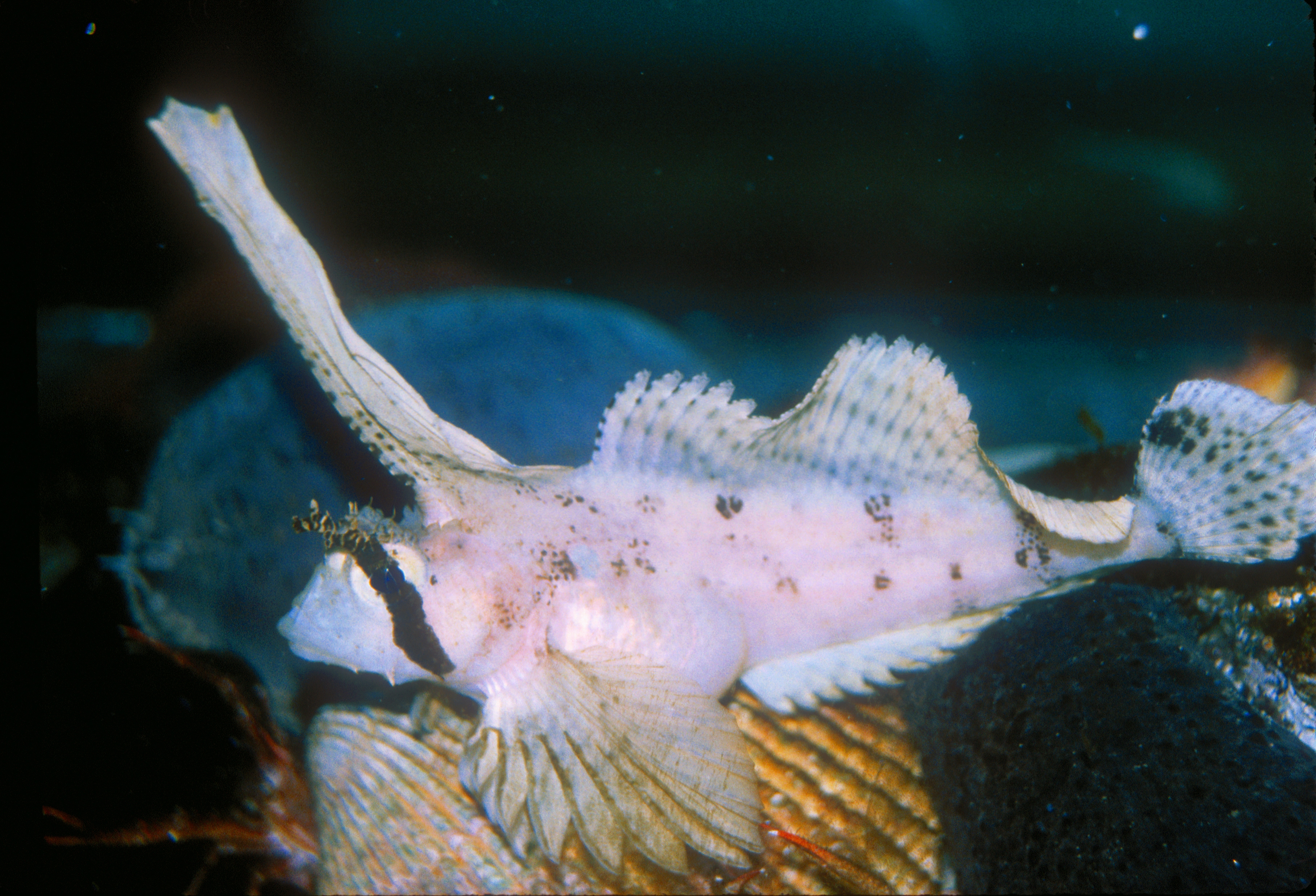

Conservation status
- Least Concern (IUCN 3.1)

Scientific classification
- Kingdom: Animalia
- Phylum: Chordata
- Class: Actinopterygii
- Order: Perciformes
- Suborder: Cottoidei
- Family: Nautichthyidae
- Genus: Nautichthys
- Species: N. oculofasciatus

Binomial name
- Nautichthys oculofasciatus (Girard, 1858)

= Sailfin sculpin =

Species of fish

The sailfin sculpin (Nautichthys oculofasciatus, lit. "eye-banded sailor fish") is a species of marine ray-finned fish belonging to the subfamily Hemitripterinae of the family Agonidae. This sculpin is found in the eastern Pacific Ocean from St. Lawrence Island, Alaska to San Miguel Island off southern California. Named for its elongated, sail-like first dorsal fin, the sailfin sculpin is a popular subject of public aquaria; it is of no interest to commercial fishery.

== Description ==
Of the typical cottoid body plan, the sailfin sculpin is noted for its conspicuous first dorsal fin dominated by the first four spines, of approximately equal length. The overall body colour is variable, from yellow-brown to yellow-gray; darker bands on the body and red flecks and diagonal streaks may be present on the fins. A distinct, dark band runs through the eye. Maximum recorded length for the species is 20 cm. Highly modified ctenoid scales give the skin a velvety texture.

According to FishBase, a variant of sailfin sculpin occurs in Knight Inlet, British Columbia: the 'sail' of the first dorsal fin is described as appearing "frail" and "more like a mast," and is dominated by the II, III, and I spines rather than the first four spines.

== Ecology ==
The sailfin sculpin is a demersal species, swimming along the bottom with its distinctive dorsal fin held erect and extended forward. N. oculofasciatus inhabits rocky coastal waters to ~110 metres where algae growth is plentiful. Being nocturnally active, it may be found sheltering upside down against crevice roofs during the day. The zoobenthos constitutes the sailfin sculpin's primary prey, especially crab and other crustaceans.

During late winter to early spring, the sailfin sculpin migrates into the shallower intertidal zone to spawn. The egg mass is orange, and adheres to the bottom. Individuals are sexually mature after one year.
