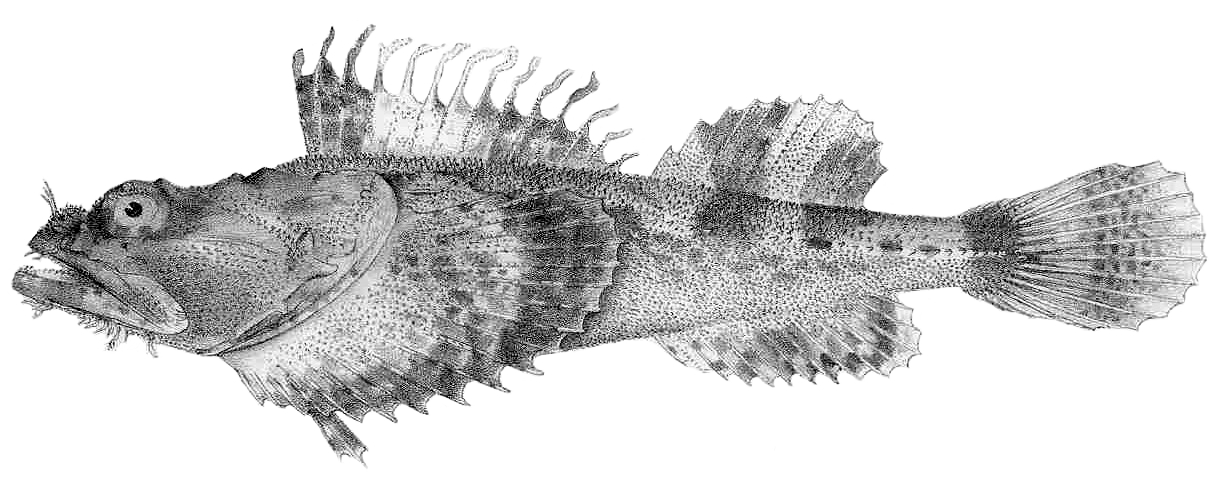

Scientific classification
- Kingdom: Animalia
- Phylum: Chordata
- Class: Actinopterygii
- Order: Perciformes
- Suborder: Cottoidei
- Family: Agonidae
- Genus: Hemitripterus
- Species: H. bolini

Binomial name
- Hemitripterus bolini (Myers, 1934)

Synonyms
- Ulca bolini Myers, 1934; Hemitripterus marmoratus Bean, 1890; Ulca marmorata (Bean, 1890)

= Bigmouth sculpin =

Species of fish

The bigmouth sculpin (Hemitripterus bolini) is a species of marine ray-finned fish belonging to the subfamily Hemitripterinae of the family Agonidae. This species is found in the northern Pacific Ocean from the Bering Sea and the Aleutian Islands south as far as Eureka, California.
