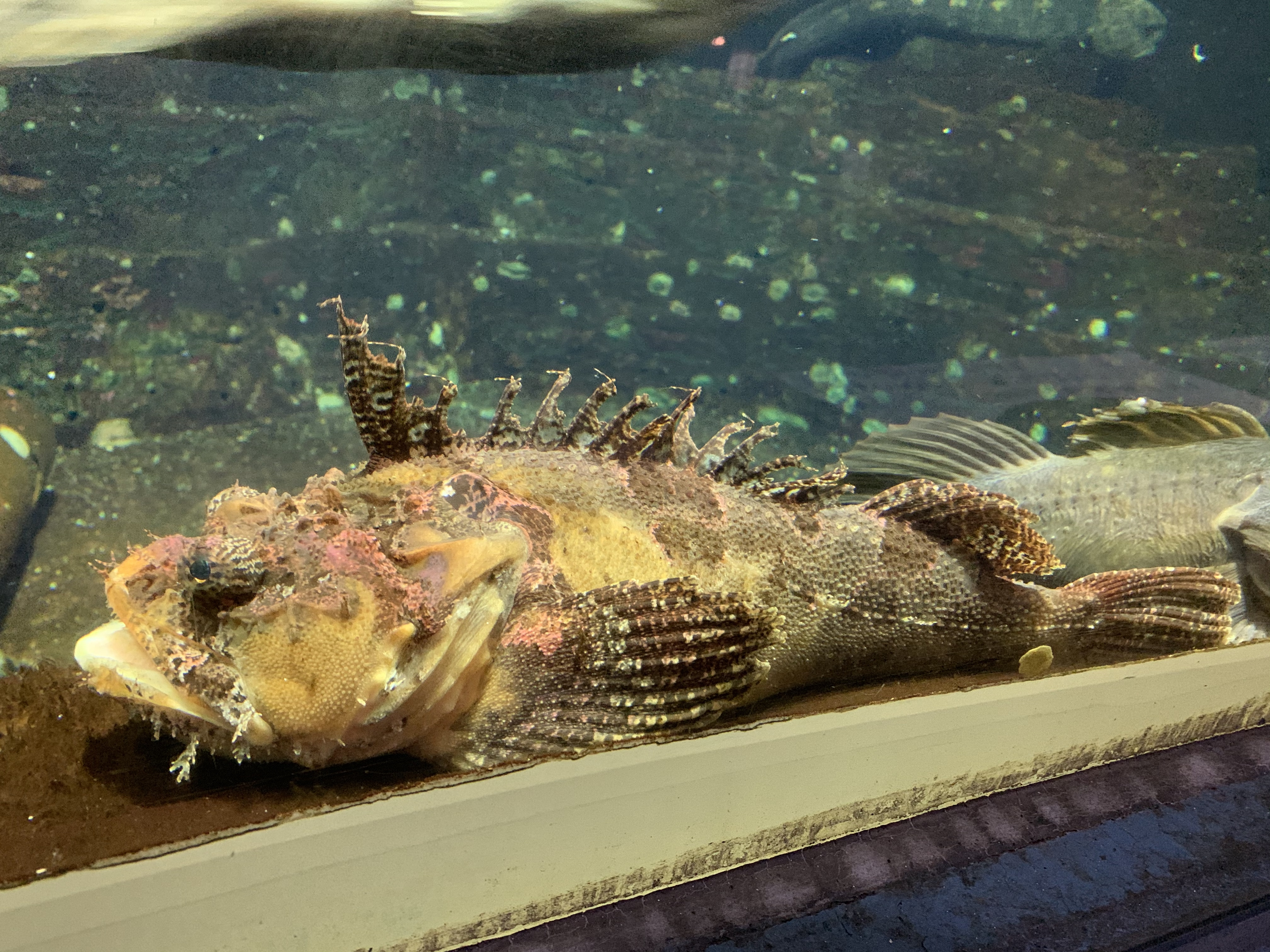

Scientific classification
- Kingdom: Animalia
- Phylum: Chordata
- Class: Actinopterygii
- Order: Perciformes
- Suborder: Cottoidei
- Family: Agonidae
- Genus: Hemitripterus
- Species: H. villosus

Binomial name
- Hemitripterus villosus (Pallas, 1814)

Synonyms
- Cottus villosus Pallas, 1814; Hemitripterus sinensis Sauvage, 1873; Hemitripterus cavifrons Lockington, 1880

= Hemitripterus villosus =

Species of fish

Hemitripterus villosus, the sea raven, is a species of marine ray-finned fish belonging to the subfamily Hemitripterinae of the family Agonidae. The sea raven is found in the northwestern Pacific Ocean off the coast of Russia and Japan.
