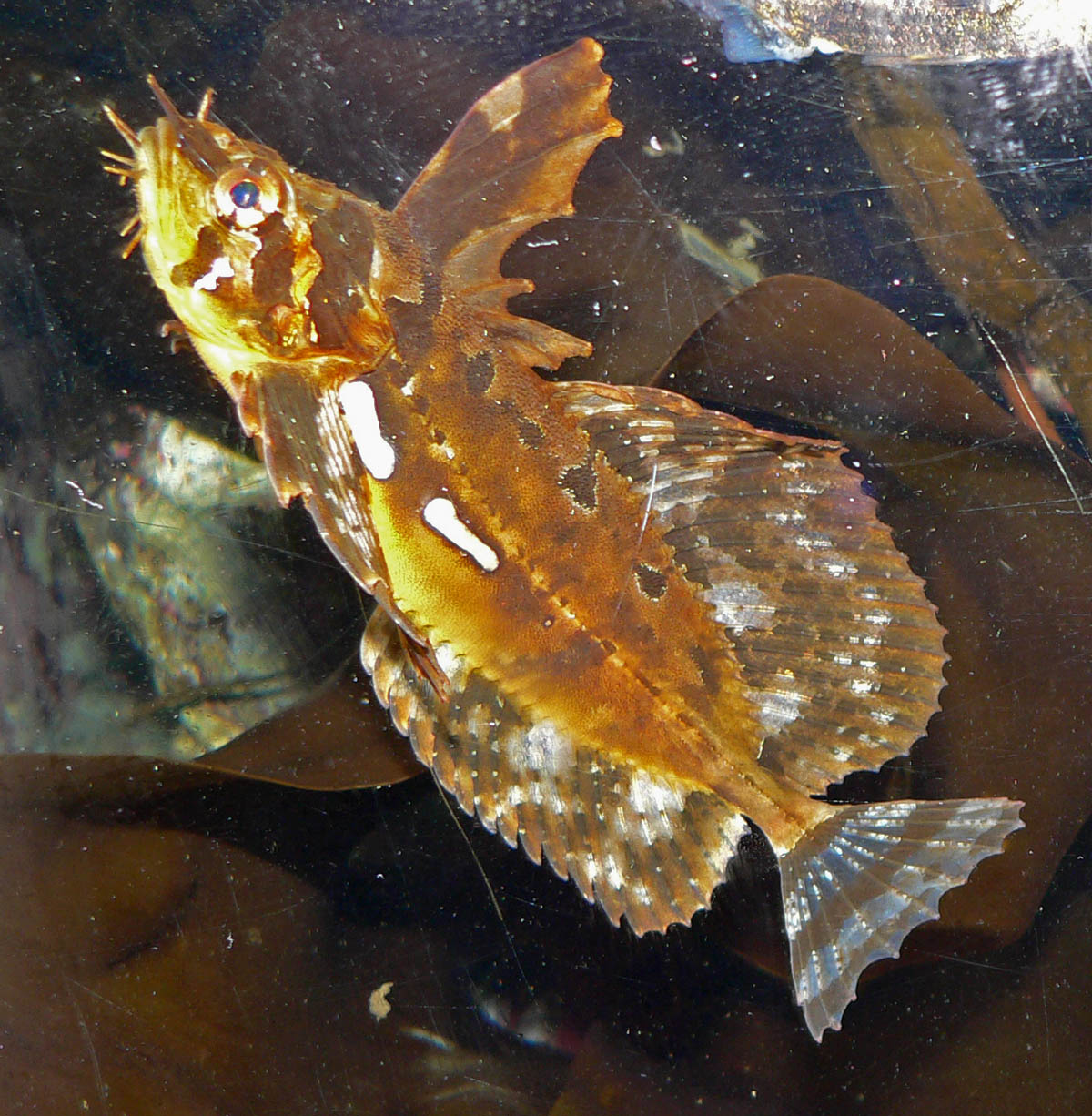

Conservation status
- Least Concern (IUCN 3.1)

Scientific classification
- Kingdom: Animalia
- Phylum: Chordata
- Class: Actinopterygii
- Division: Teleostei
- Order: Perciformes
- Suborder: Cottoidei
- Family: Hemitripteridae
- Genus: Blepsias
- Species: B. cirrhosus

Binomial name
- Blepsias cirrhosus (Pallas, 1814)

Synonyms
- Blepsias draciscus Jordan & Starks, 1904; Blepsias trilobus Cuvier, 1829; Trachinus cirrhosus Pallas, 1814

= Blepsias cirrhosus =

Species of fish

Blepsias cirrhosus, the silverspotted sculpin, is a species of sculpin belonging to the subfamily Hemitripterinae of the family Agonidae. This species is found the northern Pacific Ocean from the Sea of Japan and Alaska to San Miguel Island off southern California.

== Taxonomy ==
Blepsias cirrhosus was first formally described as Trachinus cirrhosus by the German naturalist Peter Simon Pallas with they type locality given as "America; port of Avacha, southeastern Kamchatka; Penzhinskaya Bay, Okhotsk Sea". In 1829 Georges Cuvier proposed the monospecific genus Blepsias for T. cirrhosus so it is the type species of that genus.

The specific name cirrhosus means "curled" or "bearing tendrils", an allusion to the elongated, whiskery barbels on the snout and chin.

== Distribution and habitat ==
Blepsias cirrhosus is found in the North Pacific Ocean which has a range which extends from the Sea of Japan north to the Bering Sea and south along the western coast of North America as far as San Simeon in central California. It is a demersal fish found at depths of 0 to 150 m (0 to 492 ft) in intertidal, and more commonly subtidal areas, typically no deeper than 37 m (121 ft). They are frequently found among algae.

== Description ==
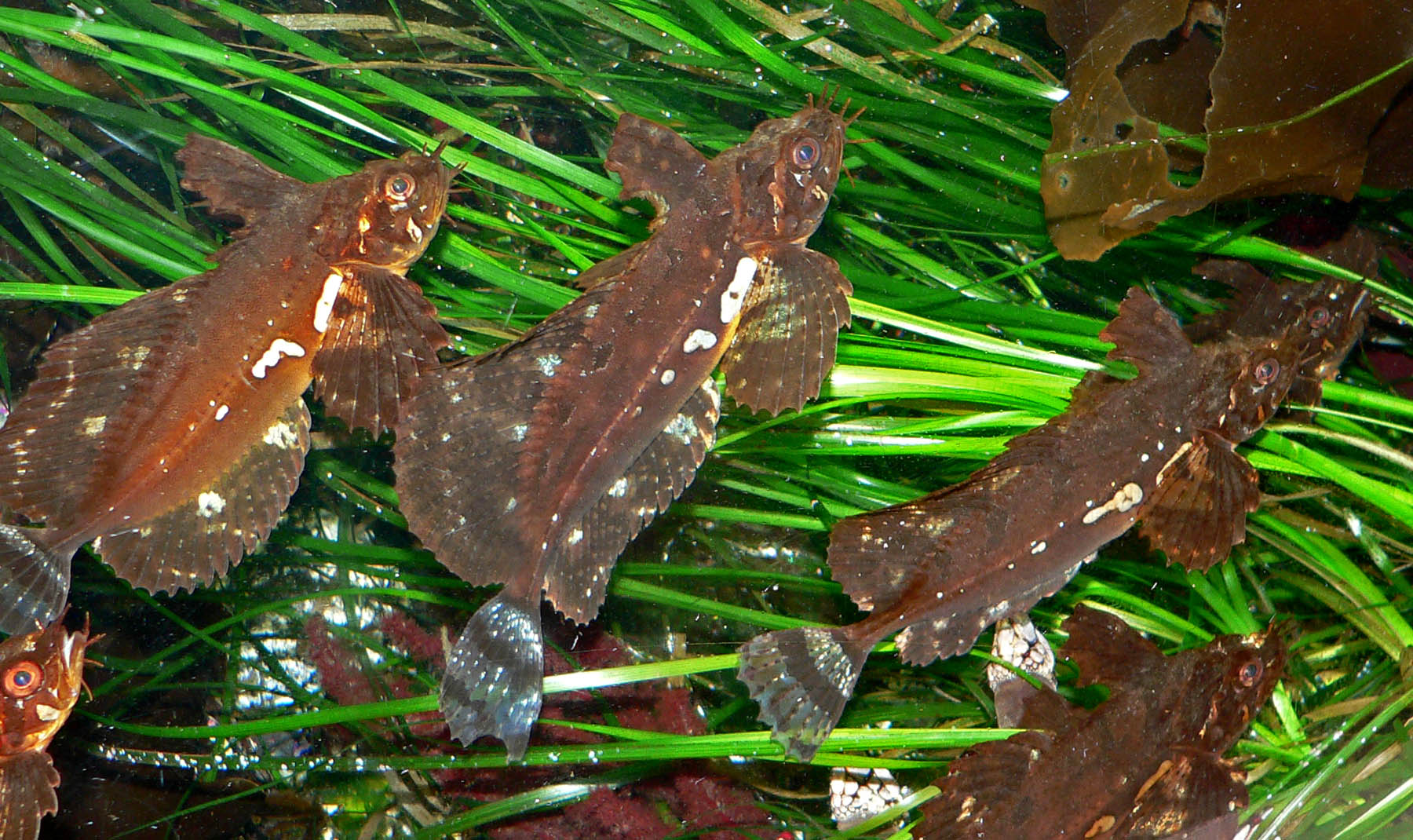
At the Vancouver Aquarium

The maximum published standard length is 20 cm (7.9 in). Blepsias cirrhosus has a deep, compressed body which is covered in papillae which enclose a small spine that is embedded in a bony plate in the skin. There are cirrhi on the chin. The first dorsal fin is notched and the second dorsal fin and the anal fin are large and are located opposite each other. There are between 6 and 9 spines in the dorsal fin and 20 to 25 soft rays while the anal fin has 18 to 21 soft rays. The pectoral fin contains between 11 and 13 rays and the small pelvic fin has 3 soft rays. The caudal fin is rounded.

The color is brownish to greenish on the upper body with dark blotches on the back, this changes to reddish or yellowish ventrally. There are white spots on the flanks near the pectoral fin. The fins are brown or black with sizeable clear patches.

== Biology ==
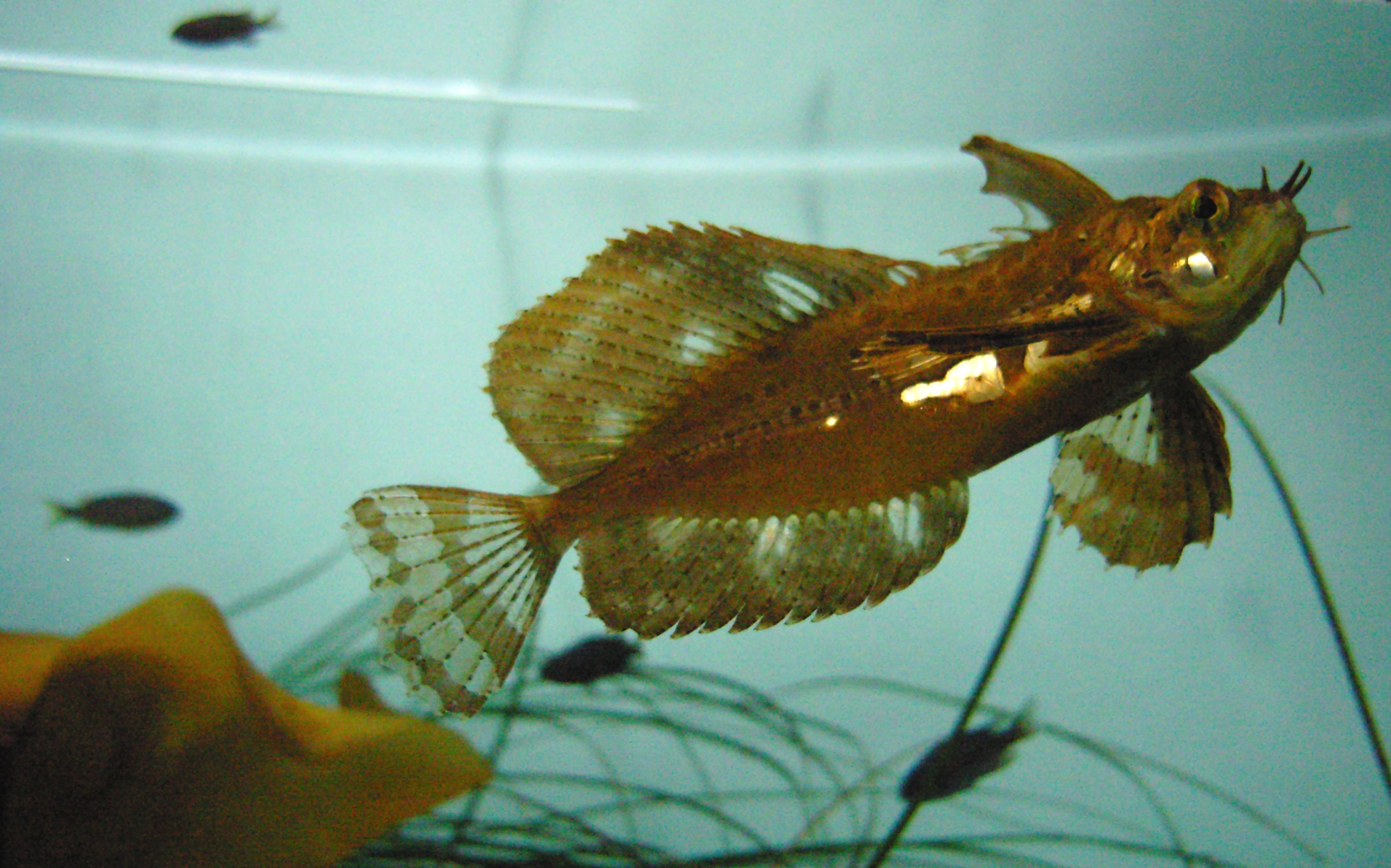
At the Monterey Bay Aquarium

Blepsias cirrhosus has external fertilization, although insemination occurs internally the eggs are then injected into a sponge, in the tissue near to the gastral cavity. The silverspotted sculpin exhibits a preying behavior of overrunning its prey, by rapidly accelerating just prior to capture, which it shares with other pelagic species such as largemouth bass (Micropterus salmoides). This differs from other sculpin species that reside near the shore, such as the tidepool sculpin (Oligocottus maculosus) that instead decelerate during prey capture.
