= Lirosceles =

Lirosceles Temporal range: Tortonian

Scientific classification
- Kingdom: Animalia
- Phylum: Chordata
- Class: Actinopterygii
- Division: Teleostei
- Order: Perciformes
- Suborder: Cottoidei
- Superfamily: Cottoidea
- Genus: †Lirosceles; Jordan, 1925
- Species: †L. elegans

Binomial name
- †Lirosceles elegans Jordan, 1925

Extinct genus of fishes

Lirosceles is an extinct genus of prehistoric sculpin that lived during the Upper Miocene subepoch. It contains a single species, L. elegans, known from the Tortonian-aged Monterey Formation of California.

Originally described within the surfperches, later studies identified it as being a sculpin, making it one of the few sculpins known from the fossil record. However, the only known fossil specimen is poorly preserved, and thus its exact taxonomic affinities are uncertain.

== See also ==
- Prehistoric fish
- List of prehistoric bony fish
