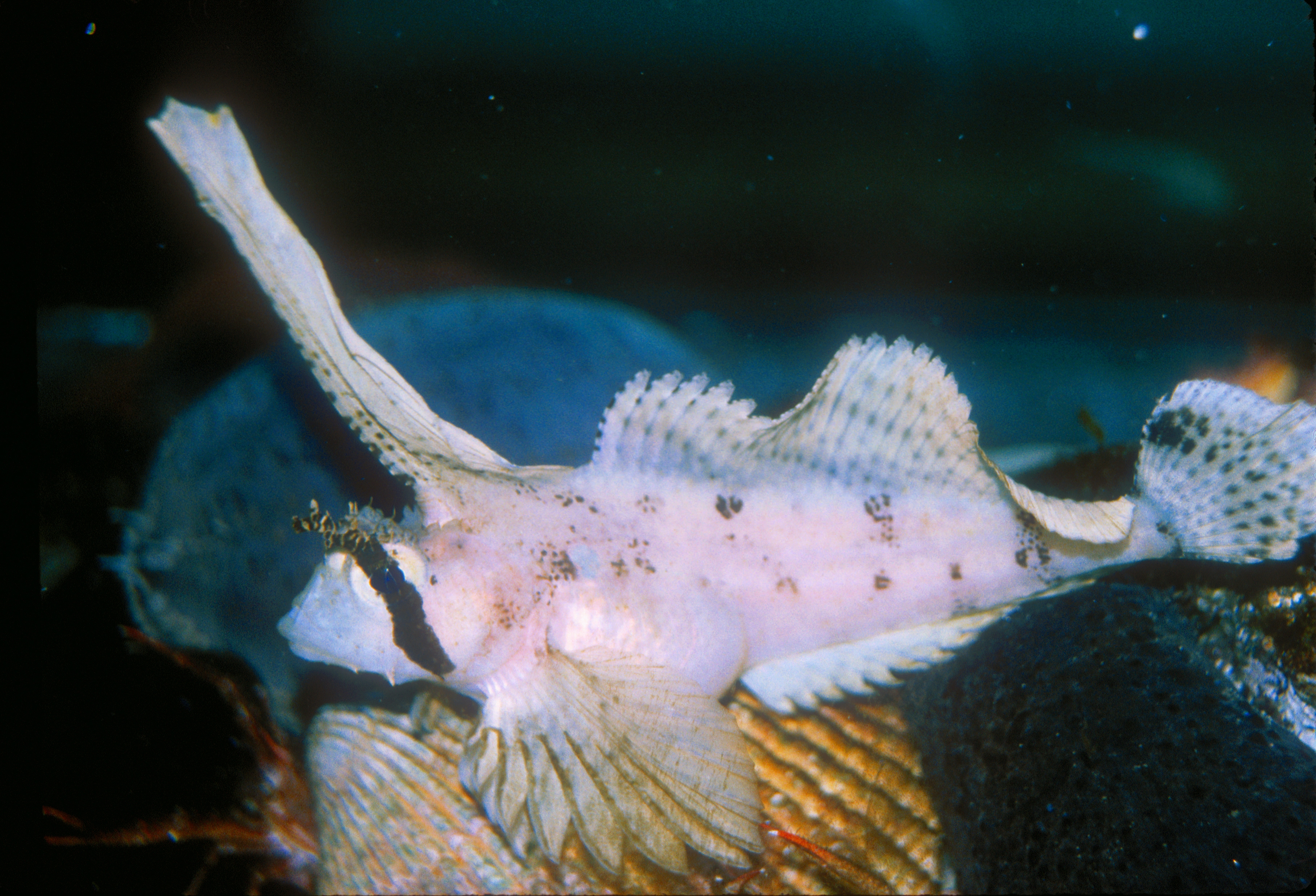
- Sailfin sculpin (N. oculofasciatus)

Scientific classification
- Kingdom: Animalia
- Phylum: Chordata
- Class: Actinopterygii
- Order: Perciformes
- Suborder: Cottoidei
- Family: Nautichthyidae; Taranetz, 1941
- Genus: Nautichthys; Girard, 1858

Type species
- Blepsias oculofasciatus Girard, 1858

Synonyms
- Nautiscus Jordan & Evermann, 1898

= Nautichthys =

Genus of fishes

Nautichthys is a genus of marine ray-finned fishes. They are the only members of the family Nautichthyidae, the sailfin sculpins. These fishes are found in the North Pacific Ocean.

They were previously placed in the subfamily Hemitripterinae which is part of the family Agonidae, but a 2026 study found it to form a distinct clade together with Hemilepidotus and Hemitripteridae, and morphologically distinct enough to deserve its own family.

== Species ==
There are currently three recognized species in this genus:

- Nautichthys oculofasciatus (Girard, 1858) (Sailfin sculpin)
- Nautichthys pribilovius (D. S. Jordan & C. H. Gilbert, 1898) (Eyeshade sculpin)
- Nautichthys robustus (Peden, 1970) (Shortmast sculpin)
