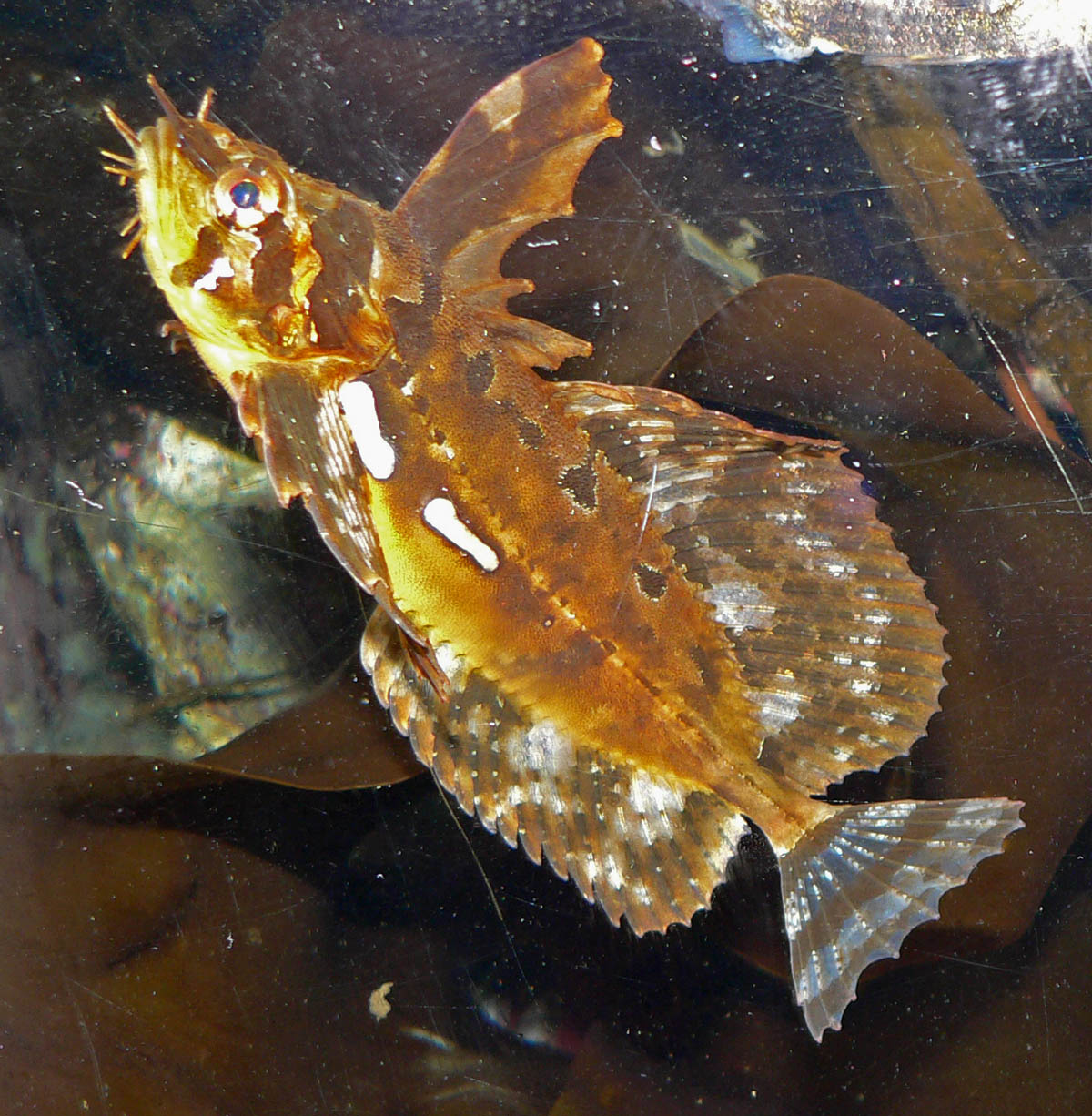
- Silverspotted sculpin, Blepsias cirrhosus

Scientific classification
- Kingdom: Animalia
- Phylum: Chordata
- Class: Actinopterygii
- Order: Perciformes
- Suborder: Cottoidei
- Superfamily: Cottoidea
- Family: Hemitripteridae; T. N. Gill, 1872

Genera
- see text

= Hemitripteridae =

Hemitripteridae Temporal range: Middle Miocene to present

Family of fishes

The Hemitripteridae is a family of the perciform clade Cottoidei, known as sea ravens. They are bottom-dwelling fish that feed on small invertebrates, found in the northwest Atlantic and north Pacific Oceans. They are covered in small spines (modified scales).

== Taxonomy ==
The sea raven subfamily Hemitripterinae was first proposed as a taxonomic grouping in 1872 by the American biologist Theodore Gill. It was later treated as a family, the Hemitripteridae, within the Cottoidea superfamily, but phylogenetic analyses in the 21st century placed the grouping within the family Agonidae. However, a 2026 study found it to form a distinct clade together with Hemilepidotus and Nautichthys, and morphologically distinct enough to deserve its own family.

== Genera ==
The following three genera are classified within the family Hemitripteridae:

- Blepsias Cuvier, 1829
- Hemitripterus Cuvier, 1829

The fossil genus †Hemitripterella Nazarkin, 1999 is known from the Middle Miocene of Sakhalin, Russia.

== Characteristics ==
Hemitripterid species are called sea ravens because early zoologists posited that their large pectoral fins may be used to fly in the air. Another name is sailfin sculpins, referring to their tall dorsal fins, in particular the very tall first dorsal fin of Nautichthys oculofasciatus. Their head and body are clothed with tiny "prickles", these being modified, platelike scales each having one spine which is covered in skin. The frontoparietal ridge is knobby. The preoperculum has 3 or 4 spines which are mainly blunt and covered in skin. There are two dorsal fins, the first is supported by between 6 and 19 spines, the second by 11 to 30 soft rays. there are between 11 and 22 soft rays supporting the anal fin and the pectoral fin has a single spine and 3 soft rays. The lateral line canal is complete and contains more than 35 pores. They have both vomerine and palatine teeth. The gill membrane has a wide attachment to the isthmus and forms a fold across the throat. They do not have a swim bladder, In some species the males have external genital papilla. They have bands and other markings but the coloration can vary with habitat. They vary in maximum size from a total length of 8 cm (3.1 in) in the shortmast sculpin (Nautichthys robustus) to around 73 cm (29 in) in the bigmouth sculpin (Hemitripterus bolini).

== Distribution and habitat ==
Hemitripterid sculpins are mainly found in the North Pacific Ocean, with a single species, the sea raven (Hemitripterus americanus) being found in the northwestern Atlantic Ocean. They are marine, demersal fishes found from the intertidal zone down to in excess of 420 m (1,380 ft), although the majority of then are found in less than 200 m (660 ft). 200 m.
