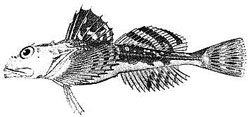
- Myoxocephalus octodecemspinosus

Scientific classification
- Kingdom: Animalia
- Phylum: Chordata
- Class: Actinopterygii
- Division: Teleostei
- Order: Perciformes
- Suborder: Cottoidei
- Superfamily: Cottoidea; Gill, 1889

= Sculpin =

Sculpin Temporal range: Early Eocene–present

Fish of the superfamily Cottoidea

A sculpin is a type of fish that belongs to the superfamily Cottoidea in the order Perciformes. As of 2025, this superfamily contains 5 families, 112 genera, and 405 species.

Sculpins occur in many types of habitat, including ocean and freshwater zones. They live in rivers, submarine canyons, kelp forests, and shallow littoral habitat types, such as tidepools.

== Families and subfamilies ==
Families include:

- Family Rhamphocottidae Jordan & Gilbert, 1883 (horsehead sculpins)
- Family Cottidae Bonaparte, 1831 (sculpins)
- Family Psychrolutidae Günther, 1861 (marine sculpins)
- Family Jordaniidae Jordan & Evermann, 1898 (longfin sculpins)
- Family Nautichthyidae Taranetz, 1941 (sailfin sculpins)
- Family Hemilepidotidae Jordan & Evermann, 1898 (Irish lords)
- Family Hemitripteridae Gill, 1865 (sea ravens)
- Family Agonidae Swainson, 1839 (Poachers and sea ravens)
  - Subfamily Hypsagoninae Gill, 1861 (dragon poachers)
  - Subfamily Agoninae Swainson, 1839 (hooknose poachers)
  - Subfamily Anoplagoninae Gill, 1861 (alligator fishes)
  - Subfamily Podothecinae Gill, 1861 (sturgeon poachers)
  - Subfamily Brachyopsinae Jordan & Evermann, 1898 (uppermouth poachers)
  - Subfamily Agonopsinae Vandenberg et al. 2026 (spearnose poachers)

In addition, two prehistoric sculpins of uncertain affinities, †Lirosceles Jordan, 1925 and potentially †Hayia Jordan & Gilbert, 1919, are known from the Late Miocene of California, USA. Both are known from poorly-preserved specimens that cannot be further taxonomically narrowed down.

== Gallery ==
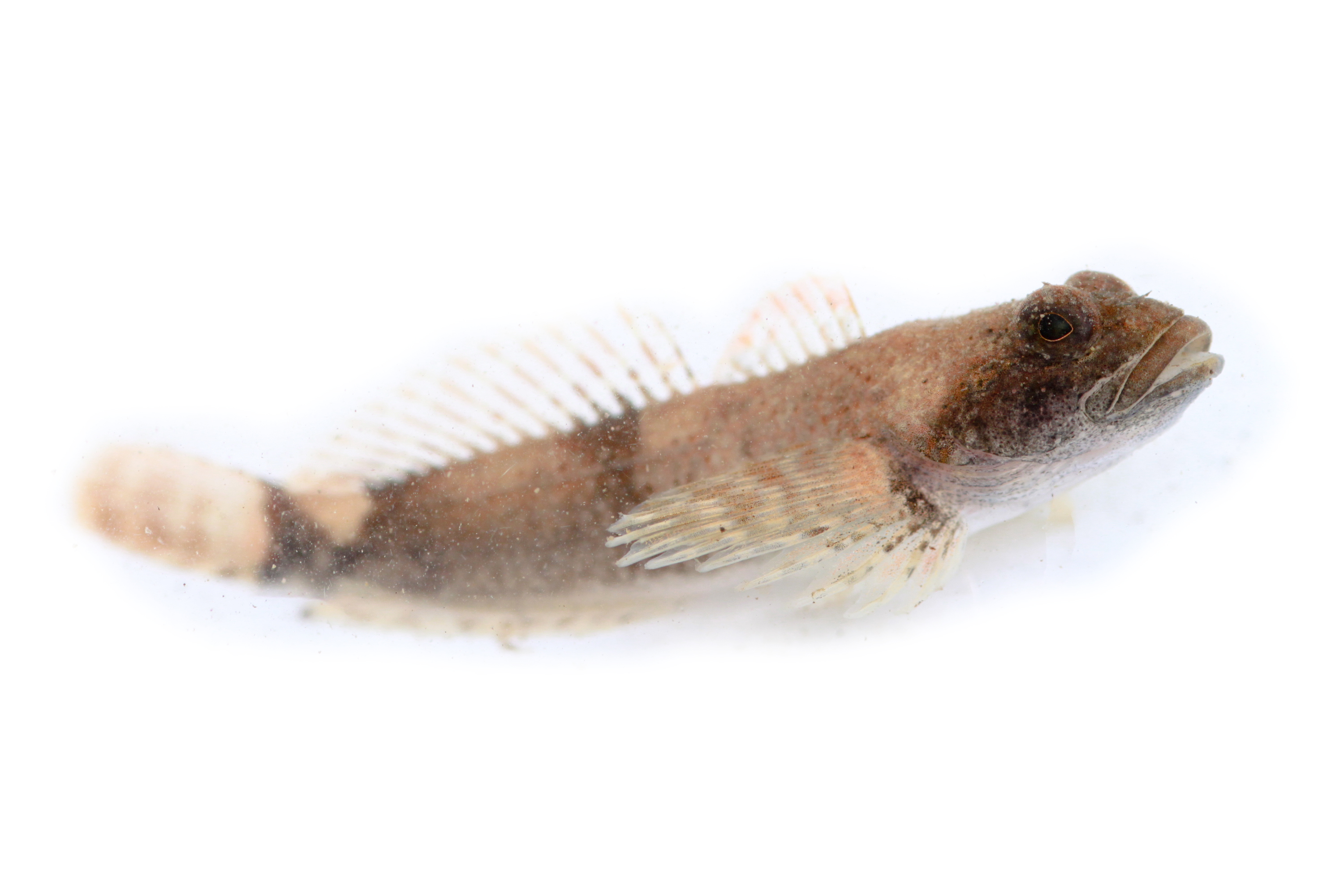
Cottus caeruleomentum

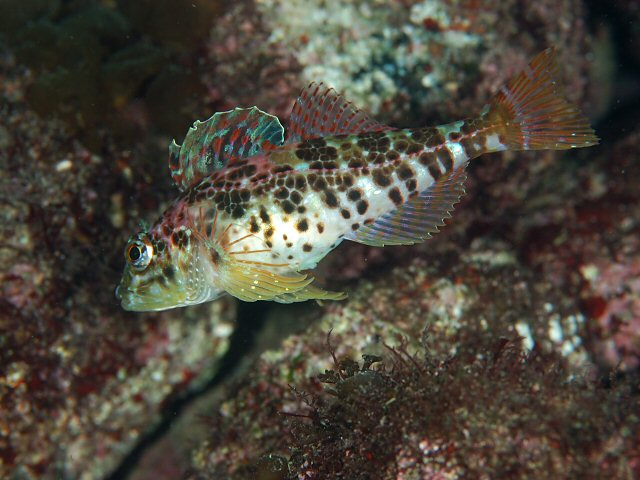
Pseudoblennius zonostigma

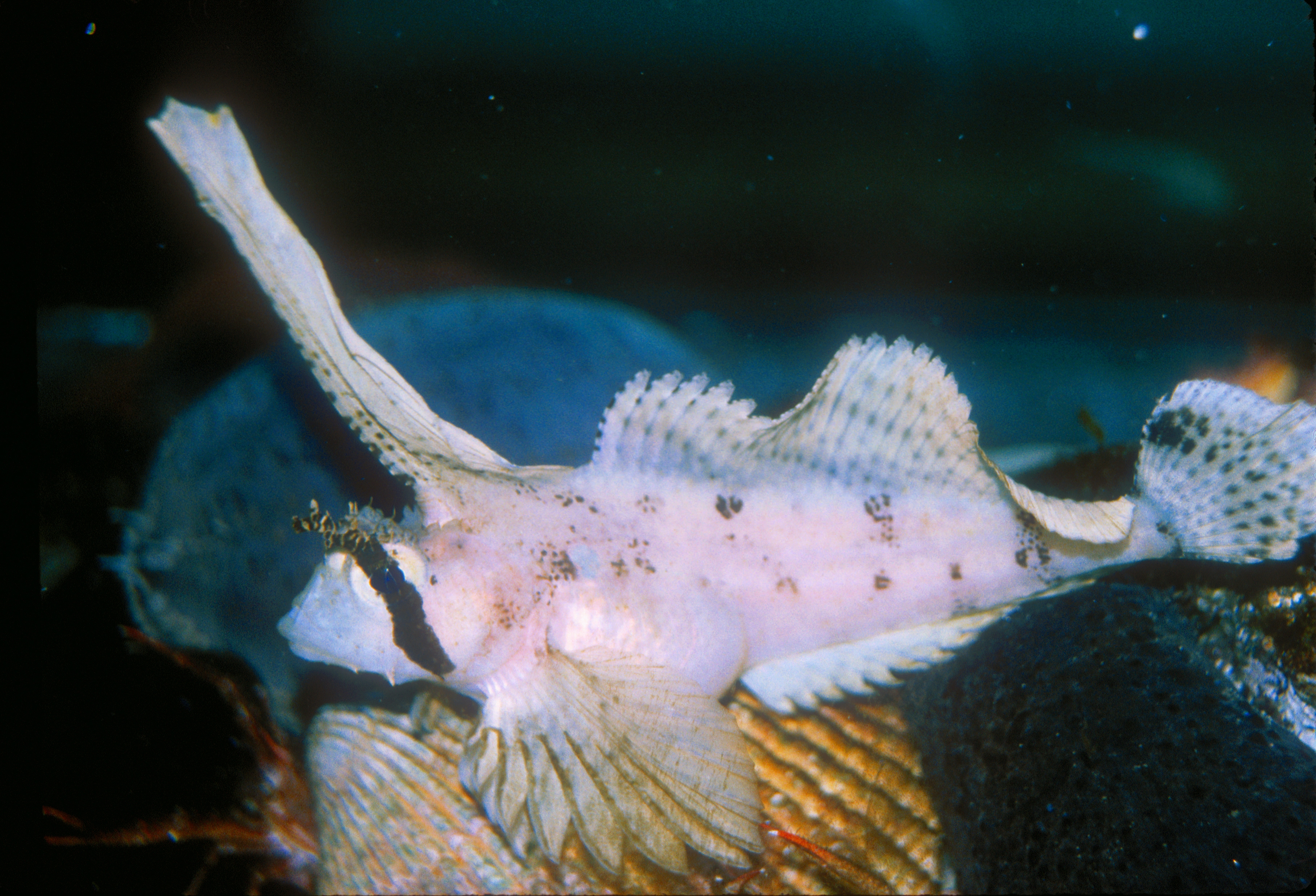
Nautichthys oculofasciatus

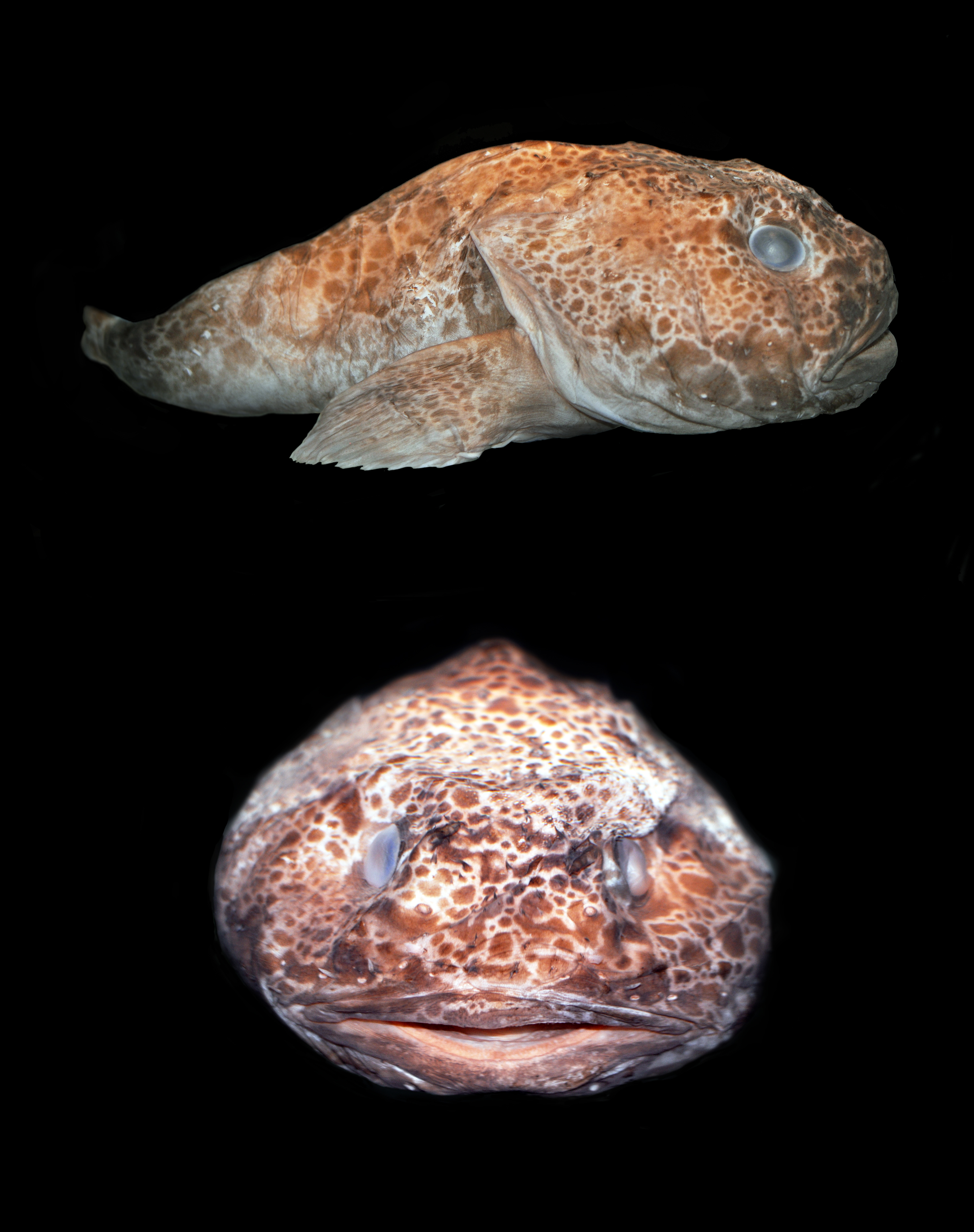
Ambophthalmos angustus
