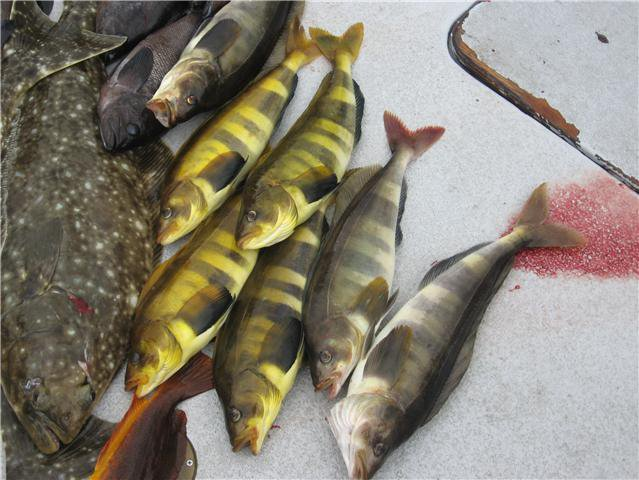
- Atka mackerel caught near Homer, Alaska, United States
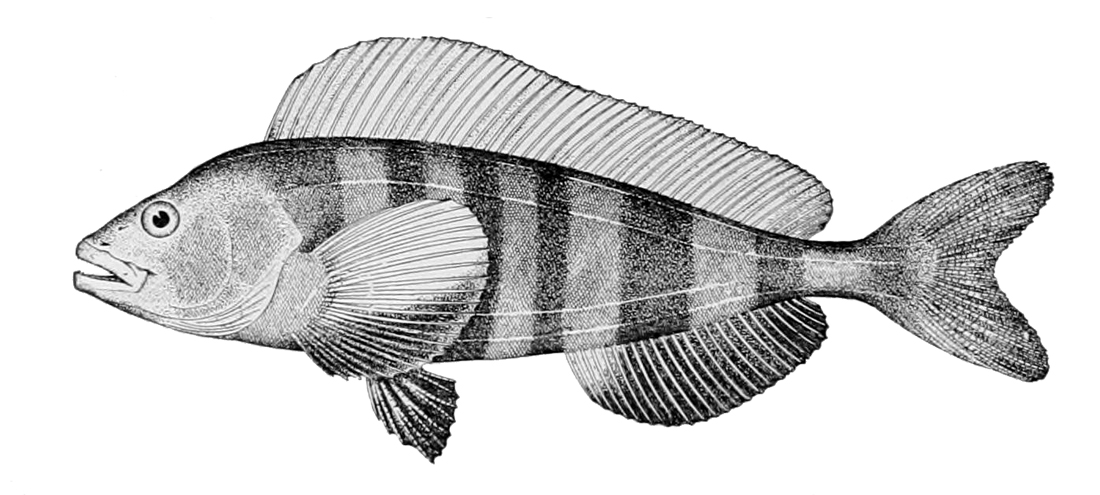

Scientific classification
- Kingdom: Animalia
- Phylum: Chordata
- Class: Actinopterygii
- Division: Teleostei
- Order: Perciformes
- Suborder: Cottoidei
- Family: Hexagrammidae
- Genus: Pleurogrammus
- Species: P. monopterygius

Binomial name
- Pleurogrammus monopterygius (Pallas, 1810)

Synonyms
- Labrax monopterygius Pallas, 1810

= Atka mackerel =

Species of fish

The Atka mackerel (Pleurogrammus monopterygius) is a species of greenling, a ray-finned fish in the family Hexagrammidae. Atka mackerel are common in the northern Pacific Ocean, and are one of only two members of the genus Pleurogrammus – the other being the Arabesque greenling (Pleurogrammus azonus). The Atka mackerel was named for Atka Island (Atx̂ax̂ in Aleut), the largest island of the Andreanof islands, a branch of the Aleutians.

== Taxonomy ==
The Atka mackerel was originally described under the genus Labrax, but has since been moved to Pleurogrammus. Both names are attributed to Peter Simon Pallas, who published his description of the fish in 1810, roughly a year before his death.

Atka mackerel were once considered to be synonymous with Arabesque greenlings. The combined species would have been called the Okhotsk Atka mackerel, a name now used only for the greenling. The two fishes are, in reality, two distinct species.

Despite its name, it is not closely related to true mackerels of the family Scombridae, in actuality, the Atka mackerel is most closely related to the lingcod and greenlings, and more distantly to sculpins and lumpfishes.

== Description ==
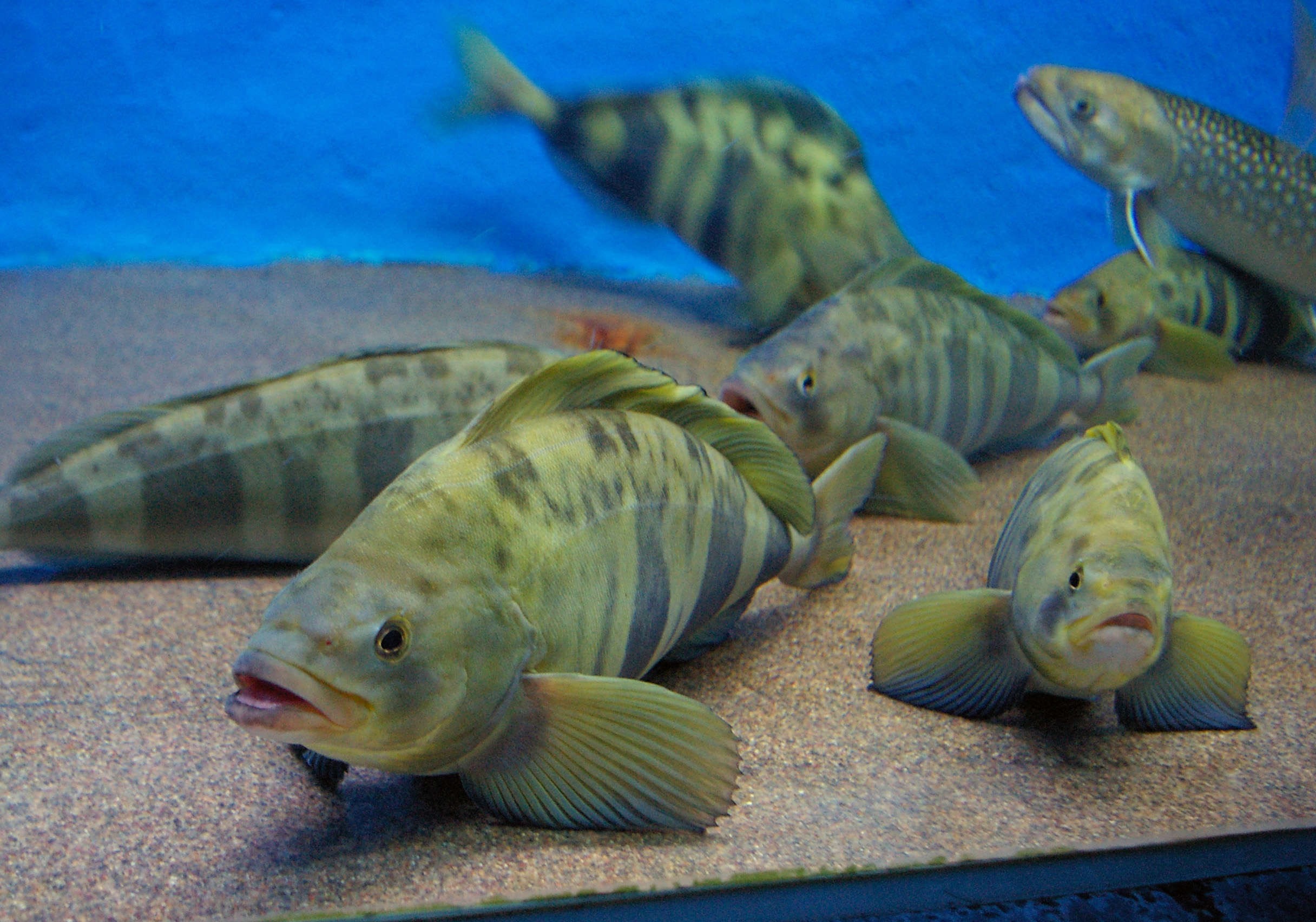
A closeup of the head and face of an Atka mackerel.

Able to live up to 14 years, the largest Atka mackerel recorded was 56.5 centimetres (22.2 in) long; the heaviest recorded weight was 2.0 kilograms (4.4 lb). Adults have five vertical, blackish bands on their bodies, which are normally yellowish. Atka mackerel can be distinguished from other, similar species by the number of spines and rays that they have on their fins. They have 21 spines, and anywhere from 25–29 rays on their dorsal fins, and only one spine (but 24–26 rays) on their anal fins.

== Distribution and habitat ==
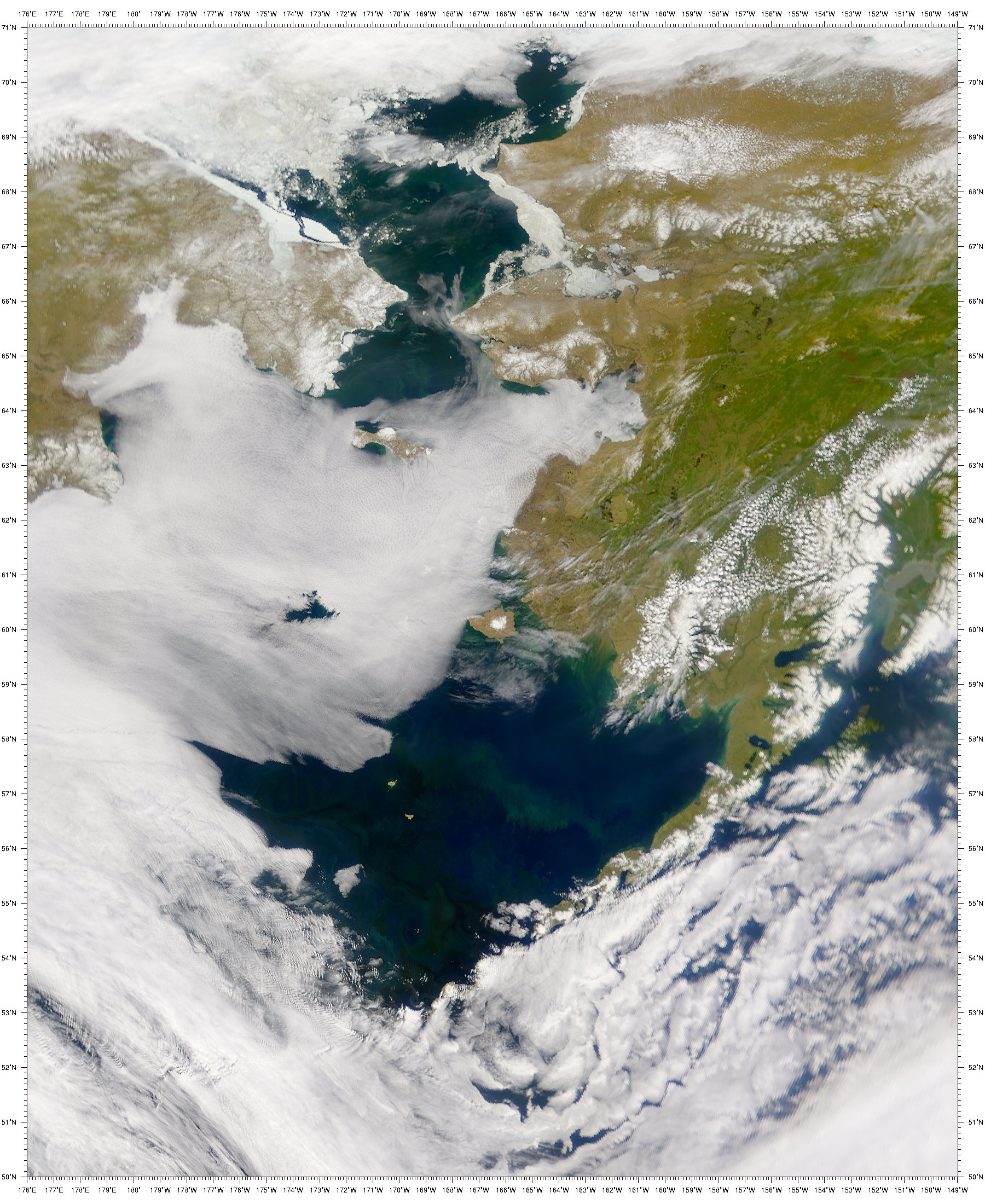
The Bering sea and Aleutian chain as seen from space

Found exclusively in the northern Pacific, Atka mackerel are known from the Sea of Japan and the waters off Hokkaido, as well as the southern Kuril Islands, and from Stalemate and Bowers Bank in the Aleutian chain to Icy bay, Alaska. They can also be rarely seen as far south as Redondo Beach, California.

Atka mackerel can generally be found from the intertidal zone to depths up to 575 metres (1,886 ft).

=== Migration and breeding ===
They migrate from shelves to coastal waters to spawn which occurs (in the Aleutians) from July to September. Their eggs adhere to crevices in the rocks, and incubate for 40–45 days. Males guard the clutches of eggs until they hatch.

== Ecology ==
The fish feed on copepods and euphausiids. They are, in turn, preyed upon by several species such as bony fishes, (coho salmon, sablefish, Polypera simushirae, Pacific cod, Pacific halibut, and Arrowtooth flounder) mammals (Steller's sea lion), birds (Thick-billed murre), and rays (the Aleutian skate, White-blotched skate, and the Alaska skate) and an important food source for birds, other fish and mammals.

== Fisheries ==
Atka mackerel are used as food in the Aleutian chain, and can be caught as game fish. American ichthyologist David Starr Jordan wrote about fishing for Atka mackerel on May 28, 1892, in American Food and Game Fishes:

The fish were in schools and it was easy to get great numbers; in fact, one would be kept very busy hauling in the fish and taking them off the hook... When first hooked they would come up very readily, in fact they seemed to swim upward until near the surface when they would become alarmed and dart back and forth in their efforts to free themselves. The sport was very exciting. During 4 hours fishing 9 persons with 26 lines took 585 fish... And as our ship was out of fresh meat of every kind, all these fish were soon eaten by the officers and crew.
