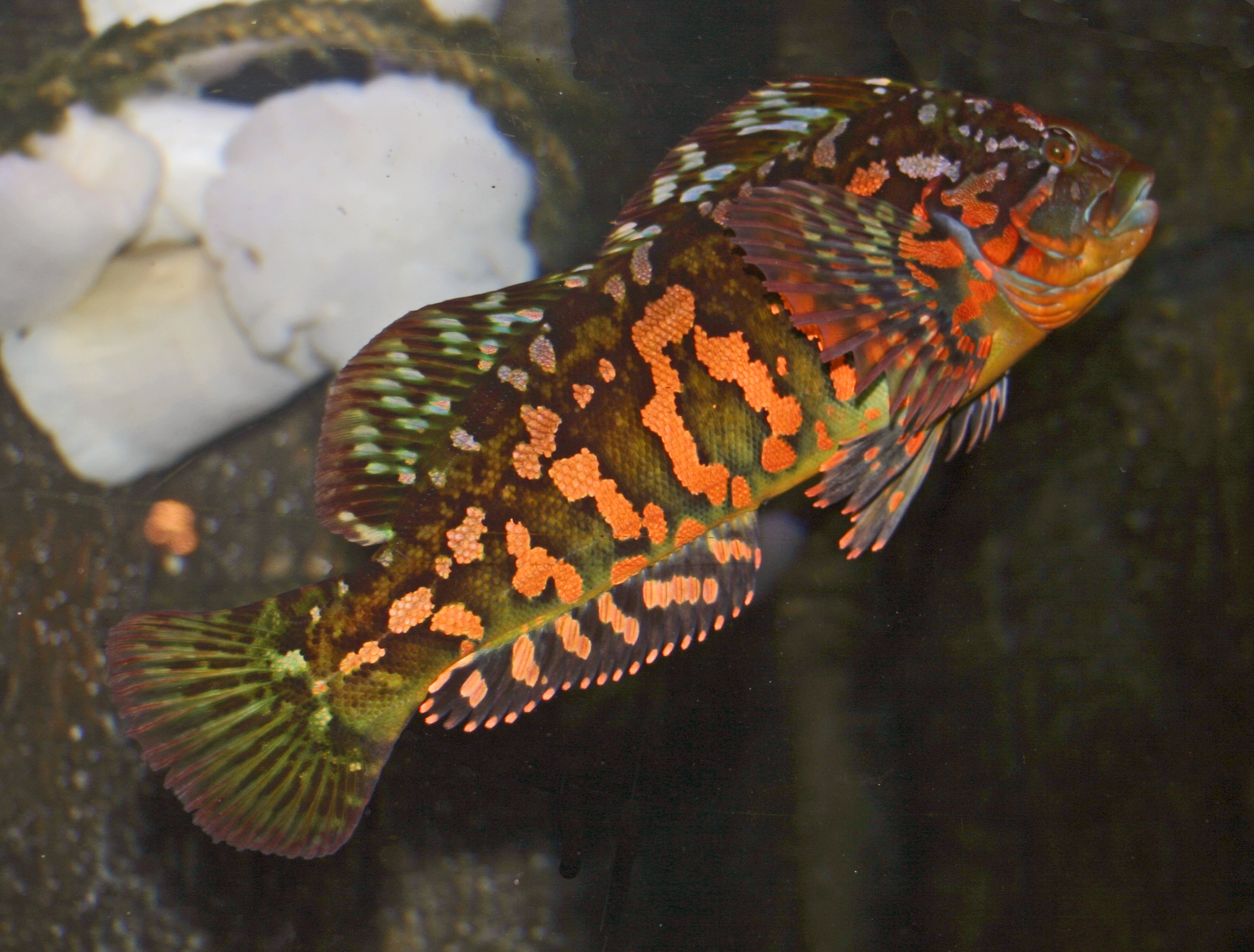

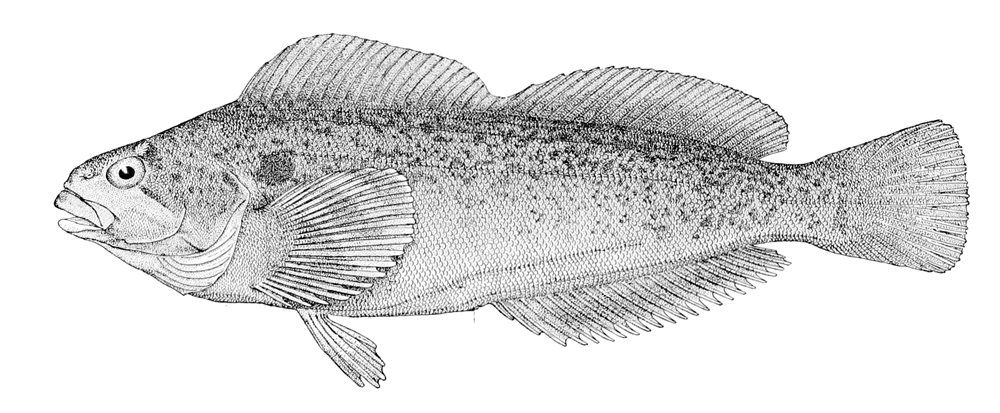

Conservation status
- Least Concern (IUCN 3.1)

Scientific classification
- Kingdom: Animalia
- Phylum: Chordata
- Class: Actinopterygii
- Division: Teleostei
- Order: Perciformes
- Suborder: Cottoidei
- Family: Hexagrammidae
- Genus: Hexagrammos
- Species: H. lagocephalus

Binomial name
- Hexagrammos lagocephalus (Pallas, 1810)

Synonyms
- List: Labrax lagocephalus Pallas, 1810; Labrax superciliosus Pallas, 1810; Hexagrammos superciliosus (Pallas, 1810); Lebius superciliosus (Pallas, 1810); Chirus pictus Girard, 1854; Chirus balias Cope, 1873; Hexagrammus scaber Bean, 1881

= Rock greenling =

Species of fish

The rock greenling (Hexagrammos lagocephalus) is a species of marine ray-finned fish belonging to the family Hexagrammidae, the greenlings. It is sometimes known as fringed greenling and erroneously as the red rock trout.

== Taxonomy ==
The rock greenling was first formally described in 1810 as Labrax lagocephalus by the German naturalist Peter Simon Pallas with its type locality given as the Kuril Islands. The specific name, lagocephalus, means "harehead", an name not explained by Pallas but may refer to the rounded, rabbit like snout.

== Range ==
The rock greenling's natural distribution is along the Pacific Coast the Kuril Islands and the Bering Sea to the coast of southern California. Its habitat of choice is rocky shoreline. Sometimes, though, they can be found in tidepools and sandy areas.

== Appearance ==
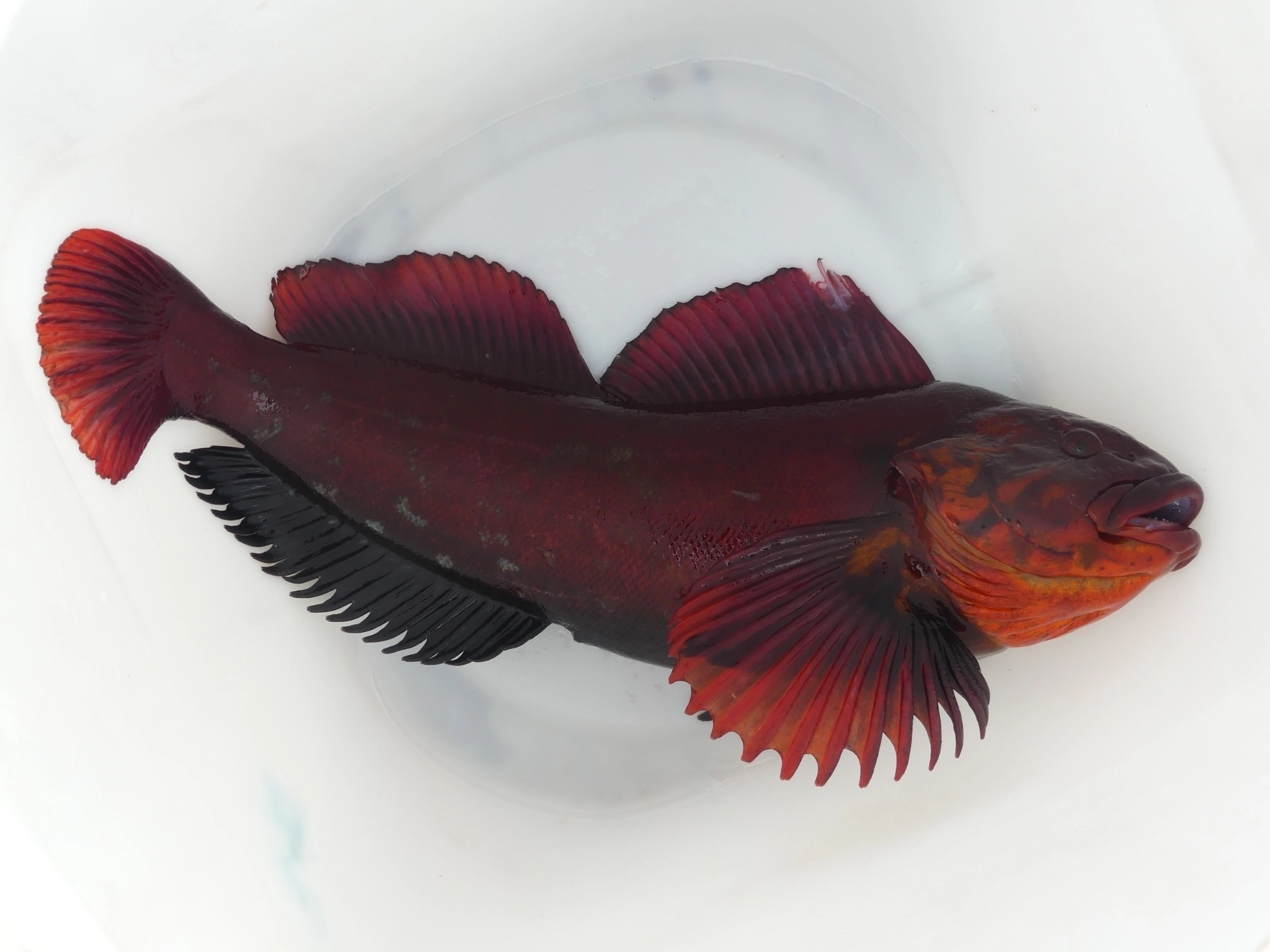
In Kamchatka, Russia

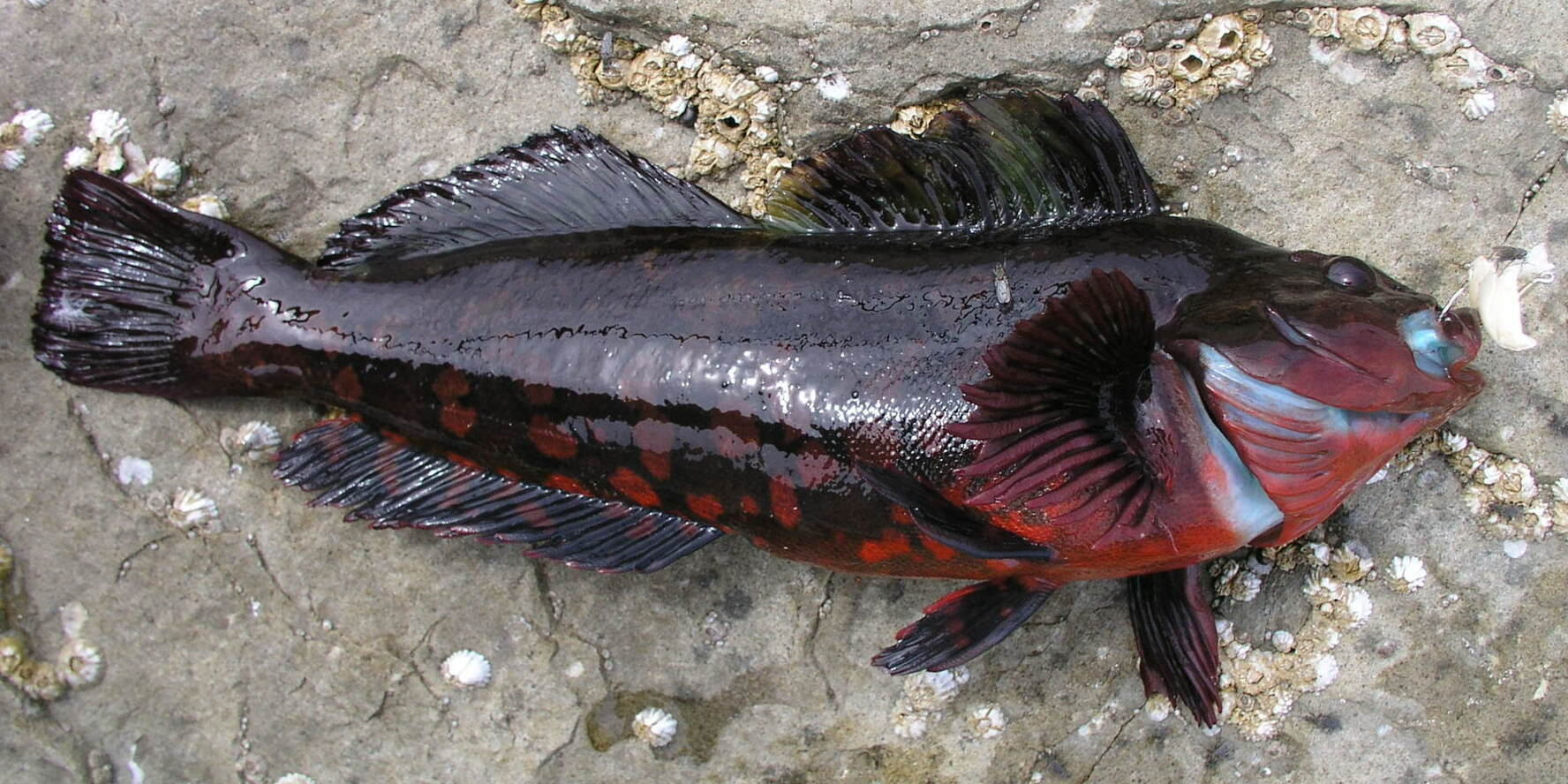
In Oregon, USA

The fish is maroon, with blue spot that fades to bright red. The color pattern helps it blend in with its natural environment. It grows to up to 24 in (60 cm) long. Most adult have blue mouths, while the young have bright red eyes. The flesh is also blue in color, but turns into white after cooked.

== Behavior ==
The species is usually solitary, but not aggressive, which has led to easy husbandry in public aquaria. It is sometimes cryptic, however, and often elusive to divers and spear fishermen, as they prefer living among the rock in the heavy surge.

== Diet ==
Hexagrammos lagocephalus is a generalized feeder, eating everything from invertebrates such as crabs and isopods to fish eggs and algae. When young, the fish eat zooplankton.

== Economic value ==
Though not commonly commercially fished like the related lingcod, they are a popular gamefish. Most live among areas impossible to fish by commercial boats. They are commonly caught by sport fishers off exposed rocky shores.
