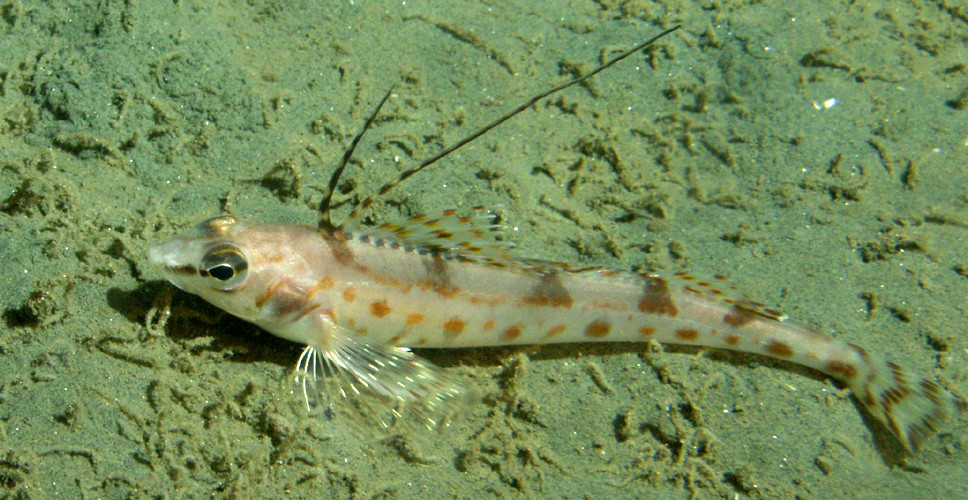

Scientific classification
- Kingdom: Animalia
- Phylum: Chordata
- Class: Actinopterygii
- Order: Perciformes
- Suborder: Cottoidei
- Family: Zaniolepididae
- Genus: Zaniolepis
- Species: Z. latipinnis

Binomial name
- Zaniolepis latipinnis Girard, 1858

= Zaniolepis latipinnis =

Species of fish

Zaniolepis latipinnis, the longspine combfish or longspined greenling, is a species of ray-finned fish belonging to the family Zaniolepididae.The species occurs in the eastern Pacific Ocean.

== Taxonomy ==
Zaniolepis latipinnis was first formally described in 1858 by the French biologist Charles Frédéric Girard with its type locality given as Fort Steilacoom on Puget Sound in Washington. Girard placed his new species in a new monospecific genus, Zaniolepis. The specific name, latipinnis, means "broad-finned", a reference to the long bases of the dorsal and anal fins.

== Description ==
Zaniolepis latipinnis has a slender, elongated and compressed body which is covered in small, rough scales. The head is of moderate length with a small terminal mouth and eyes that are positioned high on the head. There are 21 or 22 spines in the first dorsal fin, the first 3 spines being very elongated, with 11 or 12 soft rays in the second dorsal fin. The anal fin has 3 spines and between 15 and 17 soft rays. The overall colour is tan or pinkish, broken by ill-defined markings, fading to white on the underside. There is a row of saddle-like markings along the back and a variety of spots and blotches on the flanks with a broad black stripe running from to the eye. The dorsal fin has dark bands, the long anal fin has a white margin and a black stripe. This species has a maximum published total length of 30 cm (12 in).

== Distribution and habitat ==
Zaniolepis latipinnis Is found in the eastern Pacific Ocean from Vancouver Island in British Columbia south to just north of Magdalena Bay in Baja California Sur. This is a demersal fish found at depths between 37 and 201 m (121 and 659 ft) found over muddy and mixed pebble bottoms.

== Biology ==
Zaniolepis latipinnis feeds on invertebrates such as polychaetes and smaller crustaceans, as well as the eggs of fishes. They are known prey items for seabirds, sea lions and larger fishes. The females spawn in batches, three batches of around 6,500 eggs are laid in a year.
