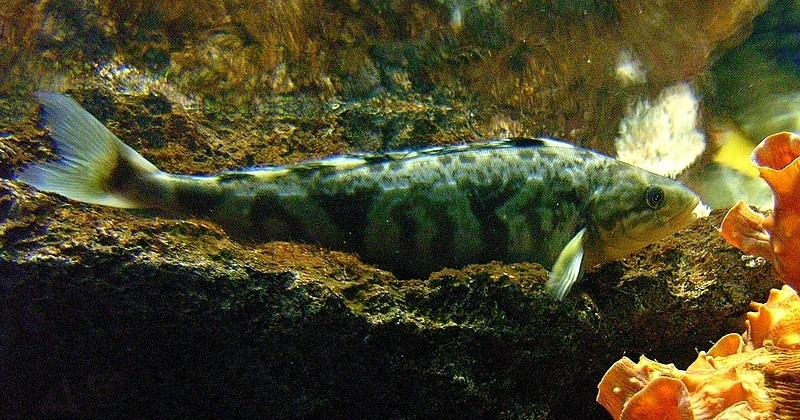
- P. azonus in a tank
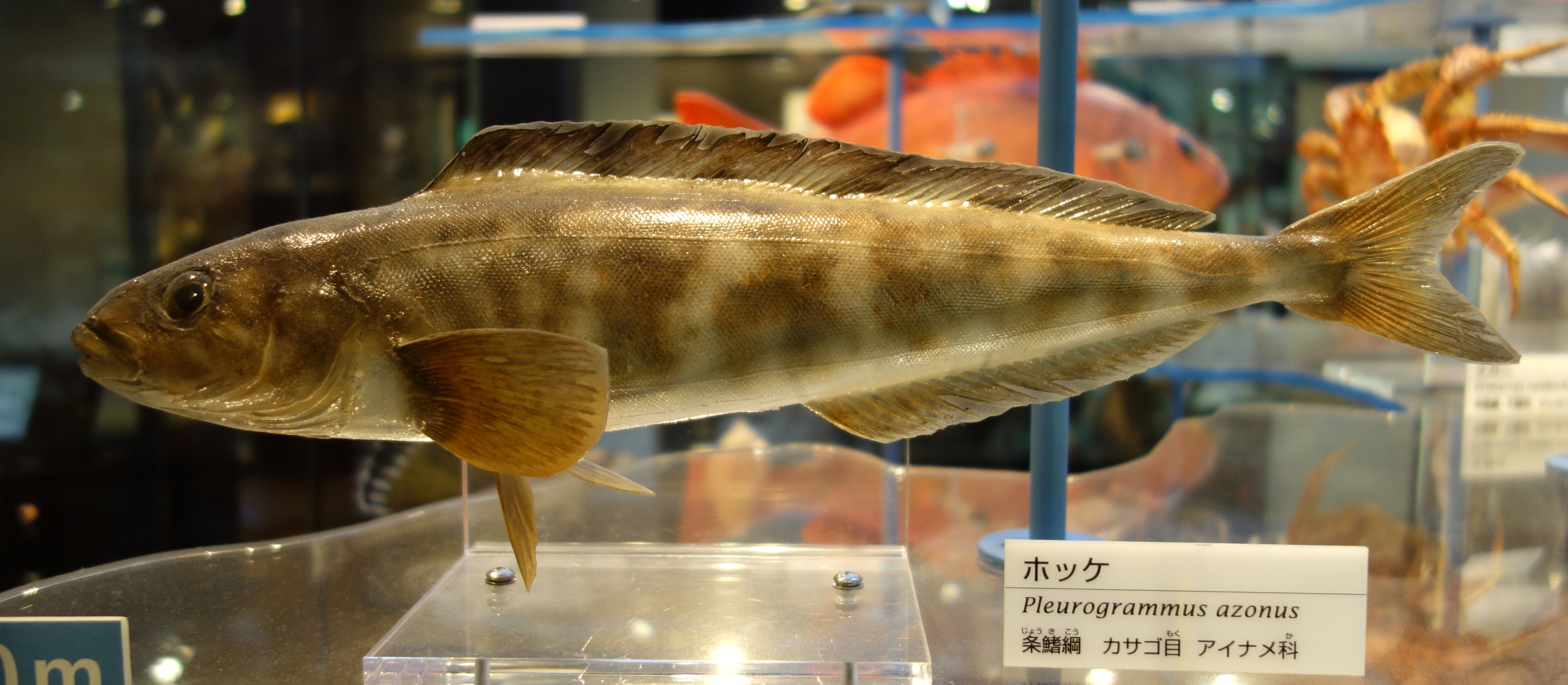

Scientific classification
- Kingdom: Animalia
- Phylum: Chordata
- Class: Actinopterygii
- Order: Perciformes
- Suborder: Cottoidei
- Family: Hexagrammidae
- Genus: Pleurogrammus
- Species: P. azonus

Binomial name
- Pleurogrammus azonus D. S. Jordan & Metz, 1913

Synonyms
- Stellistius katsukii Jordan & Tanaka, 1927

= Okhotsk atka mackerel =

Species of fish

The Okhotsk Atka mackerel (Pleurogrammus azonus), also known as the Arabesque greenling, is a mackerel-like species in the family Hexagrammidae. It is commonly known as hokke (ホッケ) in Japan and imyeonsu in Korean. The primary population of the fish is found off the Sea of Okhotsk.

== History ==
According to legend, it was discovered by the monk Nichiji.

== Distribution and habitat ==
The Okhotsk Atka mackerel is found in the northwest Pacific Ocean occurring in Primorskii Krai in Russia, the Sea of Okhotsk east to the Kuril Islands south to Ibaraki Prefecture and Tsushima in Japan and the Yellow Sea. It is an oceanodromous, demersal fish found at depths from the surface to 240 m (790 ft).

== Taxonomy ==
The Okhotsk atka mackerel was first formally described in 1913 by the American ichthyologists David Starr Jordan and Charles William Metz with its type locality given as Nampo in North Korea. This species is occasionally considered synonymous with the Atka mackerel, P. monopterygius (Nelson 1994). However, it is probably a separate species. This fish was also documented as Stellistius katsukii but the older name Pleurogrammus azonus takes precedence.

== Biology ==
The juvenile Okhotsk atka mackerel gather in large schools close the surface but the adults are benthic. The females lay egg masses within crevices or in gravel along rocky coasts at depths of less than 20 m (66 ft), these are guarded by the males.

== Fisheries ==
Global capture production of Okhotsk atka mackerel (Pleurogrammus azonus) in thousand tonnes from 1950 to 2022, as reported by the FAO

The Okhotsk atka mackerel is an important fish, and approximately 100,000 tons of the species were harvested each year throughout the late 20th century.

== As food ==
Known in Japanese cuisine as hokke and in Korean cuisine as imyeonsu (임연수), the fish can be fresh, dried, or frozen, and can be served raw, boiled, grilled or fried.

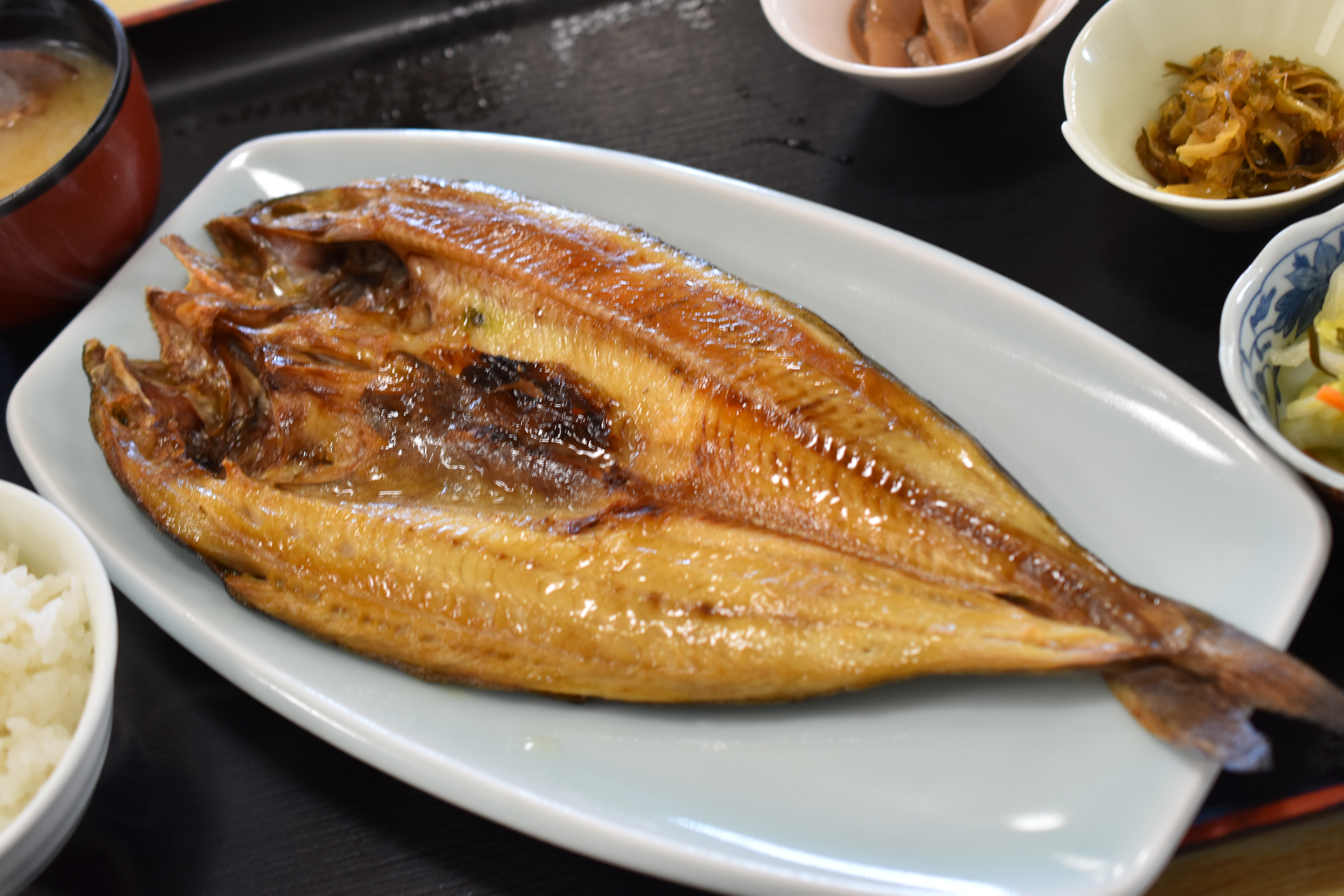
Japanese grilled Okhotsk atka mackerel (hokke)

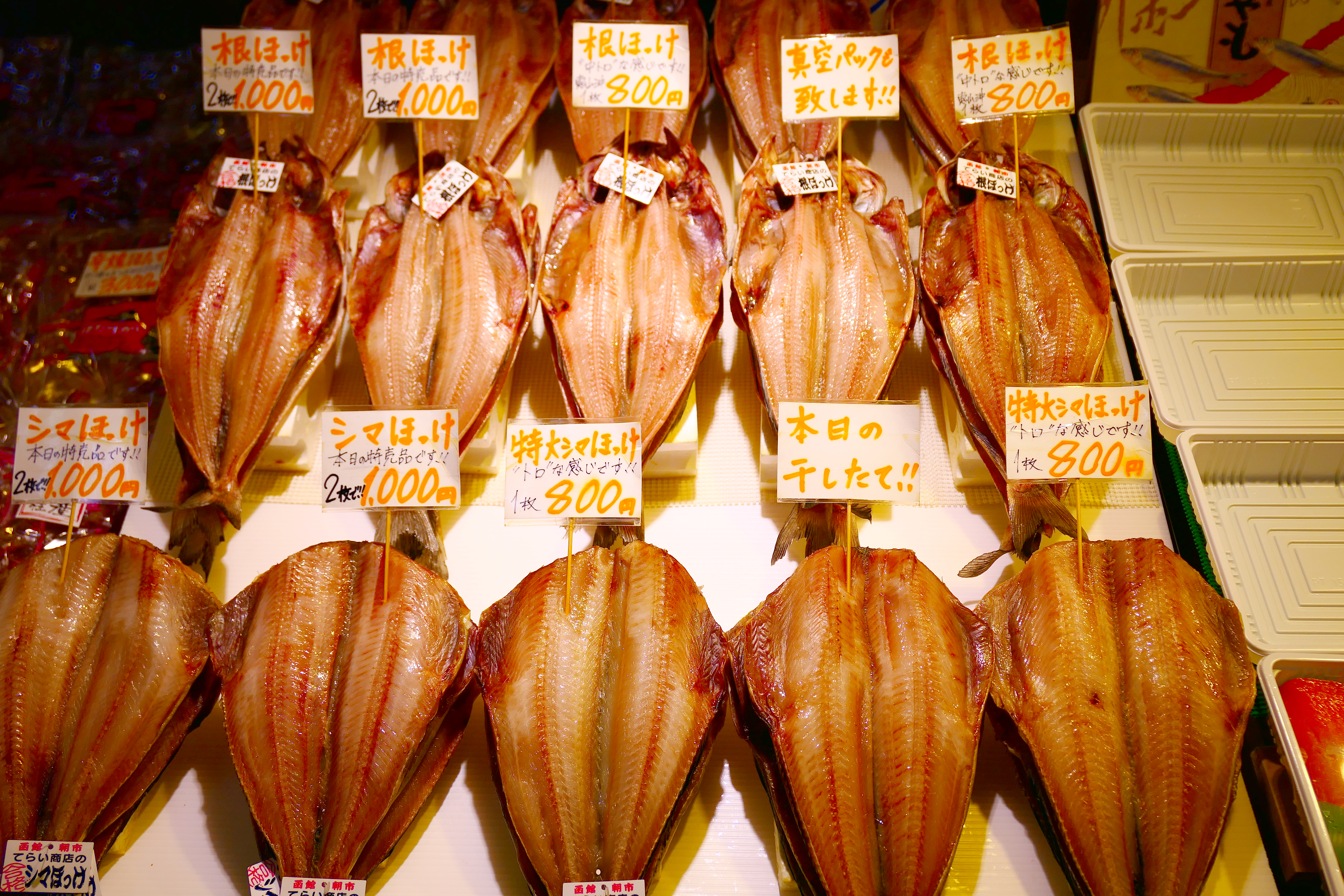

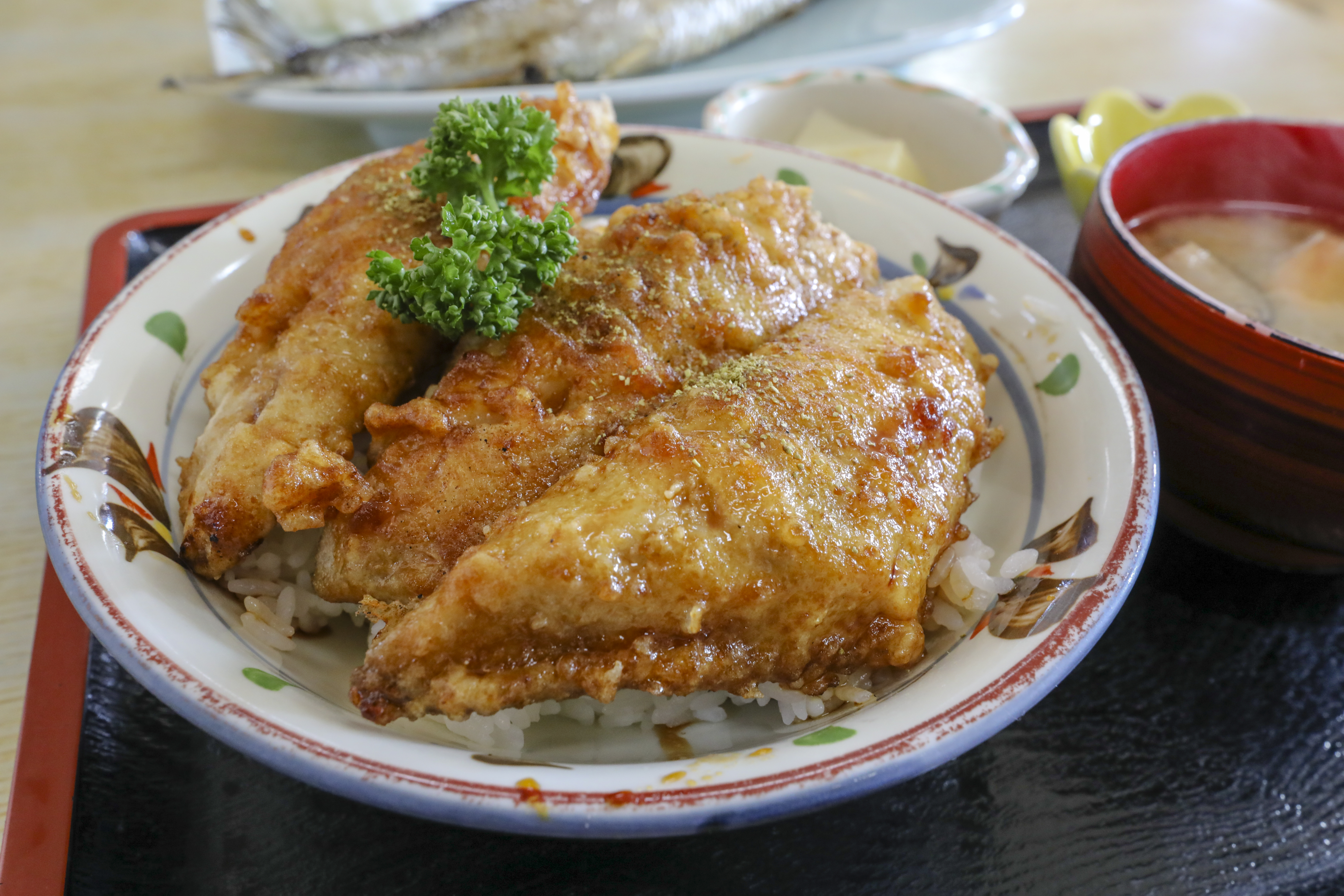

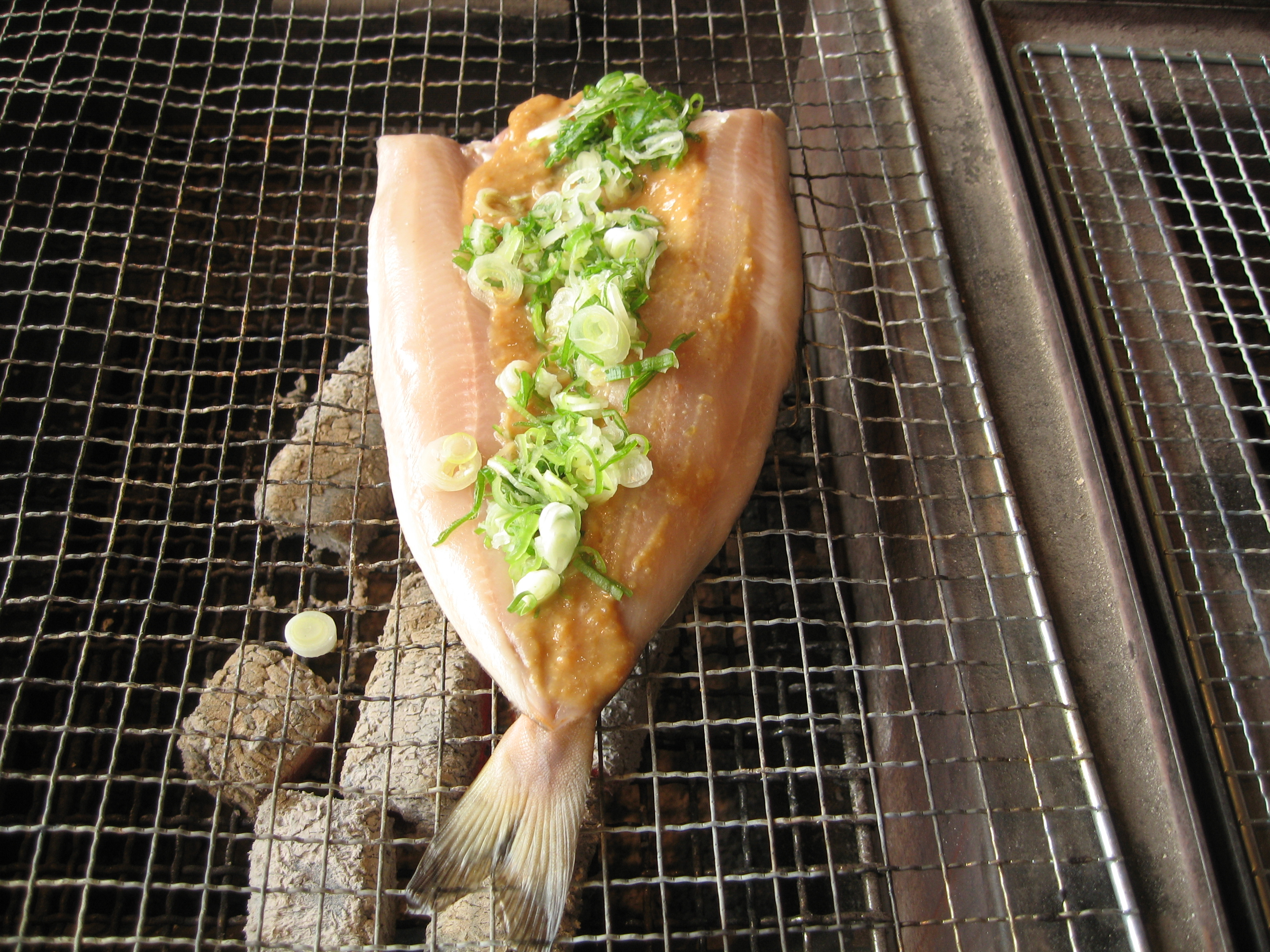
