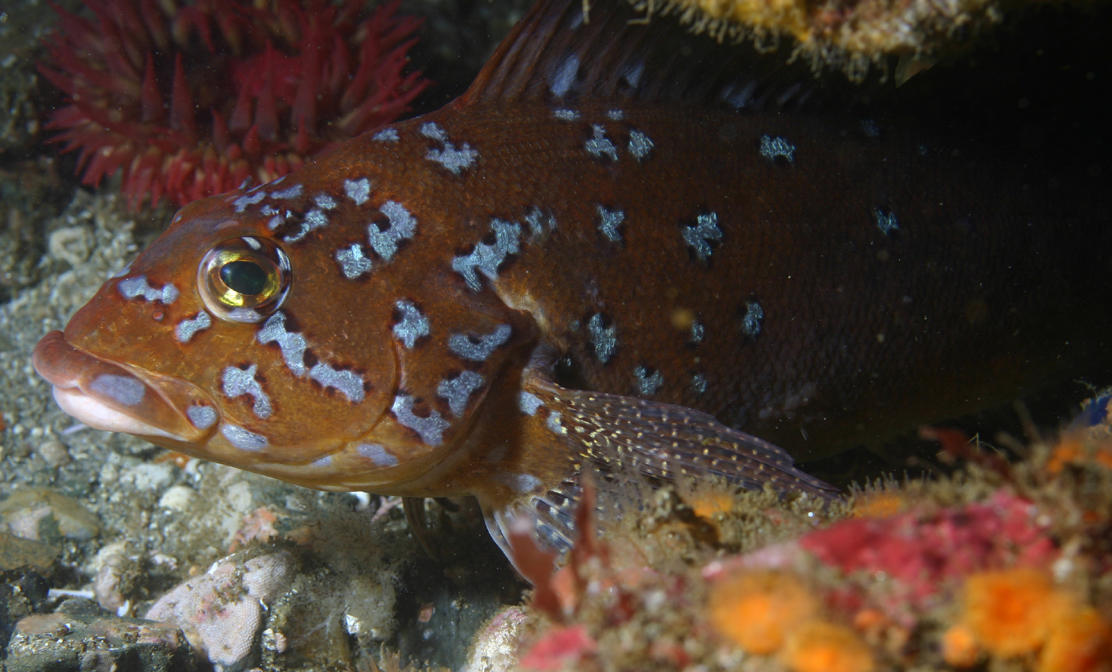

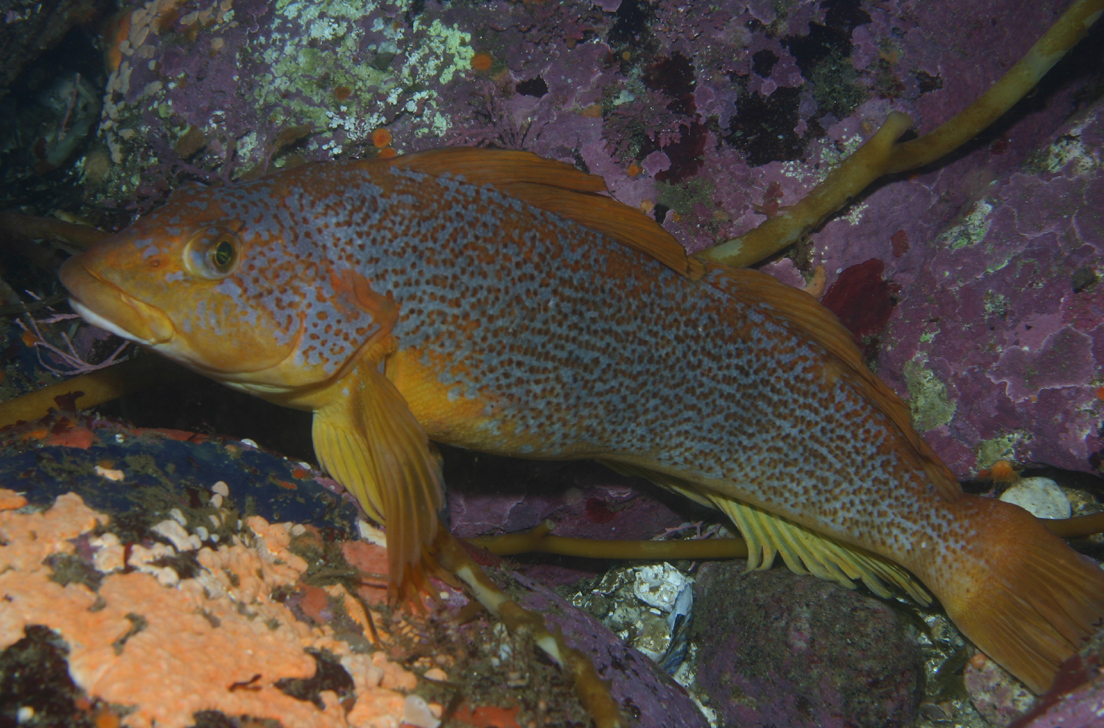
- Male (top) and female (bottom)

Conservation status
- Least Concern (IUCN 3.1)

Scientific classification
- Kingdom: Animalia
- Phylum: Chordata
- Class: Actinopterygii
- Division: Teleostei
- Order: Perciformes
- Suborder: Cottoidei
- Family: Hexagrammidae
- Genus: Hexagrammos
- Species: H. decagrammus

Binomial name
- Hexagrammos decagrammus (Pallas, 1810)

Synonyms
- List: Labrax decagrammus Pallas, 1810; Chiropsis decagrammus (Pallas, 1810); Chirus denarius Richardson, 1844; Grystes lineatus Ayres, 1854; Chirus guttatus Girard, 1854; Chirus constellatus Girard, 1854; Chirus maculoseriatus Lockington, 1880

= Kelp greenling =

Species of fish

The kelp greenling (Hexagrammos decagrammus) is a species of marine ray-finned fish belonging to the family Hexagrammidae, the greenlings. It occurs in the eastern Pacific Ocean

== Taxonomy ==
The kelp greenling was first formally described in 1810 as Labrax decagrammus by the German naturalist Peter Simon Pallas with its type locality given as Cape St. Elias in Alaska.

The specific name, decagrammus, means "ten lines" refers to the 5 lateral line canals on each flank, giving a total of 10.

== Distribution and habitat ==
The kelp greenling is found in the eastern pacific Ocean where its range extends from the Aleutian Islands of Alaska to La Jolla in southern California. This species occurs in rocky nearshore areas of the northern is common on kelp beds and on sand bottoms.

== Description ==
Male

Female

This species has a maximum published total length of 61 cm (24 in) and a maximum published weight of 2.1 kg (4.6 lb). Kelp greenlings 21 or 22 spines in their first dorsal fin and 24 soft rays in their second dorsal fin while the anal fin contains a single spine and 23 or 24 soft rays.

The males are gray to brownish olive in color, dotted with irregular blue spots over the anterior half to two-thirds of their body. Each of these spots has a ring of small rusty spots around it. The females are also gray to brownish in color but they are marked all over with rust colored or golden spots. They have yellowish orange fins. In both males and females the inside of the oral cavity is yellowish and there is frequently an eye-like spot, an ocellus. at the rear of the second dorsal fin. There are five lateral lines on each flank, as well as a fleshy cirrhi over the eye with another halfway between the eye and the origin of the dorsal fin.

== Biology ==
Male (top) and female (bottom)

Kelp greenlings feed on crustaceans, polychaete worms, brittle stars, mollusks, and small fishes. The young are food for large predators such as steelhead and salmon. Unique to this species is its mating ritual, where males attempt to inseminate eggs in the nests of other males. This phenomenon can be explained with condition dependent mating decisions.

== Fishing ==
This species is frequently caught by hook and line, fishing from shore or skiff, as well as speared by divers. They are easily caught around rocky cliffs and kelp beds, and respond to a wide variety of natural and artificial baits.
