= Sakhalinia =

Sakhalinia Temporal range: Miocene

Scientific classification
- Kingdom: Animalia
- Phylum: Chordata
- Class: Actinopterygii
- Division: Teleostei
- Order: Perciformes
- Suborder: Cottoidei
- Family: Hexagrammidae
- Genus: †Sakhalinia
- Species: †S. multispinata

Binomial name
- †Sakhalinia multispinata Nazarkin et al., 2013

Extinct genus of fish

Sakhalinia is an extinct genus of hexagrammid that lived during the Miocene epoch.

== Distribution ==
Sakhalinia multispinata is known from Sakhalin.
