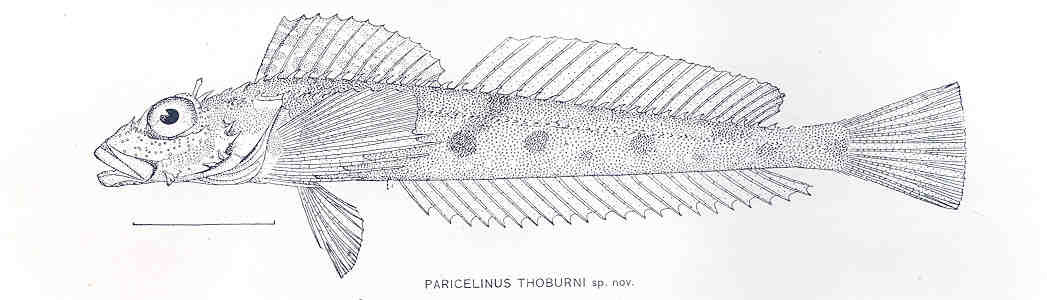

Scientific classification
- Kingdom: Animalia
- Phylum: Chordata
- Class: Actinopterygii
- Order: Perciformes
- Suborder: Cottoidei
- Family: Jordaniidae
- Genus: Paricelinus; C. H. Eigenmann & R. S. Eigenmann, 1889
- Species: P. hopliticus

Binomial name
- Paricelinus hopliticus C. H. Eigenmann & R. S. Eigenmann, 1889

Synonyms
- Genus: Alcidea Jordan & Evermann, 1898; Species: Paricelinus thoburni Gilbert, 1896

= Thornback sculpin =

Species of fish

The thornback sculpin (Paricelinus hopliticus) is a species of sculpin native to the eastern Pacific Ocean from northern British Columbia, Canada to southern California, United States. It can be found from near the shore to 183 metres (600 ft) deep. This species grows to a length of 20 centimetres (7.9 in) TL. This species is the only known member of its genus.
