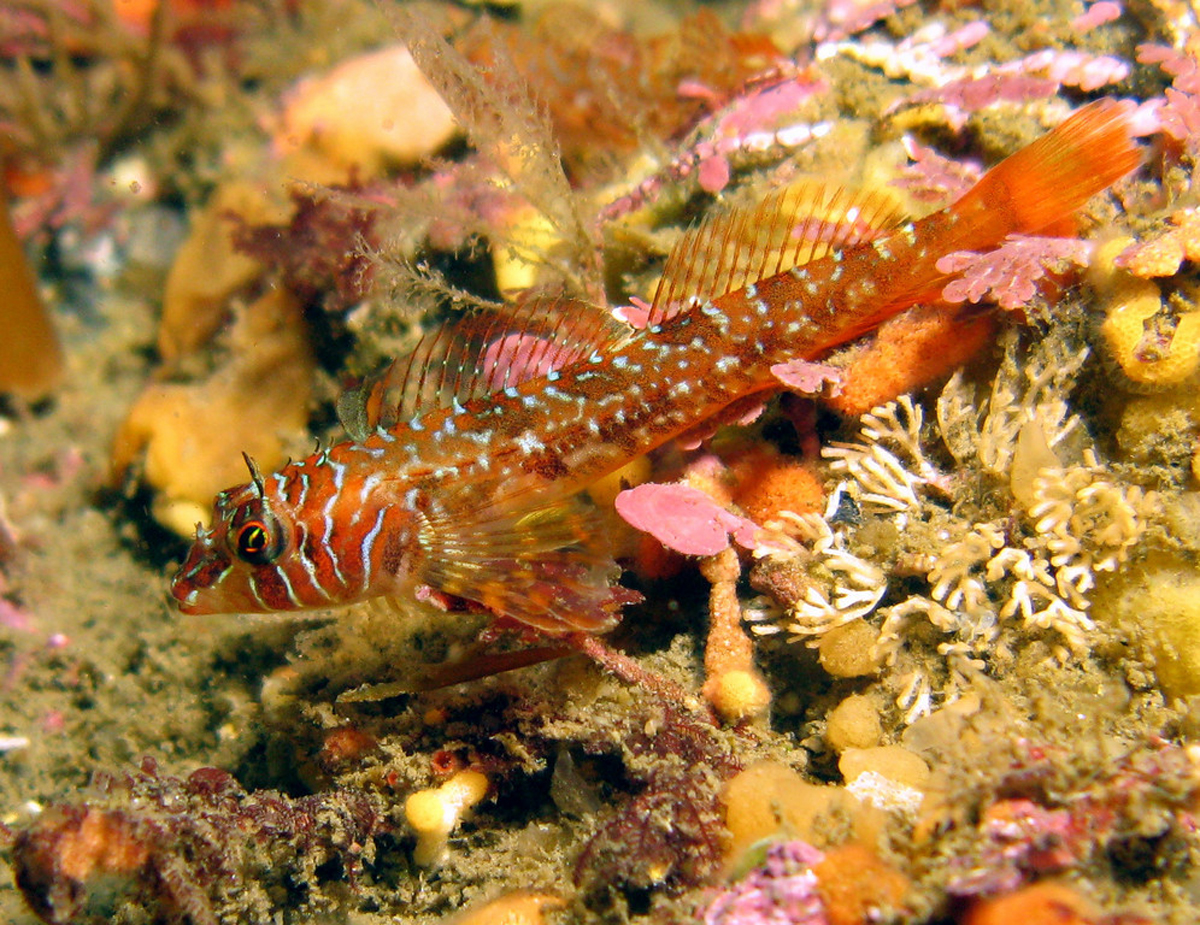

Scientific classification
- Kingdom: Animalia
- Phylum: Chordata
- Class: Actinopterygii
- Order: Perciformes
- Suborder: Cottoidei
- Family: Jordaniidae
- Genus: Jordania; Starks, 1895
- Species: J. zonope

Binomial name
- Jordania zonope Starks, 1895

= Longfin sculpin =

Genus of fishes

The longfin sculpin (Jordania zonope) is a species of marine ray-finned fish belonging to the family Jordaniidae, a small family of sculpins. This species is found in the northeastern Pacific Ocean. This species is the only known member of its genus, Jordania.

== Taxonomy ==
The longfin sculpin was first formally described in 1895 by the American ichthyologist Edwin Chapin Starks with its type locality given as Point Orchard in Puget Sound near Seattle, Washington. Starks classified this new species in the new monospecific genus Jordania. This genus is one of two monospecific genera classified within the family Jordaniidae.

== Etymology ==
The longfin sculpin's genus name, Jordania, honours David Starr Jordan who Starks said was his "teacher in ichthyology". Starks did not explain his choice of specific name but in 1898 Jordan and Barton Warren Evermann suggested that it was a compound of zona, "zone" or "band", and opi, meaning "window" or "hole", an allusion to the dark bar half as wide as eye, running from eye downward across cheek to anterior end of interopercle, edged on each side by a pale streak.

== Description ==
The longfin sculpin has a long slender body with a long anal fin and 2 dorsal fins. The dorsal fins contain 17 or 18 spines and between 15 and 17 soft rays while the anal fin contains 22 to 24 soft rays and no spines. The overall color of the body is olive-green broken with sinuous red bands on the back. The head has 3 stripes below the eye. The yellow-orange, long anal fin contrasts with the body. They change colour at night, darkening to gain better camouflage. This species attains a maximum total length of 15 cm (5.9 in).

== Distribution and habitat ==
The longfin sculpin is found in the eastern North Pacific Ocean occurring from Baranof Island in southeastern Alaska to Point Lobos in central California. It is a demersal fish found at depths of 2 to 38 m (6 ft 7 in to 124 ft 8 in)in rocky areas and among kelp.

== Biology ==
The longfin sculpin is adapted morphologically and behaviourally to inhabit a variety of rock surfaces and to feed on an array of prey types. Their colour and pattern blends well with their preferred habitats. They are mostly found on rock faces, and there its coloration helps to camouflage it from predators. The male darkens in color during courtship and guards the eggs mass. The diet of this fish is made up of benthic arthropods such as crabs, hermit crabs, isopods and shrimp These are broken up with bites rather than being swallowed entirely. they are also known to act as cleaner fish on larger fishes such as the lingcod (Ophidion elongatus).
