= Zaniolepis frenata =

Scientific classification
- Kingdom: Animalia
- Phylum: Chordata
- Class: Actinopterygii
- Order: Perciformes
- Suborder: Cottoidei
- Family: Zaniolepididae
- Genus: Zaniolepis
- Species: Z. frenata

Binomial name
- Zaniolepis frenata C. H. Eigenmann & Eigenmann, 1889

Synonyms
- Zaniolepis frenatus Eigenmann & Eigenmann, 1889; Xantocles frenatus (Eigenmann & Eigenmann, 1889)

Species of fish

Zaniolepis frenata, also known as the shortspine combfish, is a species of ray-finned fish belonging to the family Zaniolepididae.The species occurs in the eastern Pacific Ocean.

== Taxonomy ==
Zaniolepis frenata was first formally described in 1889 by the American ichthyologists Carl H. Eigenmann and Rosa Smith Eigenmann with its type locality given as Cortes Bank off San Diego, California. The specific name, frenata, means "bridled". The Eigenmanns did not explain this allusion but they were probably referring the diagonal dark band running through the eye.

== Description ==
Zaniolepis frenata has an elongated, slender and compressed body. The background color is tan or pink on the upper body broken by with darker, rather ill-defined markings, fading to white on the underside. In life they have a row of dark saddle-like markings along the back and a variety of blotches and spots on the flanks with a diagonal dark bar through the eye. They have a long anal fin which has a broad dark stripeand a white edge. The caudal fin is dark brown in color with a yellow at the base and margin. The first dorsal fin is pale marked with three series of dark spots, at the base, in the middle and near the margin. The pectoral and pelvic fins have a are dark brown in the middle and yellow or white at their edge. They have a relatively short head which has a sharply pointed snout. The small mouth is terminal and the eyes are set high on the head. The first dorsal fin has 21 spines while the second has 11 or 12 soft rays while the anal fin has 3 spines and 15 or 16 soft rays. The body is covered in rough scales and the lateral line is placed high on the body. This species reaches a maximum total length of 25 cm (9.8 in).

== Distribution and habitat ==
Zaniolepis frenata is found in the eastern Pacific Ocean where it is found off the coasts of southern Oregon to central Baja California. It lives a benthic lifestyle over mud, cobble, and pebble bottoms, usually at depths of 55 to 244 meters, although some individuals have been found in depths from 4 to 450 m (13 to 1,476 ft).

== Ecology ==
Zaniolepis frenata feeds on amphipods, copepods, krill, isopods, polychaetes, shrimps, and fish eggs. The species is preyed upon by sea birds, sea lions, and other species of fish. Females can lay as much as 800 to 1,000 eggs annually. Parasites of the species include Hamaticolax prolixus, Haliotrema zebrasoma, Haliotrema parahaliotremata and Hysterolecithoides sebrasomatis.

== Utilization ==
Zaniolepis frenata, which has been recorded as a source of food for the Native American inhabitants of San Nicolas Island off the coast of Southern California during the Middle Holocene.
