= Achrestogrammus =

Achrestogrammus Temporal range: Late Miocene (Tortonian), 11.6–7.3 Ma

Scientific classification
- Kingdom: Animalia
- Phylum: Chordata
- Class: Actinopterygii
- Order: Perciformes
- Suborder: Cottoidei
- Family: Hexagrammidae
- Genus: †Achrestogrammus; Jordan, 1921
- Species: †A. achrestus

Binomial name
- †Achrestogrammus achrestus (Jordan and Gilbert, 1919)

Extinct genus of fishes

Achrestogrammus is an extinct genus of prehistoric marine ray-finned fish that lived during the Upper Miocene subepoch of California. It contains a single species, A. achrestus, known from diatomite deposits of the Monterey Formation. Although known from only an incomplete specimen, it is thought to be an early greenling.

== Fossils ==
According to Paleobiology Database in 2025, this genus has no referenced fossils or species.

== See also ==
- Prehistoric fish
- List of prehistoric bony fish
