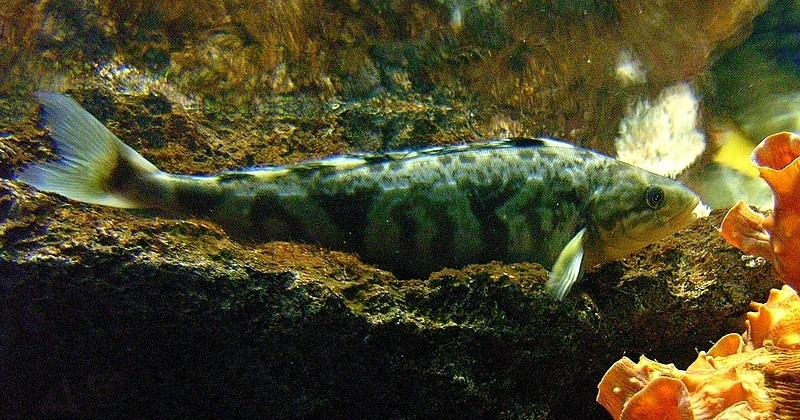
- Okhotsk atka mackerel
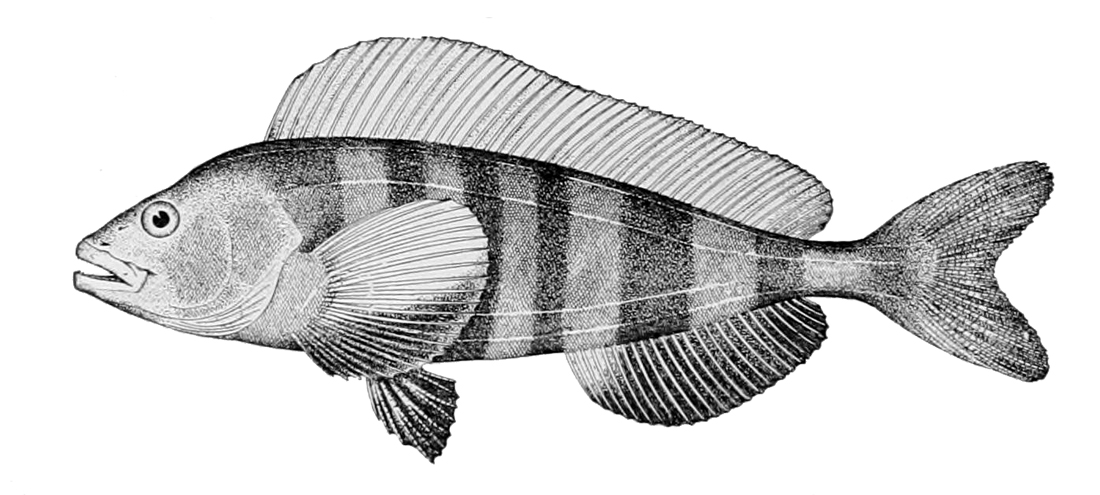
- Atka mackerel

Scientific classification
- Kingdom: Animalia
- Phylum: Chordata
- Class: Actinopterygii
- Order: Perciformes
- Suborder: Cottoidei
- Family: Hexagrammidae
- Subfamily: Pleurogramminae; Rutenberg, 1954
- Genus: Pleurogrammus; T. N. Gill, 1861

Type species
- Labrax monopterygius Pallas, 1810

Synonyms
- Stellistius Jordan & Tanaka, 1927

= Pleurogrammus =

Genus of fishes

Pleurogrammus is a genus of ray-finned fishes belonging to the family Hexagrammidae, the greenlings, known as Atka mackerels. These fishes are found in the northwestern Pacific Ocean.

== Taxonomy ==
Pleurogrammus was first proposed as a genus in 1861 by the American biologist Theodore Gill with Labrax monopterygius, which had been described in 1810 by Peter Simon Pallas, as its type species. The genus was placed in the monogeneric subfamily Pleurogramminae within the family Hexagrammidae by E. P. Rutenberg in 1954.

== Etymology ==
Pleurogrammus is a compound of pleuro, which means "side", and grammus, meaning "line", a reference to the five lateral line canals on each flank.

== Species ==
The currently recognized species in this genus are:

Image	Scientific name	Common name	Distribution
	Pleurogrammus azonus D. S. Jordan & Metz, 1913	Okhotsk atka mackerel	Sea of Okhotsk.
	Pleurogrammus monopterygius (Pallas, 1810)	atka mackerel	Sea of Japan and the waters off Hokkaido, as well as the southern Kuril Islands, and from Stalemate and Bowers Bank in the Aleutian chain to Icy bay, Alaska

== Characteristics ==
Pleurogrammus species have no incision in the dorsal fin, or, if present, the incision is not deep. The caudal fin is forked and there are 5 lateral lines on each flankl. The upper surface of the skull is strongly ridged. There are between 21 and 24 spines and 24 and 30 soft rays in the dorsal fin while the anal fin typically has no spine and has between 23 and 32 soft rays. The head is partially covered in scales. These are relatively large species with the largest being P. azonus which has a maximum published total length is 62 cm (24 in), although P. monopterygius is only slightly smaller.

== Distribution and habitat ==
Pleurogrammus are found in the northern Pacific Ocean around Japan and in the Sea of Okhotsk east to Alaska. These are mainly pelagic fishes.

== Fisheries ==
Pleurogrammus are fished for and P. monopterygius is the target of a commercial fishery in Alaska which mainly uses bottom trawls.
