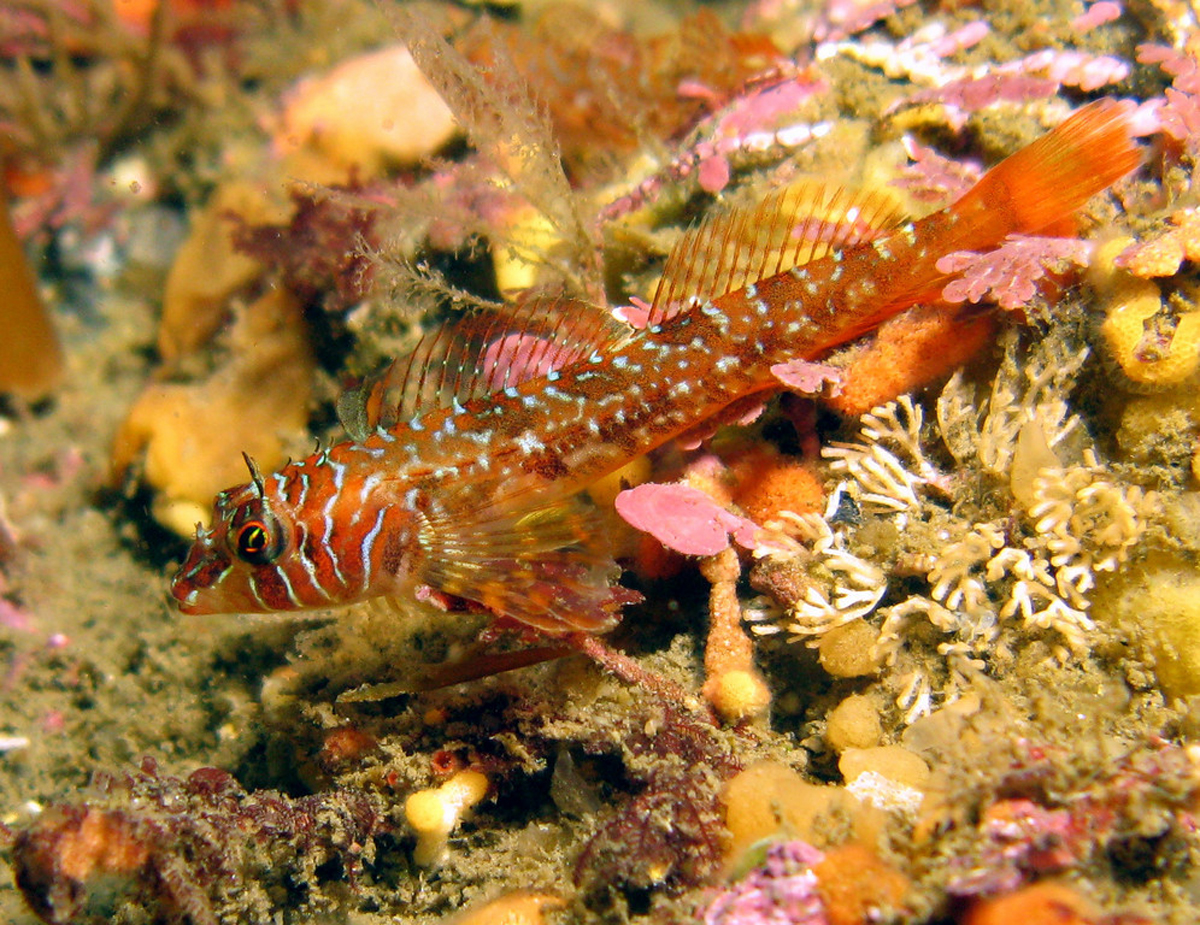
- Jordania zonope

Scientific classification
- Kingdom: Animalia
- Phylum: Chordata
- Class: Actinopterygii
- Order: Perciformes
- Suborder: Cottoidei
- Family: Jordaniidae; Jordan & Evermann, 1898

Genera
- see text

Synonyms
- Scorpaenichthyidae Jordan & Evermann, 1898

= Jordaniidae =

Family of marine ray-finned fishes

Jordaniidae is a small family of marine ray-finned fishes belonging to the order Perciformes. These fishes are found in the eastern North Pacific Ocean.

== Taxonomy ==
Jordaniidae was first proposed as a subfamily, Jordaniinae, of the family Cottidae in 1898 by the American ichthyologists David Starr Jordan and Barton Warren Evermann. The 5th edition of Fishes of the World classifies this family within the superfamily Cottoidea, in the suborder Cottoidei of the Scorpaeniformes. Other authorities classify this family within the infraorder Cottales within the order Perciformes, as they suggest that Perciformes is paraphyletic if the Scorpaneiformes are excluded from it. The cabezon (Scorpaenichthys marmoratus) is classified within the Jordaniidae by some authorities but the 5th edition of Fishes of the World classifies this species in the monotypic family Scorpaenichthyidae. More recent authorities have returned the cabezon to the Jordaniidae. This family is regarded as one of the more basal members of the Cottoidea grouping.

== Etymology ==
Jordaniidae takes its name from its type genus, Jordania, which was named by Edwin Chapin Starks in 1895 and Stark's' name honours David Starr Jordan who was his "teacher in ichthyology".

== Genera and species ==
Jordaniidae contains three monotypic genera:

- Genus Jordania Starks, 1895
  - Jordania zonope Starks, 1895 (longfin sculpin)
- Genus Paricelinus C. H. Eigenmann & R. S. Eigenmann, 1889
  - Paricelinus hopliticus C.H. Eigenmann R.S. Eigenmann, 1889 (thornback sculpin)
- Genus Scorpaenichthys Girard, 1854
  - Scorpaenichthys marmoratus (Ayres, 1854) (cabezon)

== Characteristics ==
Jordaniidae sculpins have a single pharyngobranchial on the gill arch, 5 finrays in the pelvic fin a long body with a long based anal fin, 2 separate dorsal fins and reduced gills. These fishes reach a maximum published total length of 15 to 20 cm (5.9 to 7.9 in).

== Distribution and habitat ==
Jordaniidae sculpins are found in the eastern Pacific Ocean from Alaska to California. They are demersal fish found from the intertidal zone to 138 m (453 ft) in rocky areas.
