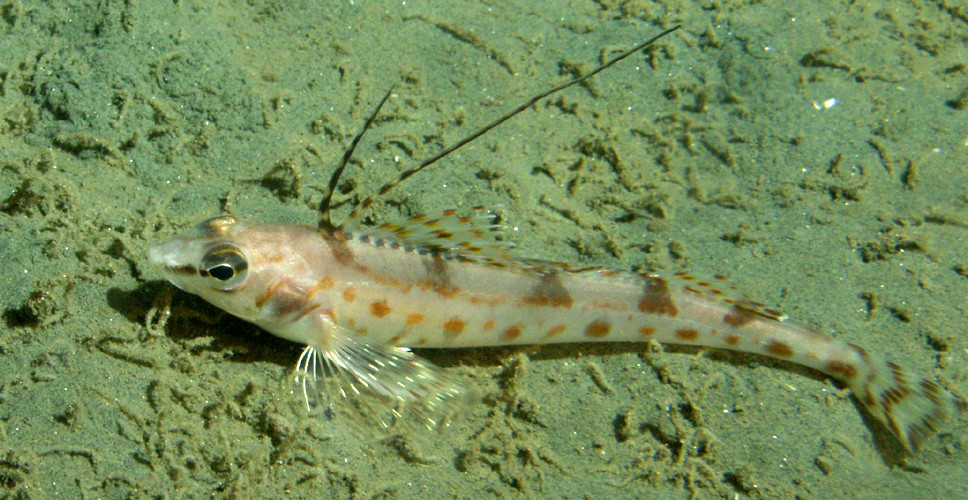
- Longspine Combfish (Z. latipinnis)

Scientific classification
- Kingdom: Animalia
- Phylum: Chordata
- Class: Actinopterygii
- Order: Perciformes
- Suborder: Cottoidei
- Superfamily: Zaniolepidoidea; Jordan & Gilbert, 1883
- Family: Zaniolepididae; Jordan & Gilbert, 1883
- Genus: Zaniolepis; Girard, 1858

Type species
- Zaniolepis latipinnis Girard, 1858

Synonyms
- Xantocles Jordan, 1917

= Zaniolepis =

Zaniolepis Temporal range: Pleistocene to Present

Genus of fishes

Zaniolepis, the combfishes, is a genus of marine ray-finned fish. It is the only member of the family Zaniolepididae, classified within the suborder Cottoidei of the order Perciformes. These fishes are native to the eastern Pacific Ocean.

== Taxonomy ==
Zaniolepis was first proposed as a monospecific genus in 1858 by the French zoologist Charles Frédéric Girard when he described Z. longispinis from Fort Steilacoom on Puget Sound in Washington.

Zaniolepididae was first proposed as a family in 1883 by the American ichthyologists David Starr Jordan and Charles Henry Gilbert. this taxon was previously classified as the subfamily Zaniolepinae within the Hexagrammidae. This family is classified within its own superfamily, the Zaniolepidoidea, within the suborder Cottoidei of the Scorpaeniformes. Other workers have found that if the Scorpaeniformes, as delimited in Fishes of the World, is not included in the Perciformes it renders the Perciformes paraphyletic. These workers retain the Cottoidei as a suborder within the Perciformes while reclassifying Zaniolepidoidea as the infraorder Zaniolepidoales. Presently, Eschmeyer's Catalog of Fishes keeps the Zaniolepididae as a family of the Cottoidei in Perciformes.

Previously, the painted greenlings in Oxylebius were also classified in the family Zaniolepididae. However, such a placement is paraphyletic with respect to Hexagrammidae, and so the Catalog of Fishes retains Oxylebius in the Hexagrammidae.

== Etymology ==
Zaniolepis is a combination of xanion, which is a Greek word for a comb used to card wool, and lepis, meaning "scale", referring to the overlapping, almost ctenoid scales of Z. latipinnis.

== Species ==
The currently recognized species in this genus are:

Image	Scientific name	Common name	Distribution
	Zaniolepis frenata C. H. Eigenmann & R. S. Eigenmann, 1889	shortspine combfish	Pacific Ocean southern Oregon, USA to central Baja California, Mexico.
	Zaniolepis latipinnis Girard, 1858	longspine combfish	northeast Pacific Ocean

== Characteristics ==
Zaniolepis combfishes have a deep incision in the rear third their dorsal fin and the first 3 spines in the dorsal fin are highly elongated, extremely so in Z. latipinnis. The anal fin contains 3 spines while the first 2 rays in the pelvic fins are long and robust and extend past the origin of the anal fin. The caudal fin truncated. These fishes reach a maximum length of 25 cm (9.8 in).

== Distribution and habitat ==
Zaniolepis combfishes are found in the eastern North Pacific Ocean from Alaska to Baja California. They are benthic fishes.

== Utilization ==
Zaniolepis frenata has been recorded as a source of food for the Native American inhabitants of San Nicolas Island off the coast of Southern California during the Middle Holocene.
