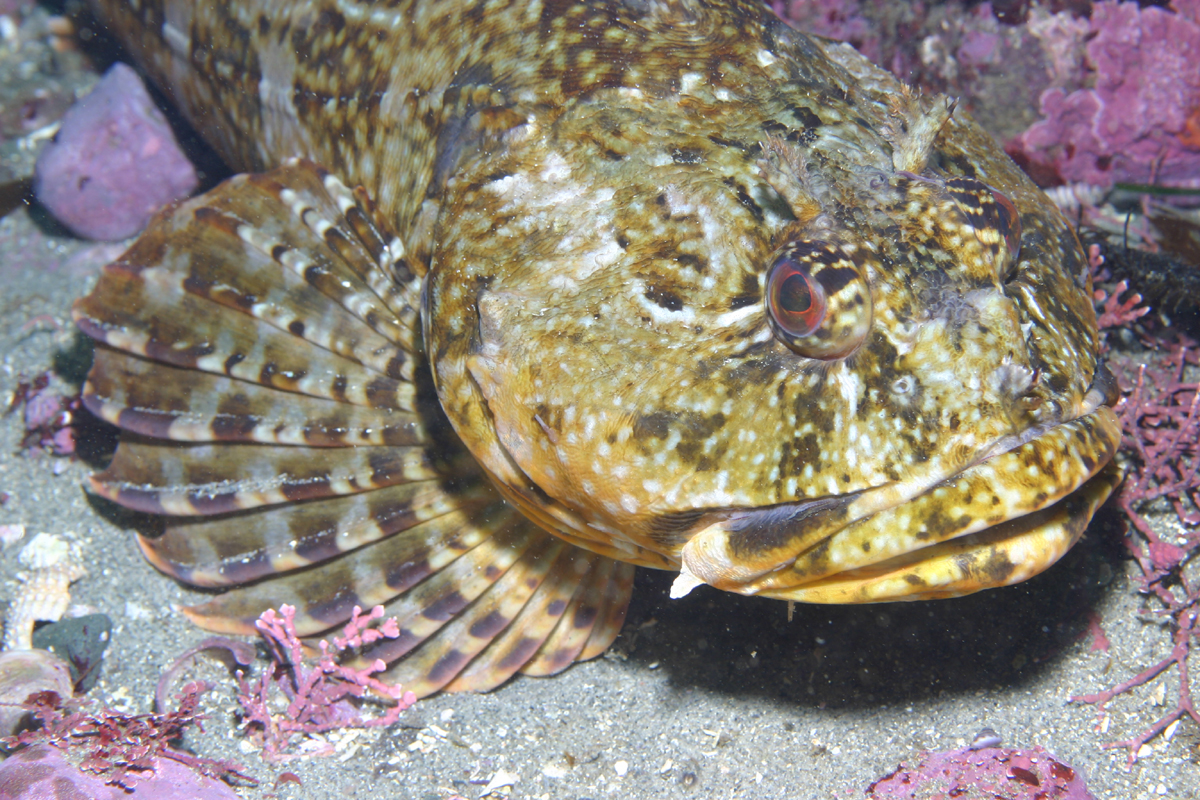

Scientific classification
- Kingdom: Animalia
- Phylum: Chordata
- Class: Actinopterygii
- Division: Teleostei
- Order: Perciformes
- Suborder: Cottoidei
- Family: Jordaniidae
- Genus: Scorpaenichthys; Girard, 1854
- Species: S. marmoratus

Binomial name
- Scorpaenichthys marmoratus (Ayres, 1854)

Synonyms
- Hemitripterus marmoratus Ayres, 1854; Scorpaenichthys marmoratus Girard, 1854

= Cabezon (fish) =

Species of fish

The cabezon (Scorpaenichthys marmoratus) is a large species of sculpin native to the Pacific coast of North America. Although the generic name translates literally as "scorpion fish", true scorpionfish (such as lionfish) belong to the related family Scorpaenidae. The cabezon is the only known member of its genus.

== Taxonomy and etymology ==
The cabezon was first formally described as Hemitripterus marmoratus in 1854 by American physician and ichthyologist William Orville Ayres, with its type locality given as California. Both Ayres and the French biologist Charles Frédéric Girard published the specific name marmoratus for this taxon in 1854, Ayres published his name on 8 September in The Pacific, a San Francisco-based journal in which the California Academy of Sciences published its meeting reports and the name was published once more on 22 September in the Proceedings of the California Academy of Sciences. Girard's name was deemed to have been published on 6 October and authorship was confirmed in favor of Ayres in the ICZN Opinion 1583 in 1990. Girard classified this species in the monospecific genus Scorpaenichthys.

The cabezon was previously classified as belonging to the monotypic family Scorpaenichthyidae in the fifth edition of Fishes of the World. but subsequent authorities, such as Eschmeyer's Catalog of Fishes, have placed the taxon within the Jordaniidae. In either case the cabezon is regarded as one of the more basal members of the superfamily Cottoidea.

== Description ==
The cabezon is a scaleless fish with a broad, bony support extending from the eye across the cheek just under the skin. It is the largest member of the cottoidea/ sculpin superfamily and lacks scaling through the body. It has 11 spines on the dorsal fin. The cabezon also has a stout spine before the eye, an anal fin of soft rays, and a fleshy flap on the middle of the snout. A pair of longer tentacle-like flaps is just behind the eyes, also known as a cirrus. The mouth is broad with many small teeth. The coloring varies, but is generally mottled, as the species name marmoratus suggests, with browns, greens and reds. >90% of red fish are males, whereas >90% of green fish are females. The belly is also observed as a pale turquoise or even white. Within Cabezon, that are kept in aquariums, there is some evidence suggesting that they have the ability to camouflage to match their surroundings. Like the lingcod, which shares the same range as the cabezon, the flesh can blue in color, as well as the internal organs, depending on the fish's diet.

It reaches up to 99 cm (3 ft 3 in) in length and 14 kg (31 lb) in weight, while the largest cabezon caught was 11.3 kg (24 lb 15 oz) As the Spanish-origin name cabezon implies, the fish has a very large head relative to its body.

== Distribution and habitat ==
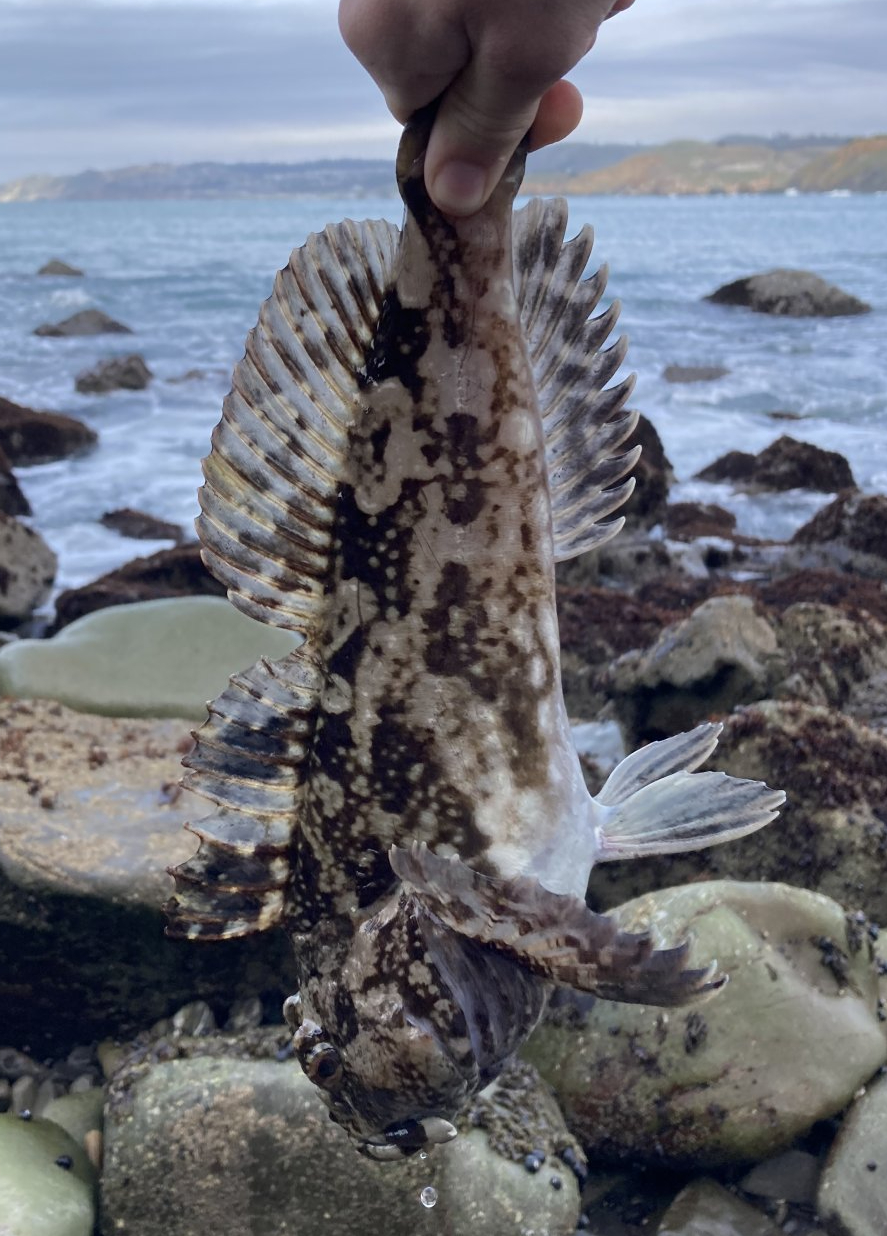
A medium-sized cabezon with grey-brown coloration caught near Pacifica, California

Cabezon are found in the northeast Pacific Ocean from Sitka, Alaska, to Punta Abreojos, Baja California. Cabezon inhabit the tops of rocky ledges as opposed to rockfish and lingcod, which usually inhabit the sheer faces of these features.

They are found in a wide range of habitats at depths of 0–200 m (0–656 ft), including rocky, muddy, and sandy bottoms, and kelp beds. In their habitats, the occupied niche varies with developmental stage. Newly hatched larvae reside in the plankton, typically in the upper water layers. While they are more frequently found in inshore waters, they can also be located up to 320 kilometres (200 mi) from the coast. Once they reach 40 mm (1.6 in) in length, the fish adopt a demersal lifestyle ranging from depths of 6–12 m (20–39 ft). Cabezons have a relatively small home range, not straying far from their nest sites. The cabezon homing ability is attributed to its olfaction. In addition, a large majority of cabezon's display-site fidelity is returning to a location where it had previously been. This was observed within a 100 m (330 ft) range on the coast of California.

== Feeding habits ==
Cabezon feed on crustaceans, mollusks, fish, and fish eggs. Some evidence indicates that juveniles and adults feed on specific species within that age range. Only the adults show a clear seasonal change in diet. In this group, the percentage of mollusks and fish is higher in winter and spring compared to summer and fall. While mollusks play a significant role in the adult diet, they were absent from the stomachs of juveniles, which mainly contained smaller shrimp and fish. The younger fish likely lack the strength to dislodge even the smallest, resilient gastropods. Adult cabezon have even been observed eating whole crabs, including the red rock crab or Dungeness crab, or else crush and eat the crab using their large mouths.

== Reproduction and lifecycle ==
Hatching season fluctuates all year round for cabezon, but is at its highest starting in February, peaking in late March/early April and sharply declining at the end of April/early May. Larvae are found in intertidal zones at depths of down to 17 m, where they are deposited on hard substrates such as wood pilings, logs, rocks, and steel. They were also observed on exposed surfaces rather than beneath structures or submerged in water. Strong evidence shows that sexually mature female cabezon spawn multiple times during a single spawning season. In addition, warmer waters have a positive influence on female gonads, while in males have little to no effect.

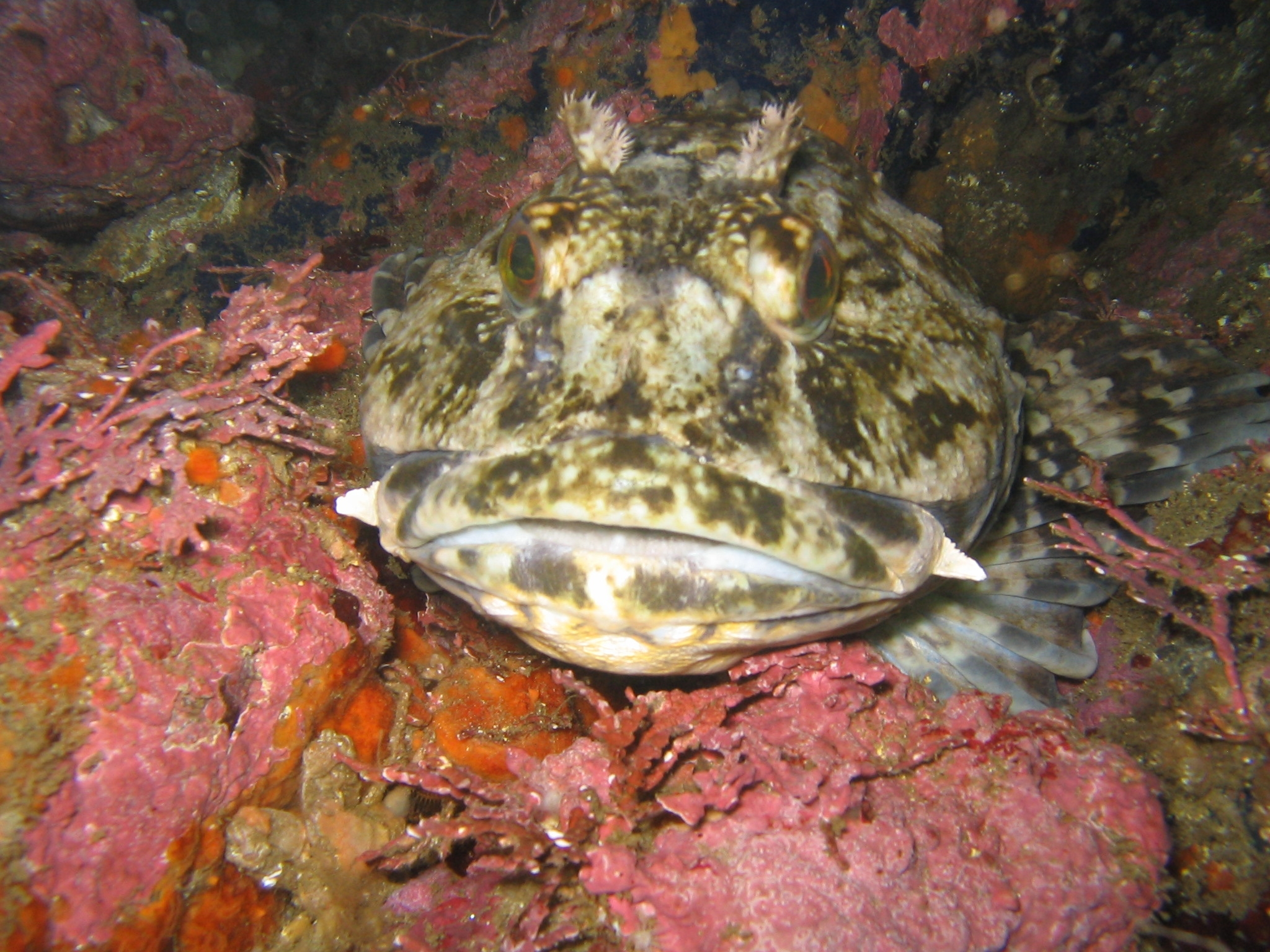
A cabezon resting on a rocky reef, with clear cirrus above the eyes, courtesy of the National Marine Fisheries Service

Cabezon start off as very small larvae about 5.8 mm (0.23 in). As the grow, they double in size until reaching adulthood, where they can weigh on average 17 lb (7.7 kg). Females have been documented as being slighter larger and longer than males. No evidence has been found that explains why this occurs. Sexual maturity for both sexes can occur in the second or third year of life. Females can live as long as 13 years, while males can live as long as 9. Females are thought to live longer due to their sexual dimorphism, but as stated, no evidence supports that claim. Age is determined by an ear bone called an otolith; counting the number of rings present on the bone determines age.

== Fisheries and conservation ==
Live cabezon for sale at a T&T supermarket, in Vancouver

Fishing for cabezon began with the arrival of the local Indian tribes, while Californians did not specifically target them until the late 1930s. Historically, most cabezon in California have been caught by recreational fishermen. Fishermen target nearshore kelp beds using hook and line gear or traps. The cabezon was first targeted by live fishermen in 1994. Between 1996 and 1997, cabezon landings increased. In response to the live fishery, the Nearshore Fisheries Management Act was enacted in 1998, establishing a minimum size limit of 35.6 cm (14.0 in) for cabezon, which took effect in January 1999. From 1995 to 2002, though, commercial landings exceeded recreational catches, largely due to the emergence of the live-fish fishery in the mid-1990s, driven by a demand for specialty foods. From 2001 to 2006, cabezon ranked among the top-four live-caught species groups. In the 2000s, following the implementation of conservative harvest limits, cabezon catches stabilized significantly.

One consequence of the size limit is the reproductive output of fish at this size, as those caught near the limit are likely to have matured for only one season at most, which is detrimental to population stability. Cabezon are at risk of growth overfishing, which happens when fish are caught before they are old enough to reproduce. Additionally, recruitment fishing occurs when the spawning stock is so heavily exploited that reproduction and recruitment decline to unsustainable levels for fisheries.

As of January 19, 2021, the commercial state trip limit for cabezon is set at 1,000 pounds for the current year. Another contributing factor in decreasing catch is cabezon roe is toxic to humans,^{[3]} because of the occurrence of a toxic phospholipid (dinogunellin). This toxin is known to affect the liver specifically when tested in mice. The only other fish with toxic roe that affects the liver is the Japanese prickleback, Stichaeus grigorjewi. If ingested, vomiting, diarrhea, chills, and fever occur within 24 hours.

As of 2025, cabezon's minimum take size has been removed, due to complaints by anglers, as the cabezon were not able to be legally filleted at sea. Some anglers have complained that this would result in fewer large cabezon.
