= Dinogunellin =

Group of chemical compounds

Chemical structure of dinogunellins A-D. These poisonous toxins from fish roe are unusual phospholipids containing adenosine and 2-aminosuccinamide. Modified from Matsunaga et al, 2009.

Dinogunellins are unusual toxic phospholipids found in the roe of some fishes, and is one of the best studied ichthyotoxin. These phospholipids could be found as a complex with non-toxic proteins like in the cabezon toxin or in the lipostichaerin.

== Occurrence ==
Dinogunellins were detected in the mature roe of four fishes: the cabezon or marbled sculpin Scorpaenichthys marmoratus, the blennies Stichaeus grigorjewi and Stichaeus nozawae, and the killifish Fundulus heteroclitus.

The presence of dinogunellins has been discarded in the roe of the carp Cyprinus carpio, the sculpin Hemitripterus villosus, the blenny Lumpenus fowleri, and the lamprey Lapetra japonica.

== Structure ==
Dinogunellins are unusual phospholipids having a nucleotide instead of the typical glycerol in their structure. They consist of an adenine nucleotide, with a 2-aminosuccinimide attached to the phosphorus moiety and a fatty acid attached to the oxygen from either the C2' or the C3' of the sugar moiety. The fatty acid chain could be either the eicosapentaenoic acid (Dinogunellin-A and Dinogunellin-B) or the stearidonic acid (Dinogunellin-C and Dinogunellin-D). In consequence, Dinogunellin-A and Dinogunellin-B have the same molecular formula (C_{34}H_{49}N_{8}O_{9}P) and molecular weight (744.8 g/mol), and so do Dinogunellin-C and Dinogunellin-D (C_{32}H_{47}N_{8}O_{9}P; 718.7 g/mol).

== Pharmacology ==
When intraperitoneally administered to mice, dinogunellins have a mean lethal dose (LD50) of 25 mg/kg. Dinogunellins are also orally toxic to mice and guinea pigs and has also deleterious effects on humans. A few hours after ingestion, humans develop abrupt onset diaphoresis, chills, abdominal pain and cramping, with nausea and vomiting followed by voluminous, non-bloody diarrhea.

Analysis made on the cabezon toxin showed that its effects start 12 hours after administration and is characterized by several signs such as diarrhea, nasal discharge, and death. In addition, cabezon toxin showed cytotoxicity on fibroblast in culture. Besides, toxin administration causes an increase in white cell number, but with a decrease in lymphocytes associated with the observation of spleen necrosis.
