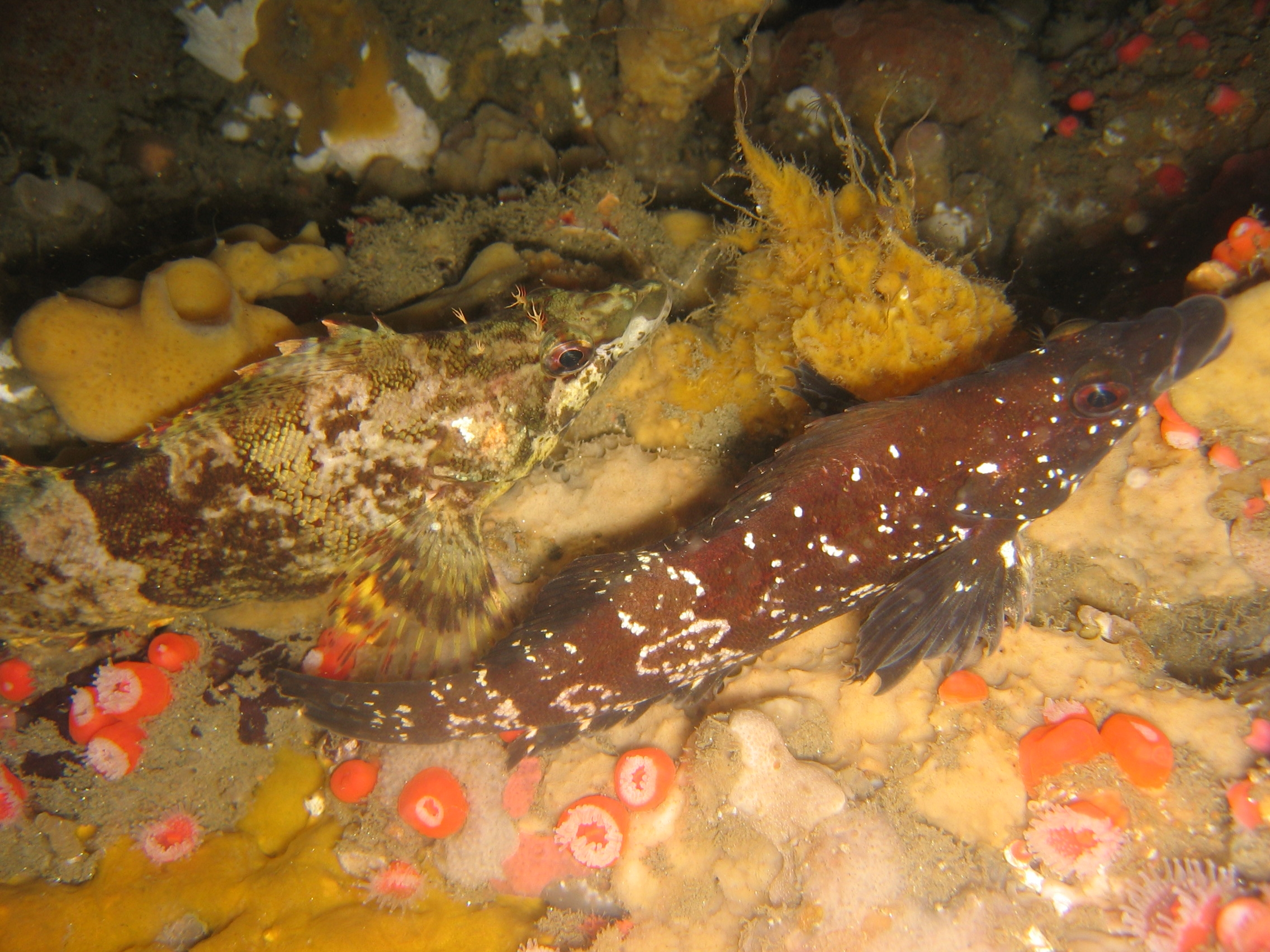
- Two painted greenlings (one dark and one pale) at Scripps Canyon, La Jolla, California

Conservation status
- Least Concern (IUCN 3.1)

Scientific classification
- Kingdom: Animalia
- Phylum: Chordata
- Class: Actinopterygii
- Order: Perciformes
- Suborder: Cottoidei
- Family: Hexagrammidae
- Subfamily: Oxylebiinae; Gill, 1862
- Genus: Oxylebius; Gill, 1862
- Species: O. pictus

Binomial name
- Oxylebius pictus Gill, 1862

= Painted greenling =

Species of fish

The painted greenling (Oxylebius pictus) is a species of marine ray-finned fish belonging to the family Hexagrammidae. It is endemic to the northeast Pacific Ocean. It is the only species in the genus Oxylebius.

== Taxonomy ==
The painted greenling was first formally described in 1862 by the American biologist Theodore Gill with the type locality given as San Francisco. Gill classified it in the monospecific genus Oxylebius and proposed the monotypic subfamily Oxylebinae which was placed in the family Hexagrammidae, although the subfamily was placed in the Zaniolepididae in the 6th edition of Fishes of the World and other authorities. However Eschmeyer's Catalog of Fishes has restored its placement in the Hexagrammidae.

=== Etymology ===
The painted greenling's generic name Oxylebius prefixes oxy meaning "sharp", alluding to the sharper snout of this species in comparison to Zaniolepis, to lebius which Gill did not explain. However Jordan and Evermann gave their view that lebius is a Synonym of Hexagrammos and is a Greek word for a fish small enough to be cooked in a kettle. The specific name, pictus, means "painted" and is an allusion to the vertical banding of the body.

== Distribution and habitat ==
The painted greenling is found in the eastern Pacific Ocean where it is found from Kodiak Island, Alaska to central Baja California. Here it inhabits rocky areas shallower than 50 m (160 ft).

== Description ==
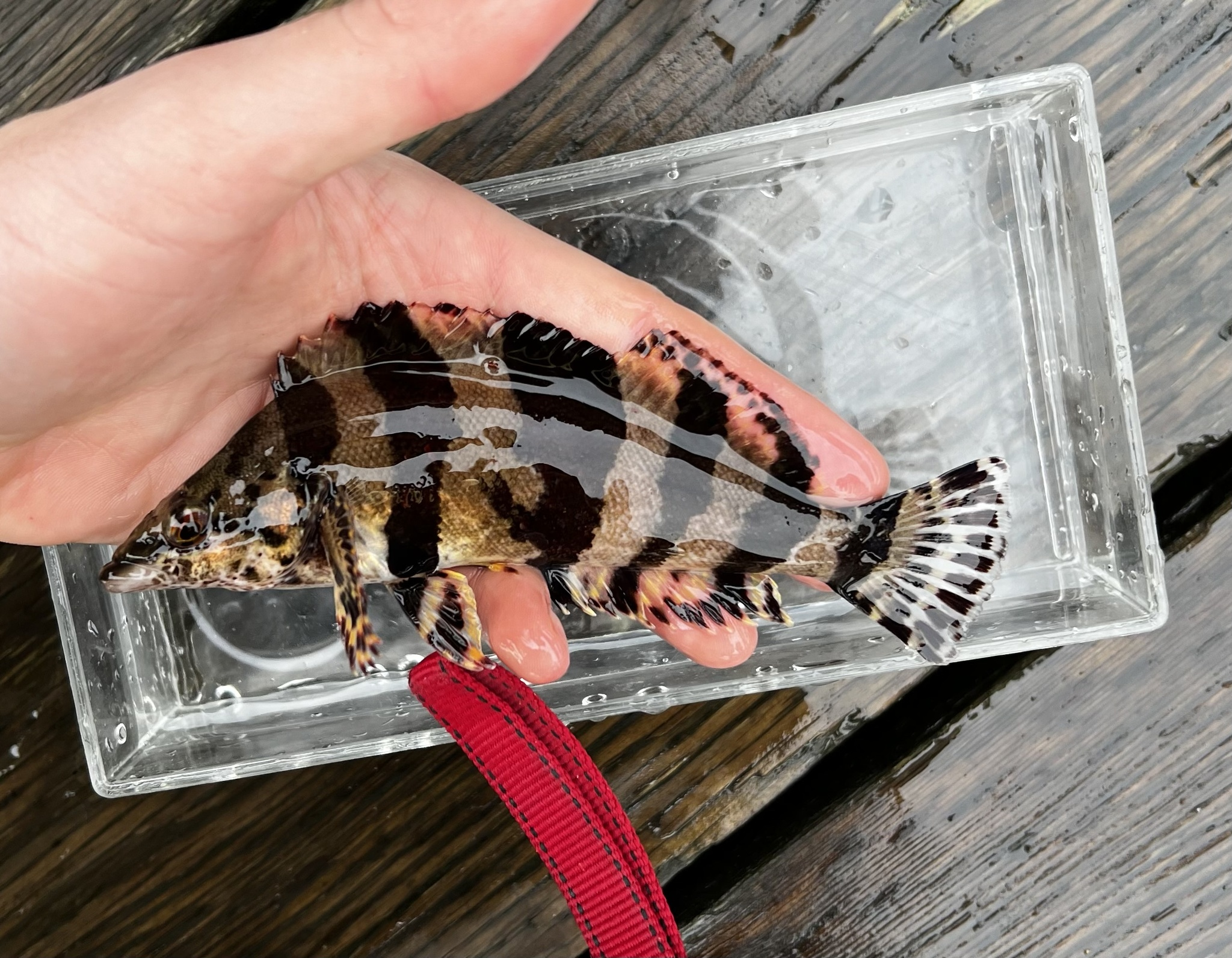
Showing size, in British Columbia

The painted greenling has an elongated, compressed body and a long head with a pointed snout. There are 16 spines and between 14 and 16 soft rays in its dorsal fin with 3 or 4 spines and 12 or 13 soft rays in the anal fin. The soft rayed part of the dorsal fin is higher than the spiny part. The caudal fin is slightly rounded, there is an incision in the anal fin between the spines and the soft rays and the pelvic fin is moderately long, not reaching the anus. The head is scaled and there is a single cirrus above each eye and a pair at the back of the head.

The overall colour is grayish brown broken by between five and seven broad, clear red or reddish brown bars on the flanks and these reach onto the fins. In breeding males these bars are lost. A few fish are all dark marked with white spots. Three dark bars radiate out from the eyes, one towards the snout and two back towards the nape. There are dark spots on the throat and on the caudal, pectoral, and pelvic fins.

== Biology ==
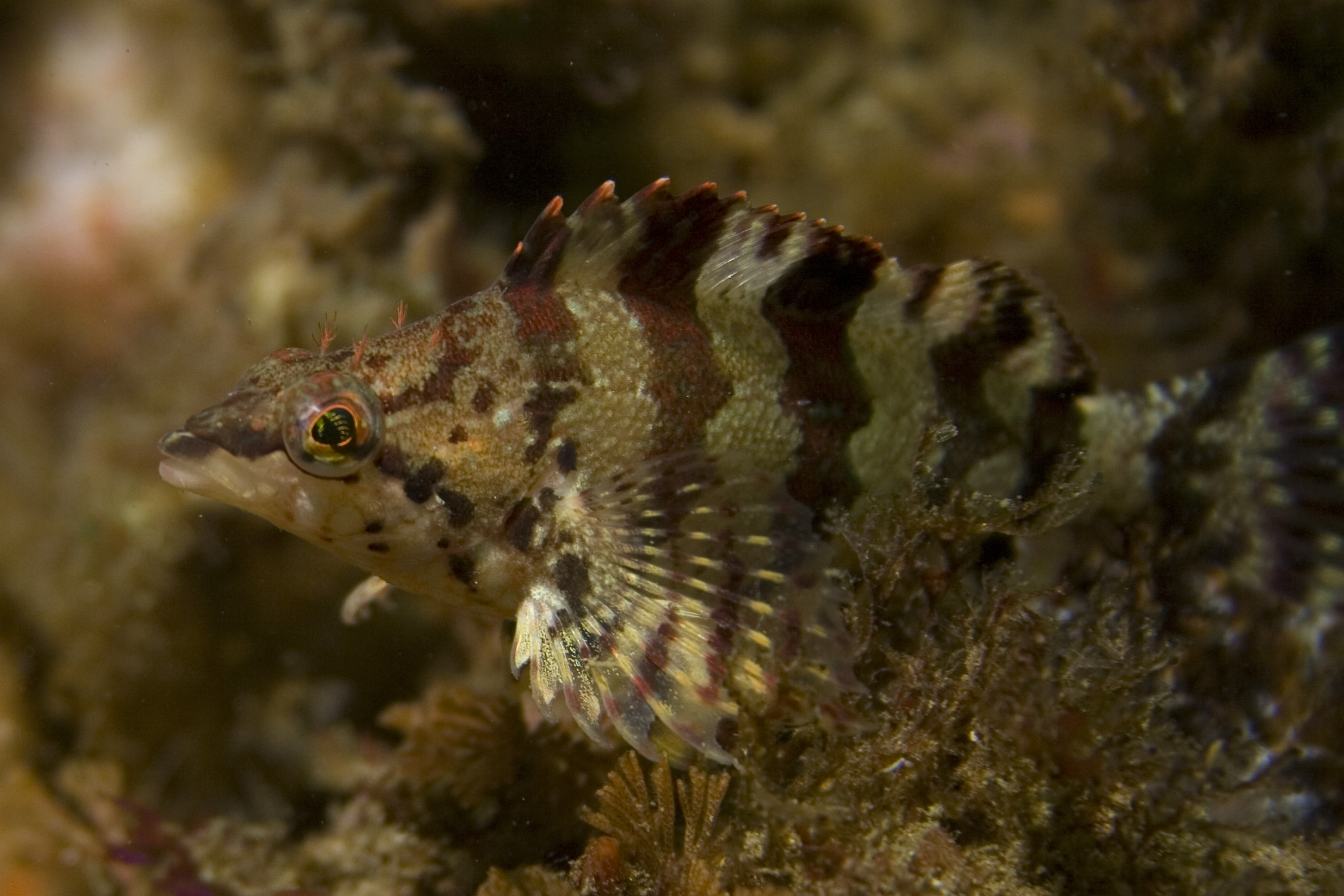
At the Northern Channel Islands, California

Painted greenlings live in pairs or as solitary individuals. They guard their eggs and will even confront divers if they approach the cluster of orange eggs. Specimens (mainly juveniles) sometimes gain protection from larger predators by living among the tentacles of Cribrinopsis albopunctata or Urticina piscivora sea anemones, which are venomous to other animals but do not harm the painted greenling.

The painted greenling feeds on crustaceans, polychaetes, small molluscs and bryozoans.
