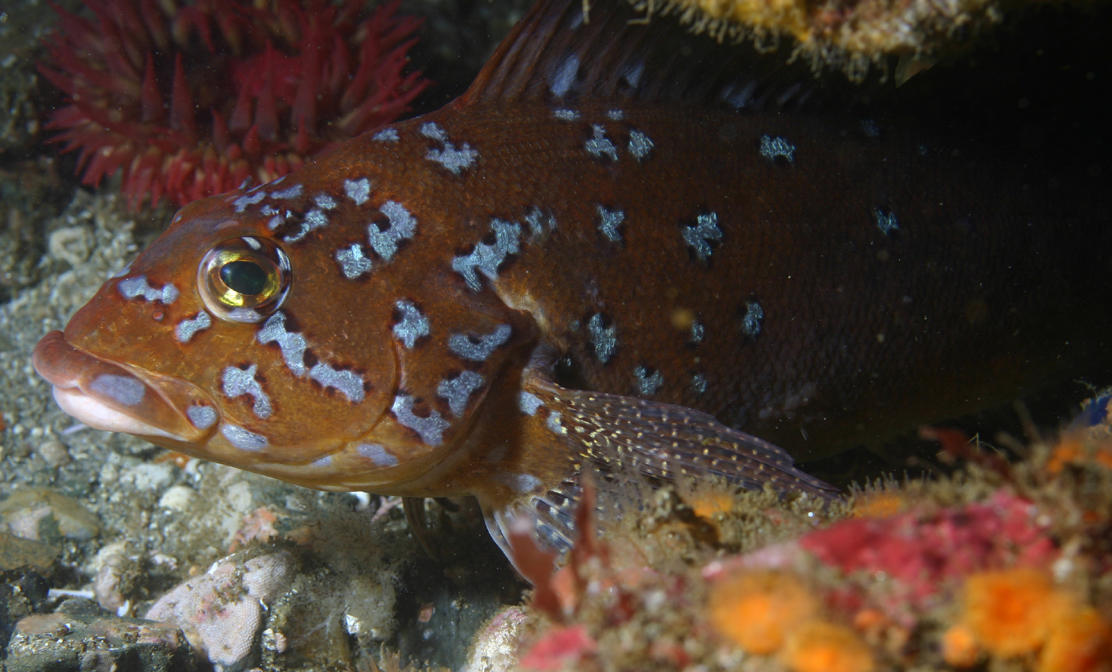
- Kelp greenling (H. decagrammus)
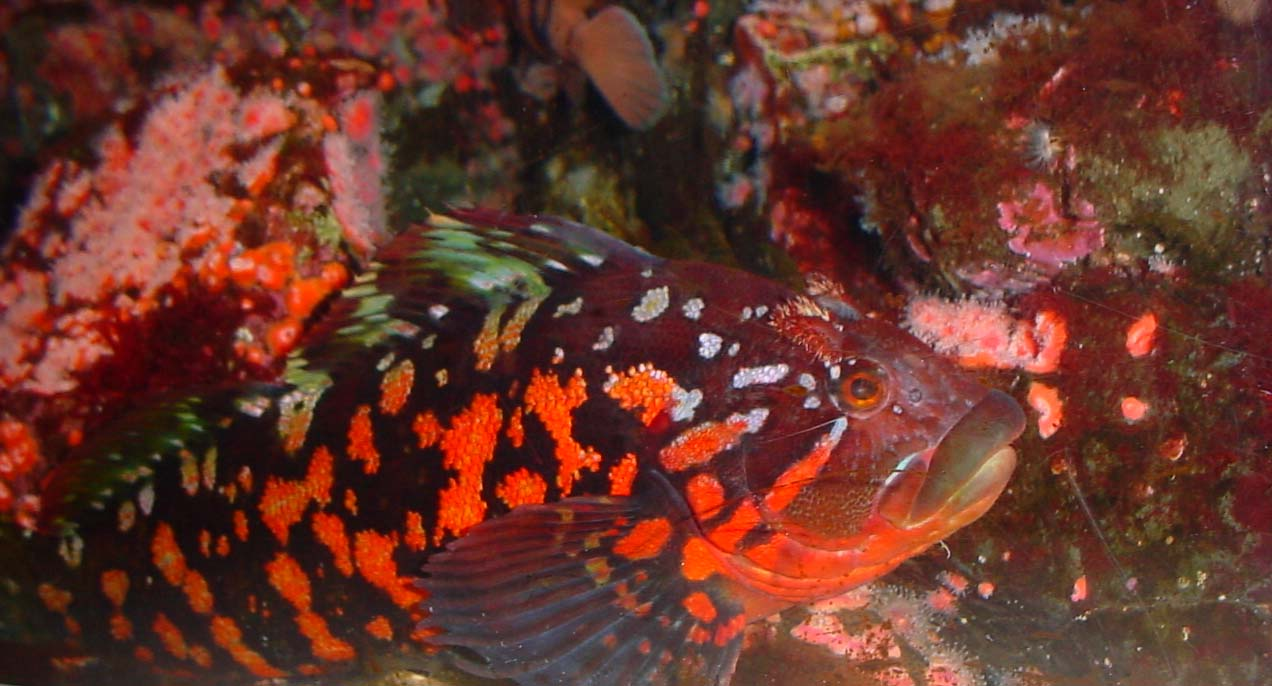
- Rock greenling (H. lagocephalus)

Scientific classification
- Kingdom: Animalia
- Phylum: Chordata
- Class: Actinopterygii
- Order: Perciformes
- Suborder: Cottoidei
- Family: Hexagrammidae
- Subfamily: Hexagramminae; Jordan, 1888
- Genus: Hexagrammos; Tilesius, 1810

Type species
- Hexagrammos stelleri Tilesius, 1810

Synonyms
- Acantholebius Gill, 1861; Agrammus Günther, 1860; Chiropsis Girard, 1858; Chirus Pallas, 1814; Decagrammus Hubbs, 1928; Grammatopleurus Gill, 1861; Hexagrammoides Gratzianov, 1907; Labrax Pallas, 1810; Lebius Pallas, 1814; Octogrammus Bleeker, 1874

= Hexagrammos =

Genus of fishes

Hexagrammos is a genus of marine ray-finned fishes belonging to the family Hexagrammidae, the greenlings. These fishes are found in the north Pacific Ocean.

== Taxonomy ==
Hexagrammos was first proposed as a monospecific genus in 1810 by the German naturalist Tilesius when he described Hexagrammos asper giving its type locality as Petropavlovsk in Kamchatka. Tilesius's original name was subsequently incorrectly changed to H. stelleri and this was the name which became settled on in the literature that followed and this use and practice means it that it is impractical to bring H. asper into common use. The genus is the only genus in the monogeneric subfamily Hexagramminae, within the family Hexagrammidae, part of the suborder Cottoidei within the order Scorpaeniformes. The painted greenling (Oxylebius pictus), while previously placed in the family, is now in its own monotypic genus.

== Etymology ==
Hexagrammos is a combination of hexa, meaning "six", and grammos, meaning " line", a reference to the multiple lateral line canals with the fifth, lowest canal being divided to produce six such canals.

== Species ==
The currently recognized species in this genus are:

Image	Scientific name	Common name	Distribution
	Hexagrammos agrammus (Temminck & Schlegel, 1843)	Spotty-bellied greenling	Japan, the Korean Peninsula and the Yellow Sea
	Hexagrammos decagrammus (Pallas, 1810)	Kelp greenling	Northern Pacific, especially around British Columbia and Alaska
	Hexagrammos lagocephalus (Pallas, 1810)	Rock greenling	Pacific Coast from Alaska's Bering Sea to the coast of southern California.
	Hexagrammos octogrammus (Pallas, 1814)	Masked greenling	Sea of Okhotsk and northern Japan
	Hexagrammos otakii D. S. Jordan & Starks, 1895	Fat greenling	Japan, the southern Korean Peninsula to the Yellow Sea
	Hexagrammos stelleri Tilesius, 1810	Whitespotted greenling	Peter the Great Bay, Russia and the Sea of Japan to Cape Lisburne in the Chukchi Sea, Unimak Island in the Aleutian chain and Oregon, USA.
