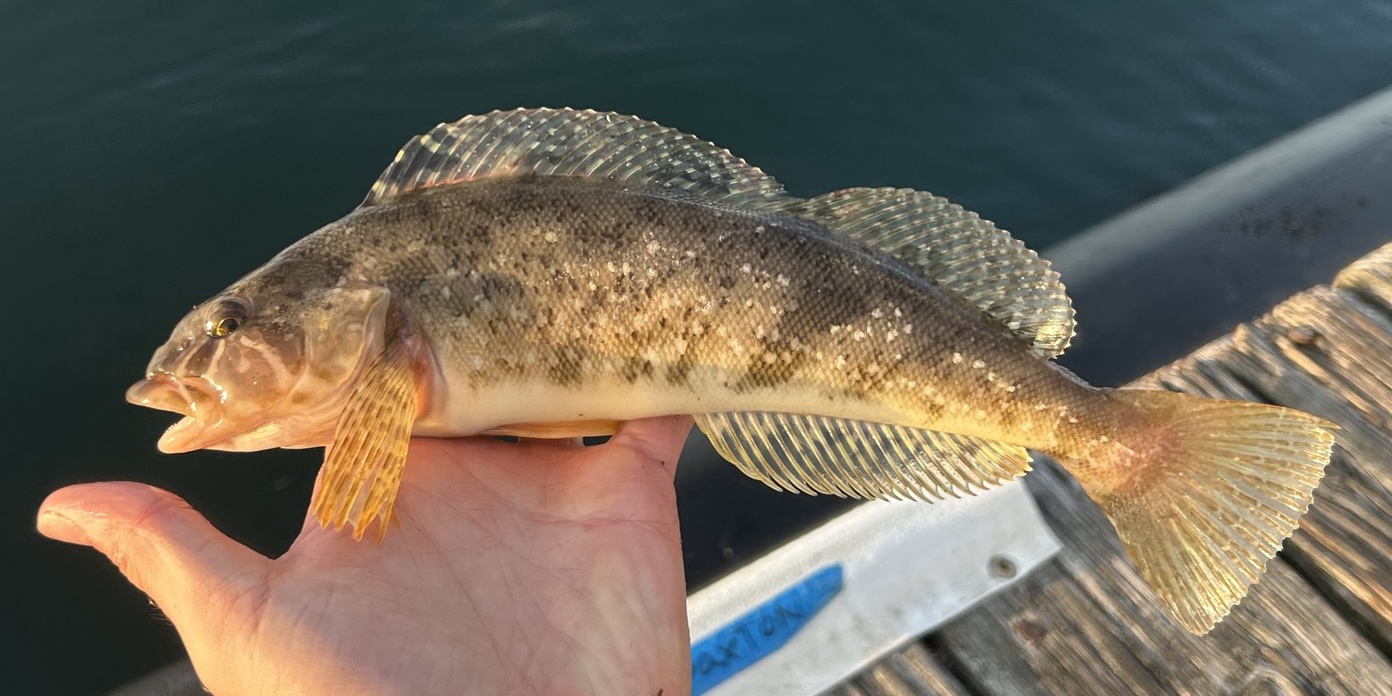
- Whitespotted greenling (Hexagrammos stelleri)
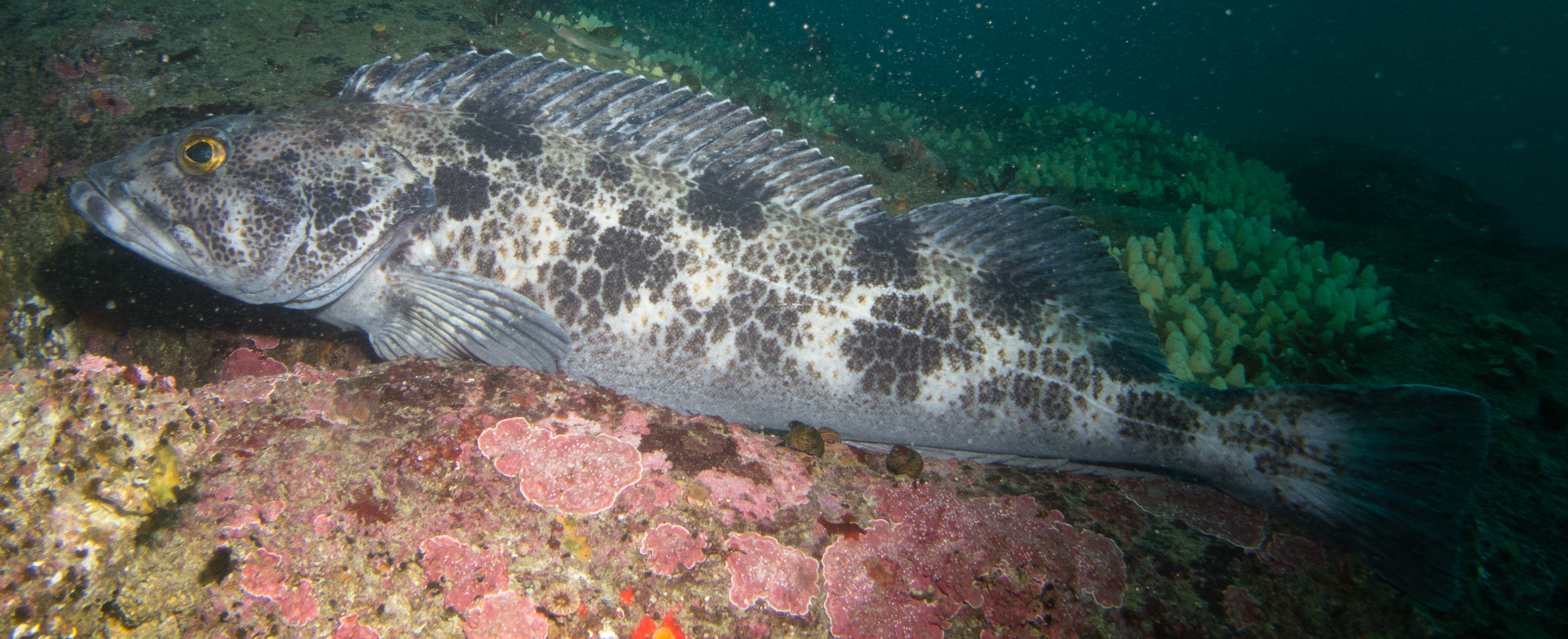
- Lingcod (Ophiodon elongatus)

Scientific classification
- Kingdom: Animalia
- Phylum: Chordata
- Class: Actinopterygii
- Order: Perciformes
- Suborder: Cottoidei
- Superfamily: Hexagrammoidea; Shinohara, 1994
- Family: Hexagrammidae; Jordan, 1888

Type species
- Hexagrammus stelleri Tilesius, 1810

Genera
- see text

= Hexagrammidae =

Hexagrammidae Temporal range: Middle Miocene to present

Family of ray-finned fishes

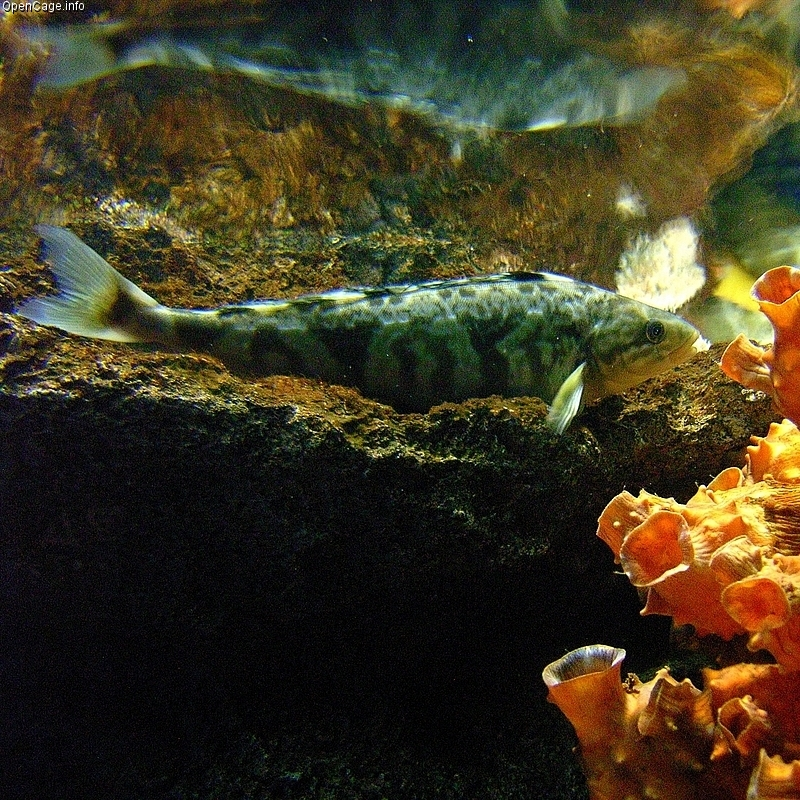
Okhotsk atka mackerel (Pleurogrammus azonus)

Hexagrammidae, the greenlings, is a family of marine ray-finned fishes belonging to the suborder Cottoidei in the order Perciformes. These fishes are found in the North Pacific Ocean.

== Taxonomy ==
Hexagrammidae was first proposed as a family in 1888 by the American ichthyologist David Starr Jordan. The 5th edition of Fishes of the World classifies this family as the only family in the monotypic superfamily Hexagrammoidea within the suborder Cottoidei of the diverse order Scorpaeniformes. Other workers have found that if the Scorpaeniformes, as delimited in Fishes of the World, is not included in the Perciformes it renders the Perciformes paraphyletic. These workers retain the Cottoidei as a suborder within the Perciformes while reclassifying Hexagrammoidea as the infraorder Hexagrammales. The family Zaniolepididae has been included within the Hexagrammidae, as the subfamilies Zaniolepidinae and Oxylebiinae, but Fishes of the World and Betancur et al classify these taxa as distinct from the Hexagrammidae. Placing these two families in their own monotypic superfamilies was originally proposed in 1994 by Gento Shinohara.

== Subfamilies and genera ==
Hexagrammidae contains the following subfamilies and genera:

- Subfamily Ophiodontinae Jordan & Gilbert, 1883 (lingcods)
  - Genus Ophiodon Girard, 1854
- Subfamily Oxylebiinae Gill, 1862 (painted greenlings)
  - Genus Oxylebius Gill, 1862
- Subfamily Hexagramminae Jordan, 1888 (greenlings)
  - Genus Hexagrammos Tilesius, 1810
- Subfamily Pleurogramminae Rutenberg, 1954 (Atka mackerels)
  - Genus Pleurogrammus Gill, 1861

The following fossil genera are also known:

- Genus †Achrestogrammus Jordan, 1921 (Late Miocene of California, US)
- Genus †Paraophiodon Nazarkin, 1997 (mid-late Miocene of Sakhalin, Russia)
- Genus †Sakhalinia Nazarkin, Carnevale & Bannikov, 2013 (mid-Miocene of Sakhalin, Russia)

== Characteristics ==
Hexagrammidae have cirri but do not have ridges or spines on their heads, They have between one and five lateral lines and may have cycloid or ctenoid scales. There is a single dorsal fin which is notched and contains between 16 and 28 spines and 11 and 30 soft rays. There is a single spine and 5 soft rays in the pelvic fin. The front nostril on each side of the snout is well developed but the rear nostril may be absent or if it is there it is merely a small pore. The anal fin may have upn to 3 spines, or there may be no spines, and 6 or 7 soft rays. There is no swimbladder. The largest species is the lingcod (Ophiodon elongatus)which has a maximum published total length of 152 cm (60 in) but typically they are 50 cm (20 in) or less in length.

== Distribution and habitat ==
Hexagrammidae is endemic to the North Pacific Ocean where they are found in the subarctic and temperate regions, with a single species, the whitespotted greenling Hexagrammos stelleri, being found in the Arctic Ocean too. They occur from the intertidal zone to as deep as 600 m (2,000 ft) but most are found in waters of depths of less than 200 m (660 ft) on the continental shelf.

== Biology ==
Hexagrammidae greenlings are demersal fishes, except for the pelagic Pleurogrammus, and they feed on crustaceans, polychaetes, small fishes and fish eggs.

== Utilization ==
Hexagrammidae greenlings are fished for, the coastal species are fished for using hook and line and spears and in the late 20th and early 21st centuries the kelp greenling (Hexagrammas decagrammus) has become a target of a commercial fishery, while historically the lingcod (O. elongatus) and the atka mackerels of the genus Pleurogrammus have been the most targeted species.
