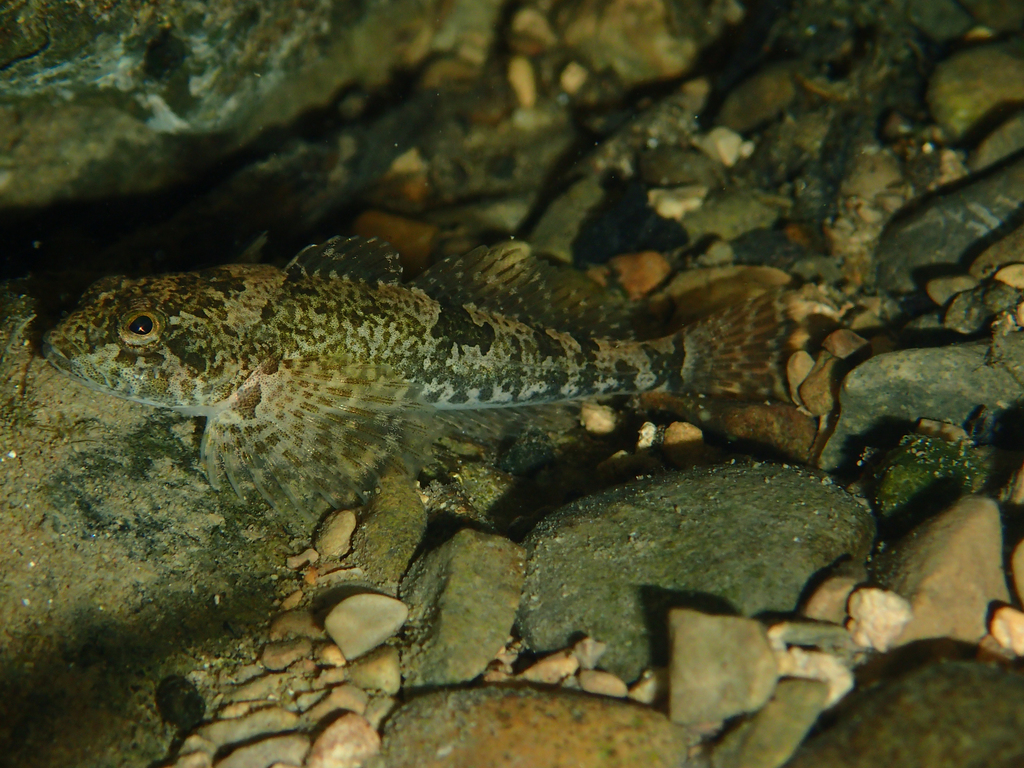
- European bullhead (Cottus gobio)

Scientific classification
- Kingdom: Animalia
- Phylum: Chordata
- Class: Actinopterygii
- Order: Perciformes
- Suborder: Cottoidei; Agassiz, 1835

Type species
- Cottus gobio Linnaeus, 1758

Families
- See text

= Cottoidei =

Cottoidei Temporal range: Early Eocene–present

Suborder of ray-finned fishes

Cottoidei is a suborder of ray-finned fishes in the order Perciformes. It contains sculpins, snailfish, blobfish, greenlings, and sablefish. They are primarily found in temperate, polar, and deep waters, especially in the Northern Hemisphere.

== Taxonomy ==
Cottoidei was first proposed as a taxonomic grouping in 1835 by the Swiss-American zoologist Louis Agassiz. The 5th edition of Fishes of the World classifies the Cottoidei as a suborder of the order Scorpaeniformes. Other workers have found that if the Scorpaeniformes, as delimited in Fishes of the World, is not included in the Perciformes it renders the Perciformes paraphyletic. These workers retain the Cottoidei as a suborder within the Perciformes but include the zoarcoids and Sticklebacks and allies as the infraorders Zoarcales and Gasterosteales while reclassifying most superfamilies of Fishes of the World as infraorders. Presently, Eschmeyer's Catalog of Fishes keeps it as a suborder of Perciformes.

Fossil otoliths of cottoids date to the Early Eocene, while skeletal remains only appear from the Early Oligocene onwards.

== Subdivisions ==
The Cottoidei is divided into the following superfamilies, families and subfamilies:

- Superfamily Anoplopomatoidea Quast, 1965
  - Family Anoplopomatidae Jordan & Gilbert, 1883 (Sablefishes)
- Superfamily Zaniolepidoidea Shinohara, 1994
  - Family Zaniolepididae Jordan & Gilbert, 1883 (Combfishes)
- Superfamily Hexagrammoidea Shinohara, 1994
  - Family Hexagrammidae Jordan, 1888 (Greenlings)
    - Subfamily Hexagramminae Jordan, 1888 (greenlings)
    - Subfamily Pleurogramminae Rutenberg, 1954 (Atka mackerels)
    - Subfamily Ophiodontinae Jordan & Gilbert, 1883 (lingcods)
    - Subfamily Oxylebiinae Gill, 1862 (painted greenlings)
- Superfamily Trichodontoidea Nazarkin & Voskoboinikova, 2000
  - Family Trichodontidae Bleeker, 1859 (Sandfishes)
- Superfamily Cottoidea Gill, 1889
  - Family Rhamphocottidae Jordan & Gilbert, 1883 (Grunt sculpins)
  - Family Jordaniidae Jordan & Evermann, 1898 (Longfin sculpins) (=Scorpaenichthyidae)
  - Family Cottidae Bonaparte, 1831 (Sculpins)
  - Family Psychrolutidae Günther, 1861 (Bighead sculpins) (=Bathylutichthyidae)
  - Family Nautichthyidae Taranetz, 1941 (sailfin sculpins)
  - Family Hemilepidotidae Jordan & Evermann, 1898 (Irish lords)
  - Family Hemitripteridae Gill, 1865 (sea ravens)
  - Family Agonidae Swainson, 1839 (Poachers and sea ravens)
    - Subfamily Hypsagoninae Gill, 1861 (dragon poachers)
    - Subfamily Agoninae Swainson, 1839 (hooknose poachers)
    - Subfamily Anoplagoninae Gill, 1861 (alligator fishes)
    - Subfamily Podothecinae Gill, 1861 (sturgeon poachers)
    - Subfamily Brachyopsinae Jordan & Evermann, 1898 (uppermouth poachers)
    - Subfamily Agonopsinae Vandenberg et al. 2026 (spearnose poachers)
    - Subfamily Bathyagoninae Lindberg, 1971 (starsnouts)
- Superfamily Cyclopteroidea Gill, 1873
  - Family Cyclopteridae Bonaparte, 1831 (lumpfishes or lumpsuckers)
    - Subfamily Cyclopterinae Bonaparte, 1831 (lumpsuckers)
    - Subfamily Liparopsinae Garman, 1892 (smooth lumpsuckers)
    - Subfamily Eumicrotreminae Oku, Imamura & Yabe, 2017 (spiny lumpsuckers)
  - Family Liparidae Gill, 1861 (Snailfishes)
