= Ozymandias (disambiguation) =

"Ozymandias" is a poem published in 1818 by Percy Bysshe Shelley.

Ozymandias may also refer to:

== People ==
- Ramesses II, pharaoh of Egypt, known as Ozymandias in Greek sources, on whom a number of poems are based

== Arts and entertainment ==
=== Fictional characters and elements ===
- Ozymandias (Marvel Comics), a Marvel Comics character
- Ozymandias (Watchmen), a character from the Watchmen comic book series, film, and television series
- Ozymandias, a character from John Christopher's The Tripods trilogy
- Ozymandias Justin Llewellyn, a character in the comic strip Ozy and Millie
- Ozymandias, a dæmon in the His Dark Materials trilogy by Philip Pullman
- Ozymandias "Oz" Mayfair-Richards, a character from American Horror Story: Cult
- Ozymandias, a character in James Patterson's 2003 novel The Lake House
- Ozymandias, an owl in the 1970s children's fantasy series Ace of Wands
- Ozymandias, the main starship in Dino Crisis 3

=== Music ===
- Qntal IV: Ozymandias, a 2005 album by Qntal
- "Ozymandias", a song by Brymo from the 2020 album Yellow
- "Ozymandias", a song by Jefferson Starship from the 1976 album Spitfire
- "Ozymandias", a song by The Black League from the 2000 album Ichor
- "Ozymandias", a song by The Guggenheim Grotto from the 2005 album ...Waltzing Alone
- "Ozymandias", a song by The Sisters of Mercy, the b-side to their 1988 single "Dominion"
- "My Name Is Ozymandias", a song by Gatsby's American Dream from their eponymous 2006 album
- “Ozymandias”, a song by Jean-Jacques Burnel
- "Ozymandias", a song by Green Lung from their 2026 album "Necropolitan"

=== Other uses in arts and entertainment ===
- "Ozymandias" (Smith), an 1818 sonnet written by Horace Smith
- "Ozymandias" (short story), by Robert Silverberg, 1958
- "Ozymandias" (Breaking Bad), a 2013 episode of Breaking Bad
- "Ozymandias", an episode of the 1987 TV series Beauty and the Beast
- Saint Ozymandias, "patron saint of all the leprechauns of Glocca Morra", in Finian's Rainbow.

== See also ==
- Ozymandias (fish), an extinct fish genus
- Ophiodon ozymandias, an extinct fish species
