= Ozymandias gilberti =

Scientific classification
- Kingdom: Animalia
- Phylum: Chordata
- Class: Actinopterygii
- Order: Scombriformes
- Family: Scombridae
- Genus: †Ozymandias; Jordan, 1919
- Species: †O. gilberti

Binomial name
- †Ozymandias gilberti Jordan, 1907

Extinct species of fish

Ozymandias gilberti is a species of extinct ray-finned fish from the Miocene which was described by David Starr Jordan in 1907 from a single specimen, comprising the skull and some vertebrae, discovered from San Pedro, California. It is thought to be a species of large mackerel or tuna in the family Scombridae. Jordan initially assigned another fossil to this species but changed his mind and assigned the second fossil to the living Cottoid genus Ophiodon, the lingcod, as Ophiodon ozymandias. The specific name honours the discoverer of the fossil Dr James Z. Gilbert.

The genus name Ozymandias is a reference to the famous poem "Ozymandias" by Percy Shelley, comparing the fragmented type specimen of O. gilberti to the similarly fragmented but giant statue of the eponymous pharaoh from the poem.
