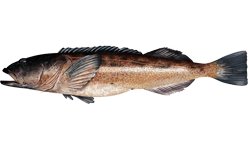

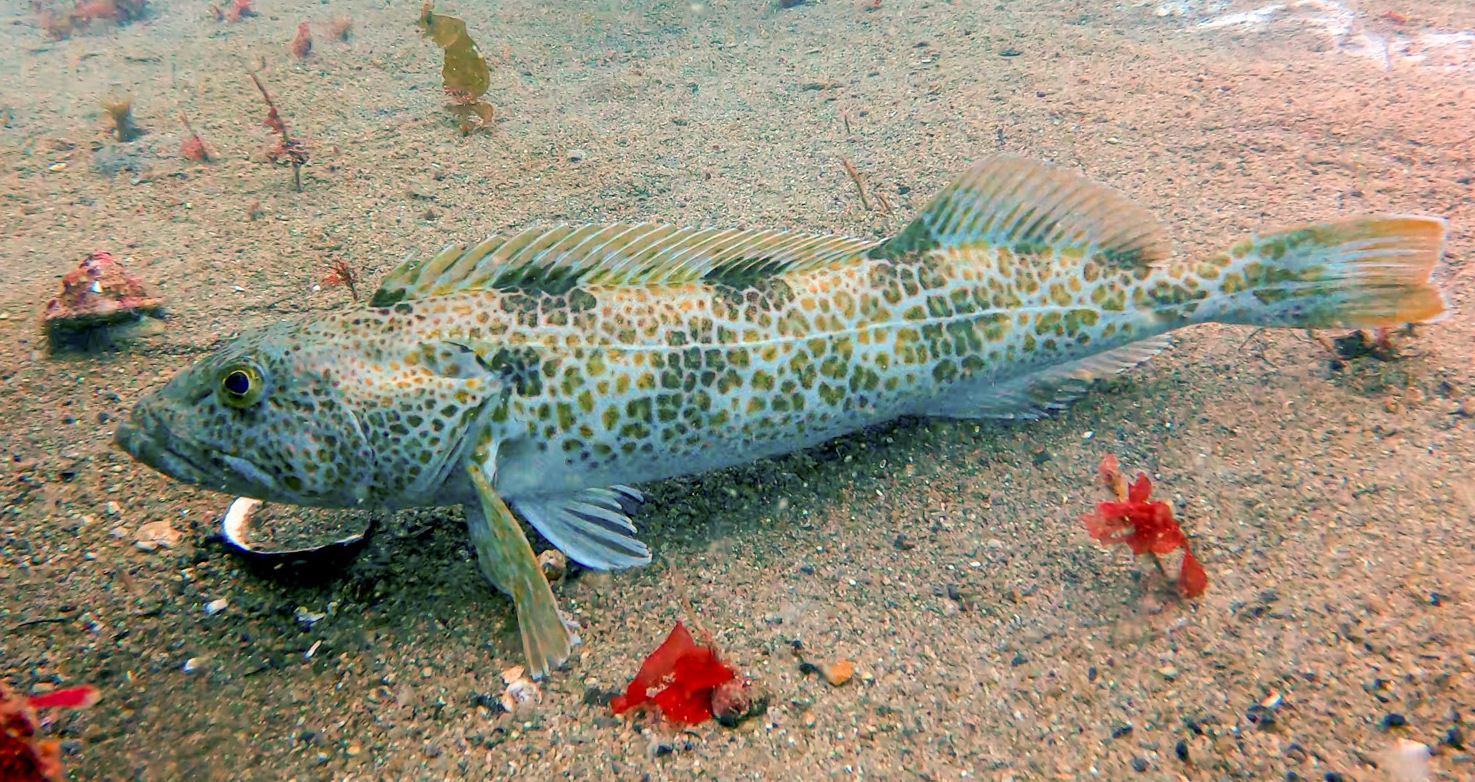
- In California

Scientific classification
- Kingdom: Animalia
- Phylum: Chordata
- Class: Actinopterygii
- Division: Teleostei
- Order: Perciformes
- Suborder: Cottoidei
- Family: Hexagrammidae
- Genus: Ophiodon
- Species: O. elongatus

Binomial name
- Ophiodon elongatus Girard, 1854
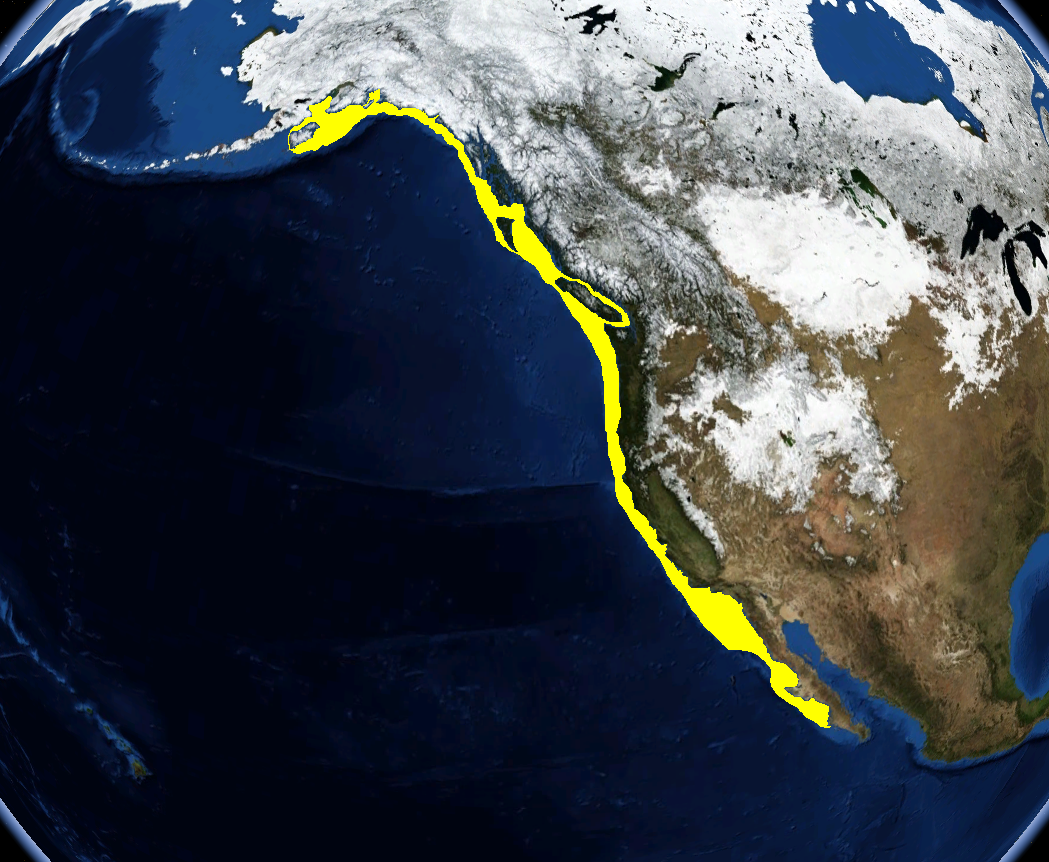
- Range of the lingcod.

= Lingcod =

Species of fish

The lingcod or ling cod (Ophiodon elongatus) is a fish of the greenling family Hexagrammidae. Despite its name, the lingcod is neither a cod nor a ling. It is also known as the buffalo cod, cultus cod, or Buckethead. It is the only extant member of the genus Ophiodon. A slightly larger, extinct species, Ophiodon ozymandias, is known from fossils from the Late Miocene of Southern California.

Ophiodon elongatus is native to the North American west coast from Shumagin Islands in the Gulf of Alaska to Baja California, Mexico. It has been observed up to a size of 152 centimetres (60 in) and a confirmed weight of 39 kilograms (86 lb), with unconfirmed reports of fish weighing more than 50 kilograms (110 lb). It is spotted in various shades of gray. The lingcod is a popular eating fish and is thus prized by anglers. Though not closely related to either ling or cod, the name "lingcod" originated because it somewhat resembles those fish. Around 20% of lingcods have blue-green to turquoise flesh.^{p. 298} The color, which is no longer present after cooking, may be due to biliverdin, but this has not been established beyond doubt.

== Distribution and habitat ==
Ophiodon elongatus is native to the North American west coast from the Shumagin Islands in the Gulf of Alaska to Baja California, Mexico. They are found on the bottom, with most individuals occupying rocky areas at depths of 10–100 metres (33–328 ft), however, lingcod has been found at depths of 475 m (1,558 ft). Tagging studies have shown lingcod is a largely nonmigratory species, with colonization and recruitment occurring in localized areas only. However, lingcod are the most abundant near British Columbia, Canada, and Washington, USA. The lingcod within this range are composed of two stocks, whose status is maintained by NOAA Fisheries: The Northern Pacific stock and the Southern Pacific stock.

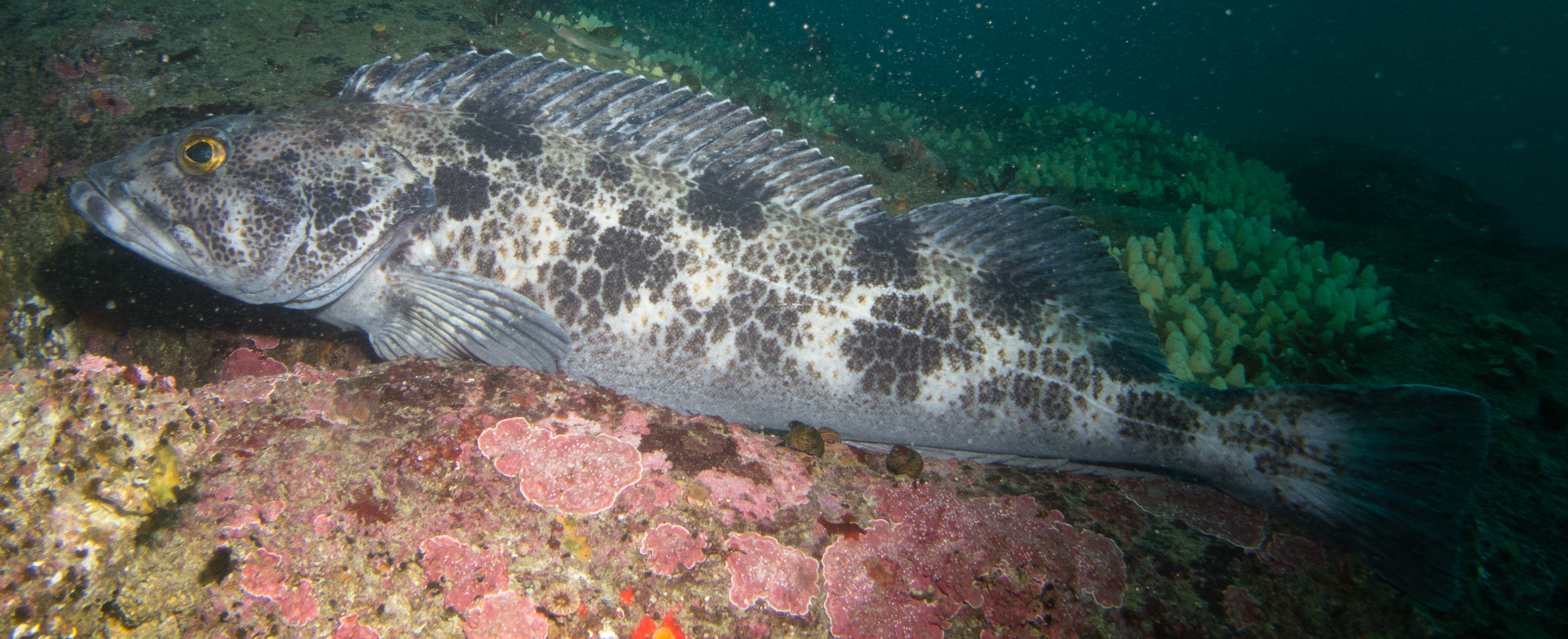
In California

When lingcod are in their larvae life stage, they typically live near the surface of the ocean. At the juvenile life stage, lingcod live on sandy ocean bottoms with eelgrass or kelp beds near the shore. More specifically, year 1 lingcod (those equal to or under 25 cm (9.8 in)) are found in homogeneous soft sediment to avoid predation from adult lingcod as well as wave relief areas. Meanwhile, year 2 lingcod (those 25–45 cm (9.8–17.7 in) in length) are found usually near alternating sizes of rock substrates with varying combinations of moderate and low relief but still in generally shallow waters. As lingcod approach adulthood, they move to more rocky habitats or into seaweed, kelp, and eelgrass beds. The benefit of this habitat is food abundance. Year 3+ lingcod (which are equal to or greater than 50 cm (20 in)) are positively associated with a hard substrate such as rocky reefs and generally deeper waters as well. Such a shift in habitat based on the life stages portrays lingcod's ontogenetic shift.

Typically, female lingcod will migrate seasonally to spawn but male lingcod prefer to stay near the familiar habitat in which they were born. However, in certain cases, there have been cases of immature lingcod migrating more than 97 km (60 mi). Females mainly go to more shallow waters to lay eggs. Lingcod have a narrow home range and show territorial behaviors. This behavior aids lingcod in returning to the same reef for spawning.

== Description ==
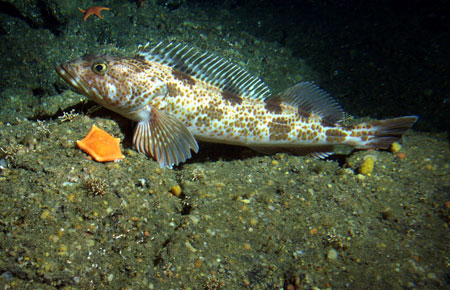
Lingcod on a rocky seafloor.

Lingcod have several variations in their appearance, including dark gray, blue, brown, or green coloring on the back, sometimes accompanying mottling or spotting on the upper back that is copper colored. The belly is normally lighter than the body. Lingcod typically has a large head and mouth where the upper jaw extends posteriorly past the eyes. They have 18 large and sharp teeth that are canine-like. This body of a lingcod resembles a fusiform body plan, indicating their primary mode of movement is quick, short, bursts. The head of a lingcod is unscaled and has a cirrus above the eye. Lingcod's lateral line is prominent and white while the body is covered in cycloid scales. The dorsal fin is composed of spines and rays, separated by a notch. The anal fin also contains 3 spines. Lingcod do not have a swim bladder. Lingcod grow relatively quickly, up to 5 feet (60 inches or 152 centimeters) and 39 kilograms (86 lb), but has been reported to weigh 59 kilograms (130 lb).

=== Polymorphism ===
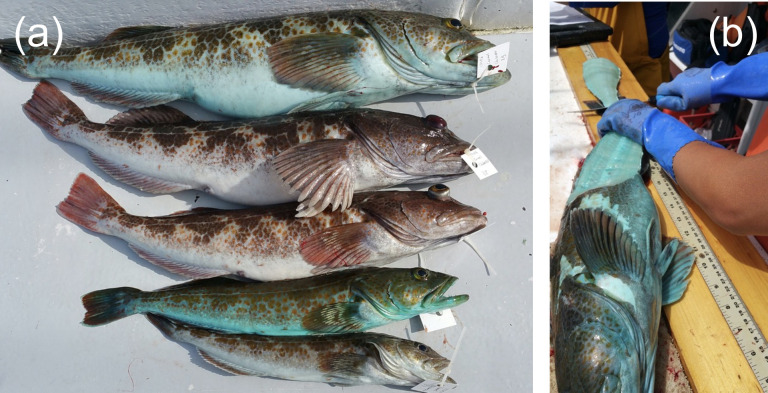
Showing brown and blue color morphs

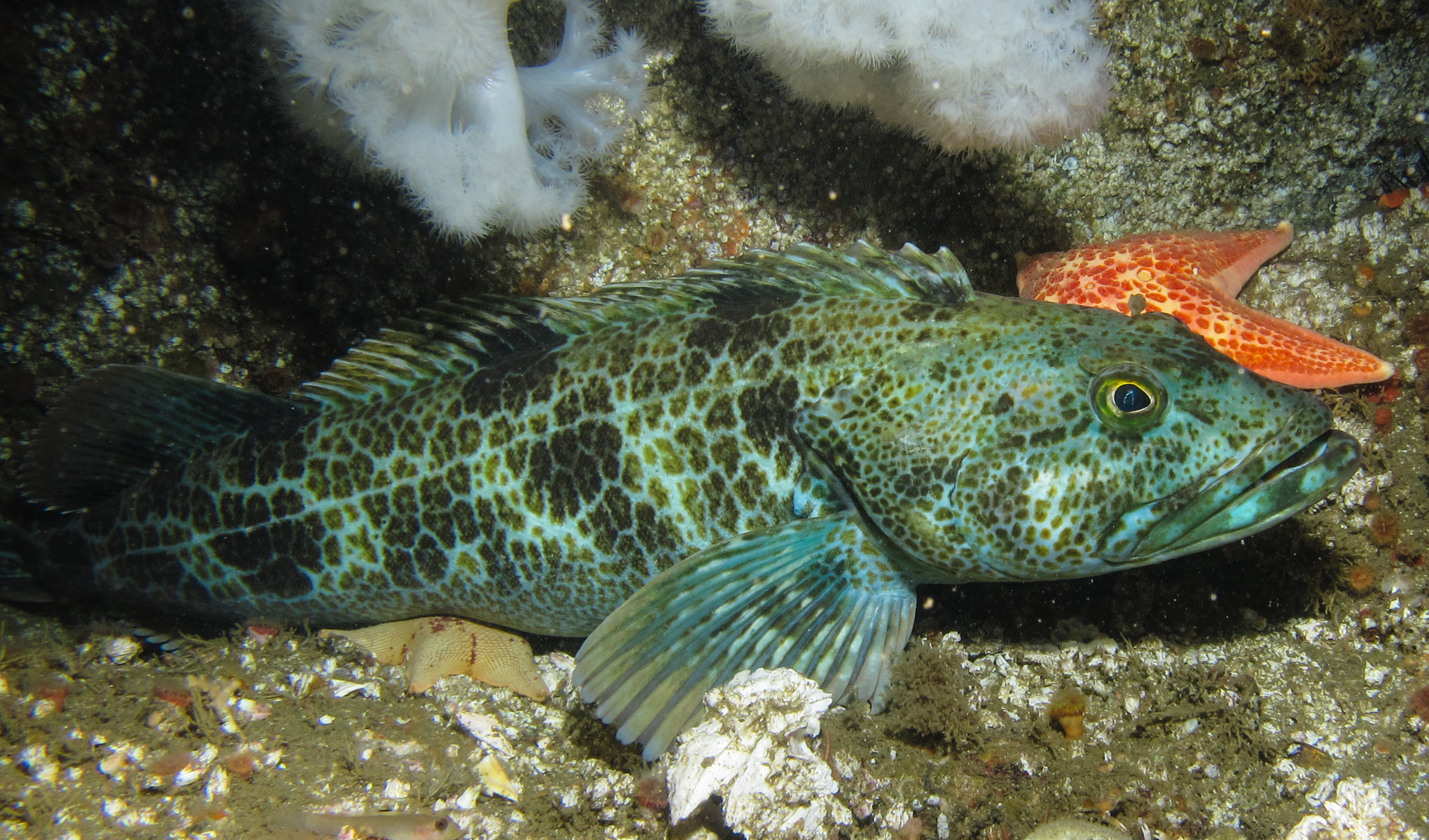
Blue color morph, in California

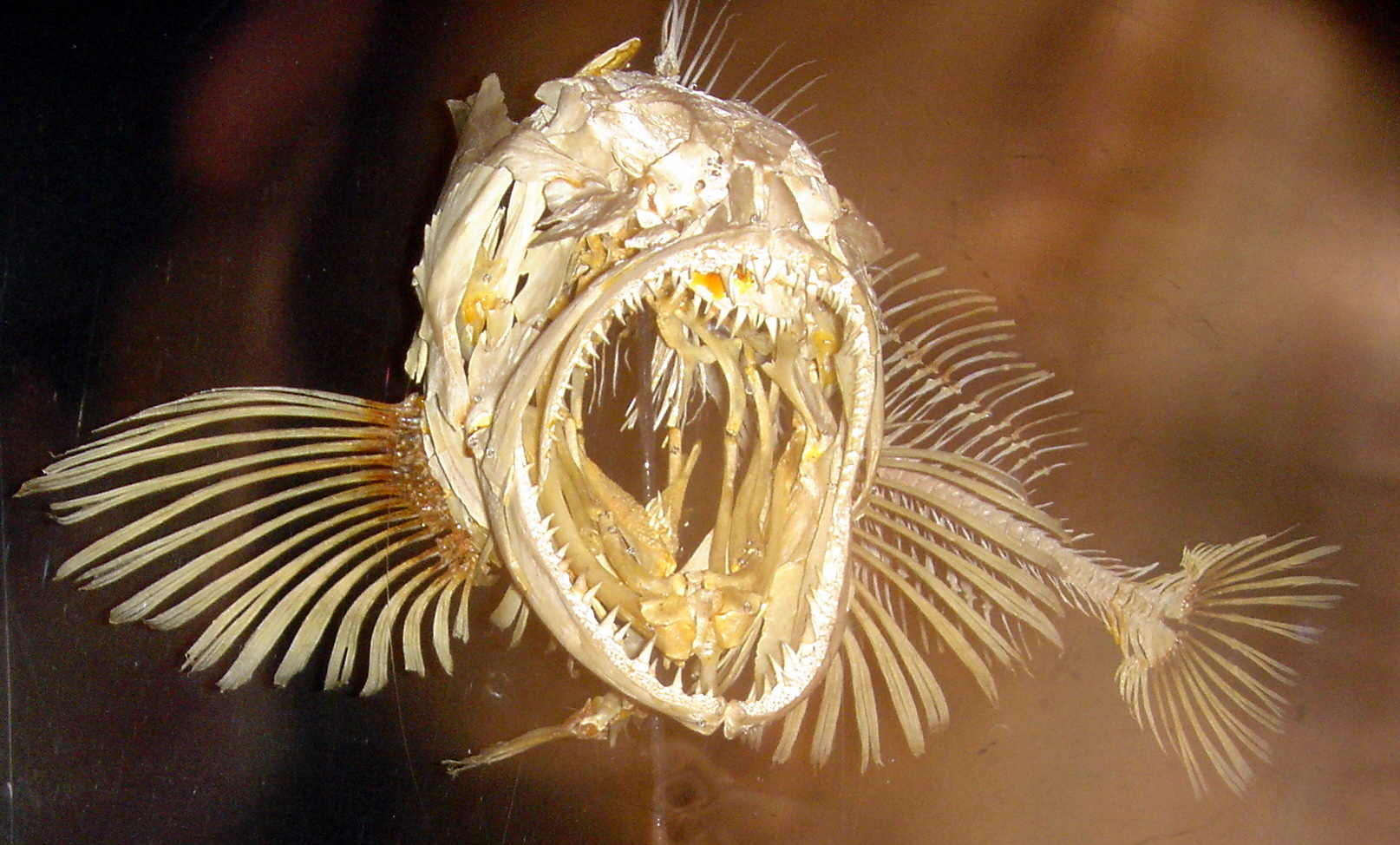
Skeleton of a lingcod

About 20% of the lingcod population in the Pacific Ocean on the west coast of North America presents a blue coloration, while the other 80% presents with the brown coloration morphology. Blue lingcods have blue coloration in both the external and internal tissue. In general, the effect of blue polymorphism observed in other fish species, such as other members of the family Hexagrammidae and family Cottidae, can be from the bile pigment biliverdin. Biliverdin is a product of heme catabolism which circulates the lymph and suffuses tissues. However, this hypothesis has not been tested in lingcod. Dysfunction of the liver or gallbladder may also result in biliverdin permeating tissues and biliverdin is also linked to starvation. Anecdotally, blue coloration in lingcod has been thought to be caused by dietary preferences through the individual preference of the consumption of prey items that have increased levels of biliverdin in their tissue or prey items that trigger biliverdin release. Another species which also experiences blue coloration and lives in the same range of the lingcod is the Cabezon (Scorpaenichthys marmoratus) from the which may support the theory that the coloration depends on the fish's diet and environment.

A study examining the relationship between parasites and lingcods from the coast of Alaska, Washington, and California, USA found that blue male lingcods carried 1.89 times more parasites than their brown counterparts. However, the study found that there was no difference in blue and brown female lingcod regarding parasite burden despite blue coloration being more common in females. The discrepancy in the burden of parasites between male and female lingcod may be because male vertebrates' immune systems are typically less effective than females since male sex hormones have immunocompromising properties.

The same study found that blue lingcod individuals of both sexes have a lower hepatosomatic index value, which may indicate blueness is also an indication of poor body condition. The exact mechanism behind the production of blueness is not yet determined. One explanation includes that parasites may cause physiological damage to the fish, producing blueness as a result. Another possible explanation is that starvation may be the driving factor for blue coloration and parasite burden, but this factor is unmeasurable. Moreover, the study's findings suggest that the immune system may play a role in blue coloration, but when coupled with parasitism expresses a role in the population dynamics of lingcod. Future studies are required for further determination of the cause of polymorphism of lingcod.

== Diet ==
Adult lingcod are aggressive predators. They consume other bottom-dwelling fish, including other lingcod, rockfishes, squid, octopus, and crab. They are "known to prey on almost anything they can get in their mouths."

Larval lingcod feed on zooplankton, krill, and larval crustaceans, while juvenile lingcod feed on small fish.

Lingcod are most vulnerable to predators as eggs and larvae. Adult males therefore guard the egg nests (see next section). But this, as well as their shoreward migration during spawning, makes them vulnerable to predation by seals, sea lions, and anglers.

== Lifecycle and reproduction ==
Lingcod can live for more than 20 years, but typically only live up to 14 years for males and 20 years for females.

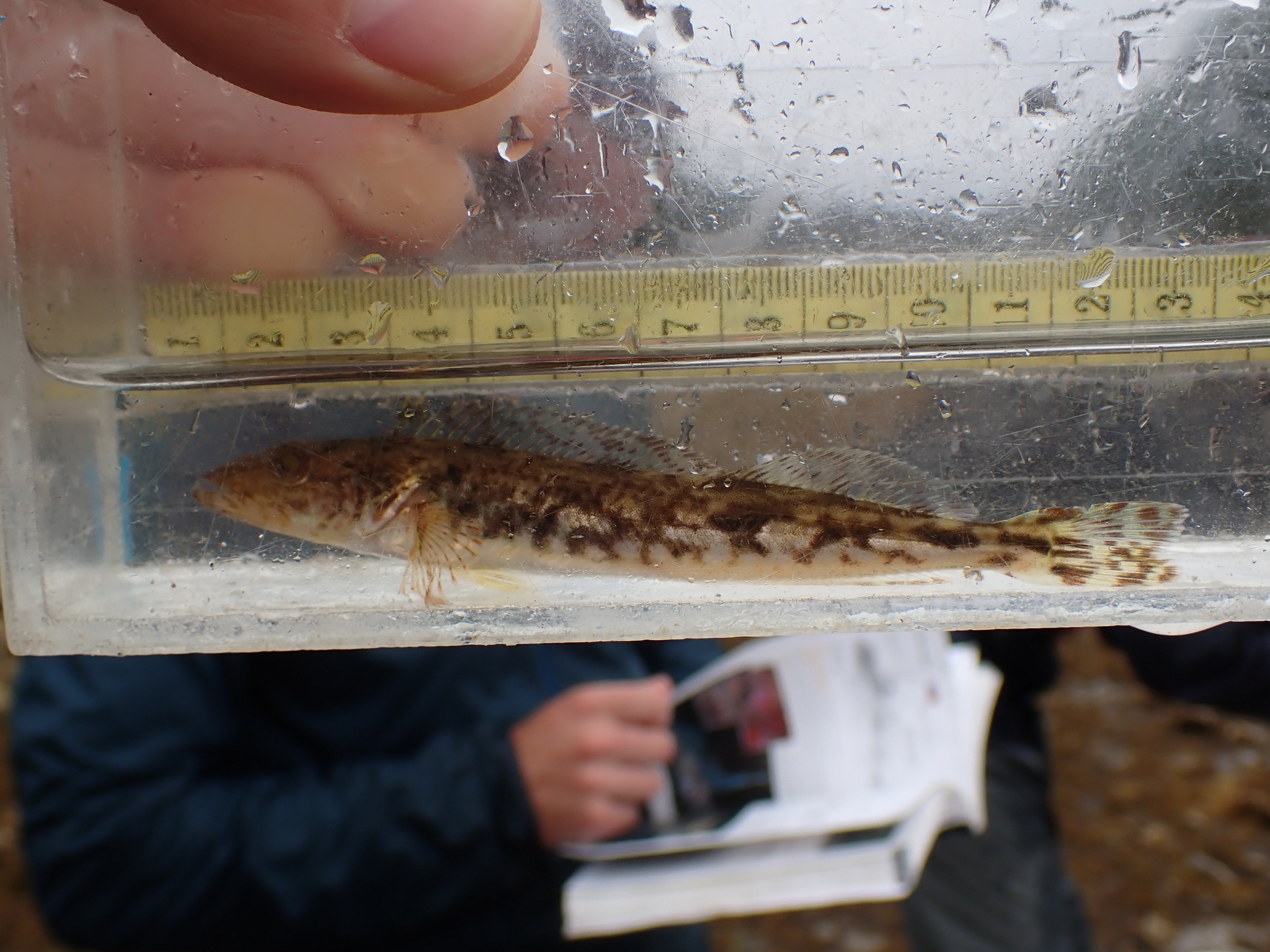
Juvenile, in British Columbia

Starting in November, male lingcod migrate to nearshore spawning grounds and establish territories. Such interannual nest fidelity coupled with great precision of the site is one of the first recorded examples of such behaviors in temperate marine fish. This behavior also provides evidence that male lingcod's selection for nesting sites are a component of prespawning mate attraction behavior.

Spawning likely occurs at night and happens annually between January and March. A female lingcod may lay up to 500,000 eggs in a nest, which she will place under rocks or rocky crevices within a male's territory. The female lingcod will leave the nest site immediately after depositing eggs. Then, the male lingcod will come to fertilize the eggs by spawning. After the eggs are fertilized, the male will actively defend the nest from predators for 6 weeks until the eggs hatch between January and June.

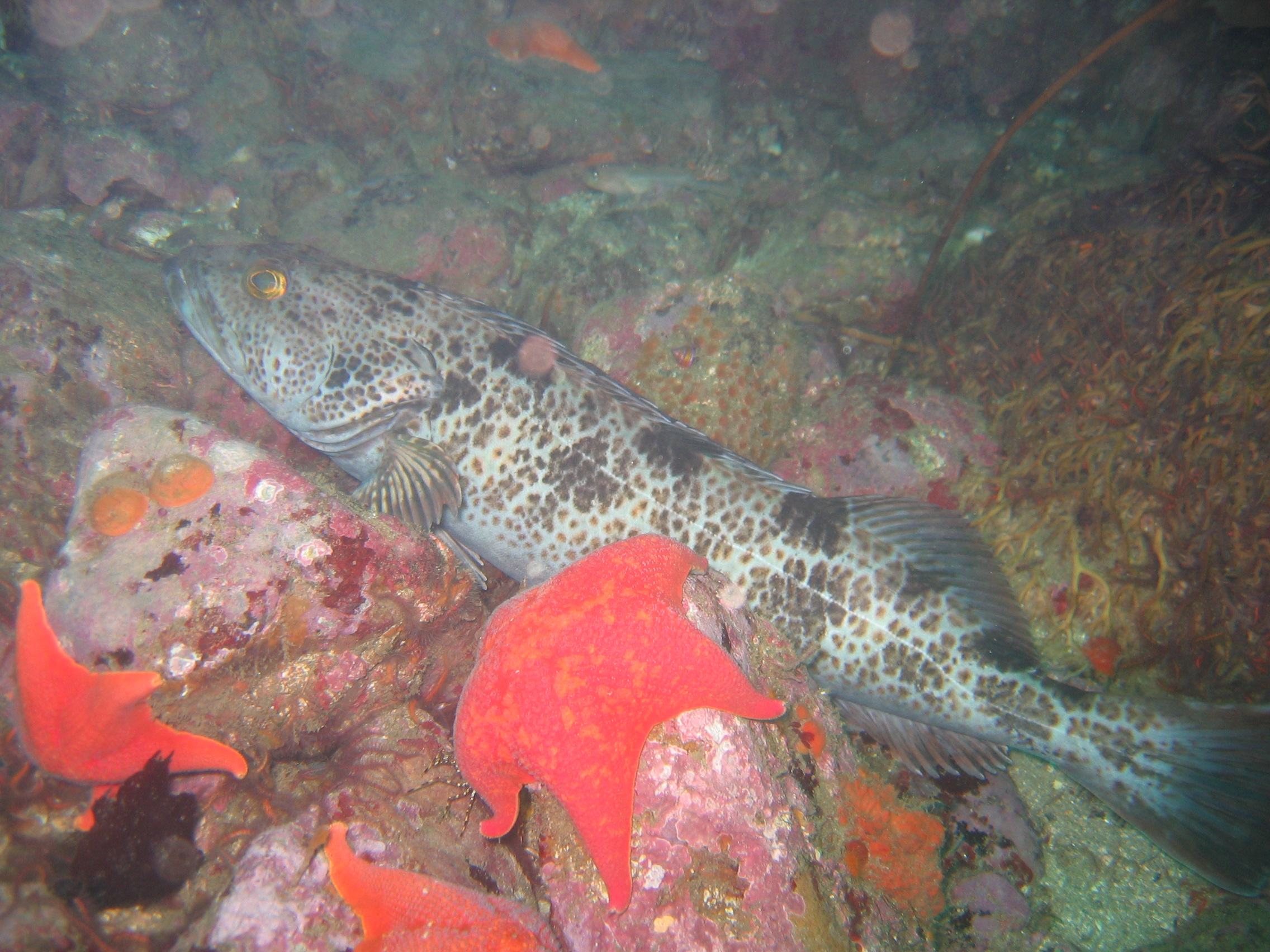
At La Bufadora, Mexico

While male lingcod will normally only defend one nest, it has been observed that male lingcods can defend up to three nests if the nests are within their territory and close enough to each other. Two types of guarding behavior can be observed in male lingcod. The first type of behavior includes a male lying directly on or next to the nest and remaining motionless until disturbed. The second type of behavior includes a male in a sentry post providing active defense when any other fish swim close. This reproductive method is oviparous, which reflects the males guarding the eggs in a nest until the eggs hatch. Oviparous parental care provides offspring care by one, both, or neither parent by maximizing both sexes' fitness through a wide range of mating behaviors from monogamy to polygamy. Usually, like in the case of lingcod, males are the primary caregivers but lingcod also typically follow a polygamous mating structure, which contributes to the effective population size of lingcod.

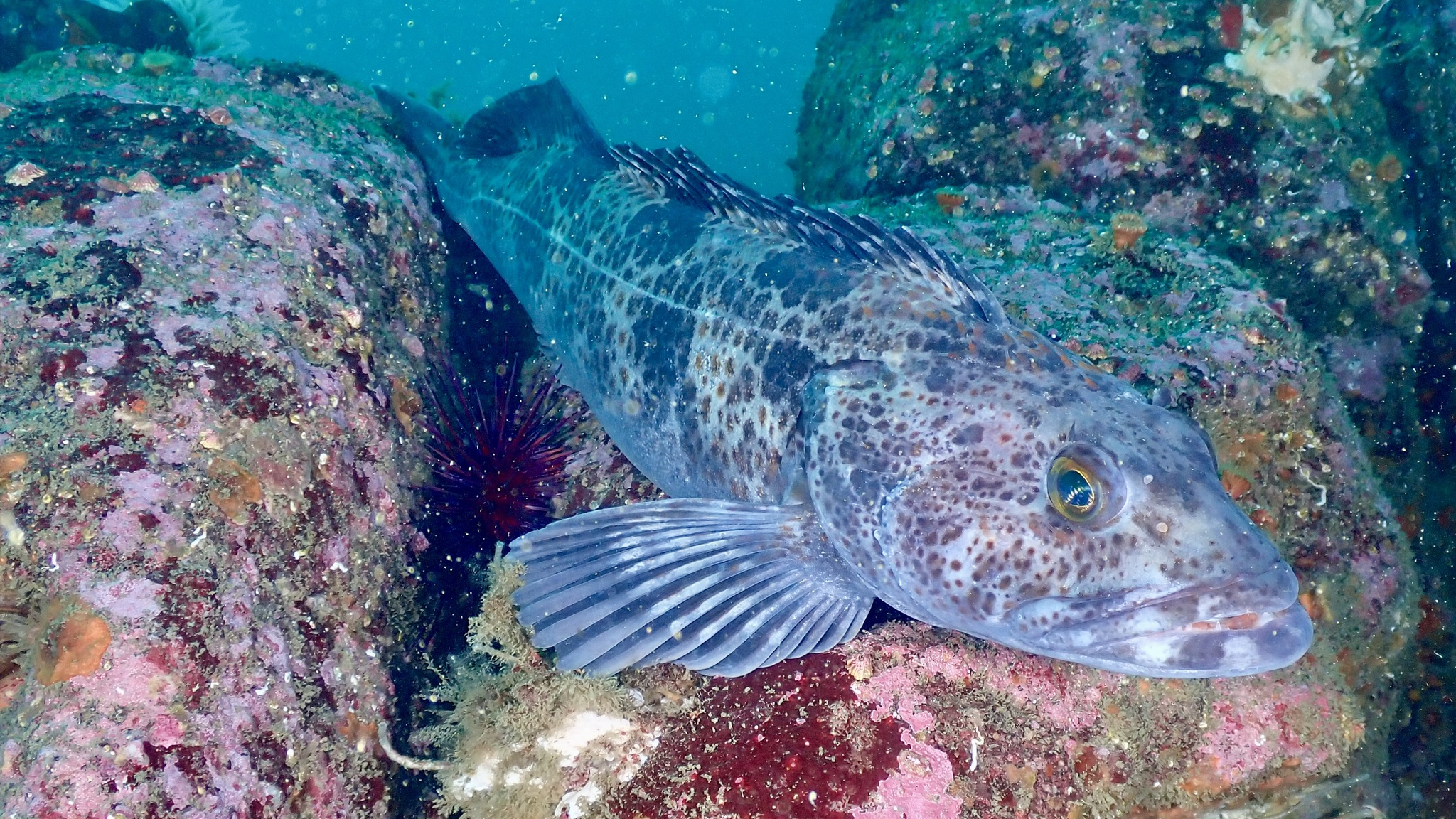
In Monterey, California

The larvae are pelagic until late May or early June, when they filter to the bottom as juveniles. Initially they inhabit eelgrass beds, then move to flat, sandy areas that are not the typical habitat of older lingcod. They eventually settle in habitats of similar relief and substrate as older lingcod but remain at shallower depths for several years.

Females reach sexual maturity when they are three years old and roughly 30 inches long. Males reach sexual maturity when they are two years old and about 20 inches long. An adult male can be distinguished externally from a female by the presence of a small, conical papilla behind the anal vent. Up to age two, males and females grow at similar rates, with both reaching an average length of 45 centimetres (18 in). After age two, females grow faster than males, with the growth of the latter tapering off at about age eight, and the growth of the former continuing until about ages twelve to fourteen.

== Age determination ==
In 1977, Dr. Dick Beamish and Doris Chilton of the Pacific Biological Station published an article showing that cross sections of the fourth to eighth fin rays from the second dorsal fin provided a method for estimating the age of lingcod. This method has since been validated by a mark-recapture study in which lingcod received an injection of oxytetracycline. Other methods of measuring aging, such as those using scales and otoliths, were found to underestimate ages of older fish.

Ages are determined from fins in much the same manner as for other aging structures: sections of varying thickness are examined under a microscope, and the annuli, or rings, that are formed for each year of growth are counted and used to estimate the age. The cross sections must be made at right angles to the length of the fin ray, and it is therefore important that fins be dried flat, with the cut surface at right angles to the fin rays. In addition, the distance the section is cut from the fin ray base is important, so all fins should be collected with the bases intact.

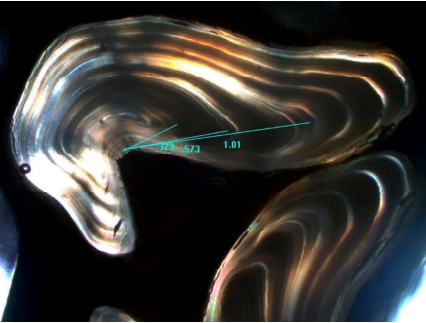
Lingcod fin-ray section with the first three annuli radii measurements in mm. Annuli can be seen in white.

More specifically, in preparation for determining the age of a lingcod, the fourth to eighth rays on the second dorsal fin are used due to having the highest accuracy and readability. Once the rays are cut, the rays are dried in a manner where they lay perpendicular to the cut base for up to three days. Once dried, two layers of cyanoacrylate glue are used to harden the rays, followed by cutting the rays into 1–2mm wide sections from the start of the fin base with a PACE Pico high-speed saw. This usually provides 5–6 ray sections that can be examined under a microscope slide in addition to two layers of medium viscosity mounting fluid.

To determine the age of a lingcod, the number of annuli is counted. Annuli are the translucent zones that form during winter growth yearly. Summer and spring growth result in an opaque zone. Checks or fine, translucent rings may also result from summer growth.

One problem associated with using fin rays to age older fish is the center may be resorbed, resulting in the loss of the first two annuli. It is therefore necessary to determine an average width for the first two annuli by examining the fins from juvenile fish. This measurement can then be used to estimate the position of the third annulus on older fish.

== Nutrition ==
Nutrition information for lingcod is as follows.

Serving Size	100g
=== Calories ===	88 kcal
=== Protein ===	19.1 g
Protein calories: 82 kcal Protein calories % : 0.7 g	
=== Fat ===	0.7 g
Fat calories: 7 kcal Fat calories % : 7.6%	
=== Carbohydrate ===	0.0 g
Carbohydrate calories: 0 kcal Carbohydrate calories % : 0.0%	
Cholesterol	73.6 mg
Sodium	51.5 mg

Serving Size	per 100g	per 100 kcal
Omega 3 (EPA+DHA)	361 mg	413 mg
Vitamin B3	1.8 mg	2.1 mg
Vitamin B6	0.2 mg	0.2 mg
Vitamin B12	1.1 mcg	1.3 mcg
Vitamin D	<43 IU	<49 IU
Vitamin E	0 mg	0 mg
Calcium	6.7 mg	7.7 mg
Magnesium	25.5 mg	29.2 mg
Phosphorus	226 mg	259 mg
Potassium	470 mg	538 mg
Selenium	50 mcg	57 mcg

== Conservation ==
According to the NOAA Fisheries, both population stocks (The Northern Pacific Coast and Southern Pacific Coast stocks) of lingcod are not overfished as of the 2021 stock assessment and are not subjected to overfishing based on 2021 catch data. More information and updated information may be found at Stock SMART (noaa.gov) for the Northern Pacific stock and Stock SMART (noaa.gov) for the Southern Pacific stock.

The Alaska Department of Fish and Game conservatively manages lingcod in Alaska to prevent overfishing as it is hard for Lingcod to recover from overfishing events. Such management includes protecting female lingcod that are spawning and male lingcod who are nest-guarding by keeping sport and commercial fisheries closed during those two periods. Minimum size limits of lingcod are also established to prevent the harvest of immature fish in order to allow fish to spawn at least once before harvest. There are also catch limits, where the sporting side of fishing is restricted by a daily bag and possession limit, and the commercial side is restricted by bycatch and bycatch quotas.

Under the Washington Department of Fish and Wildlife, lingcod are identified as a Priority Species under the WDFW's Priority Habitat and Species Program. This provides lingcod protective measures for their survival due to factors such as their population status, sensitivity to habitat alteration, and/or recreational, commercial, or tribal importance.

The California Department of Fish and Wildlife works closely with NOAA Fisheries, other states, and the Pacific Fishery Management Council (PFMC) to manage lingcod in addition to other groundfishes on a sustainable basis. This management is under the federal Groundfish Fishery Management Plan (GFMP) implemented by the PFMC in 1982 which facilitates the joint jurisdiction of the states and the federal government. However, federal and local regulations still apply for fishing and recreation use regarding lingcod to protect habitat and other sensitive fish populations.

Habitat conservation is also of concern for lingcod as younger lingcod typically inhabit shallow waters near vegetation of kelp or eelgrass beds. Such kelp and eelgrass beds are very susceptible to natural and anthropogenic impacts and thus are declining worldwide, pushing younger lingcod to more structurally complex habitats such as hard and mixed substrates.

Lingcod is harvested alongside bottom longline and salmon troll fisheries. When trawls are used to harvest lingcod, there are varying degrees of disruption to the ocean floor which impacts habitat. There is a lesser degree of disruption when trawls are used on soft, sandy, or muddy ocean floors. It has been reported that charter boat fishermen in Washington, CA use an alternative bait, large flatfish, to better target lingcod while decreasing yelloweye rockfish bycatch.

Historically, in 1997, Lingcod were declared overfished, ranging from Washington to California. In 2005 they were declared restored, thanks to restrictive fishing regulations and favorable oceanographic conditions.

== Fisheries & recreation ==
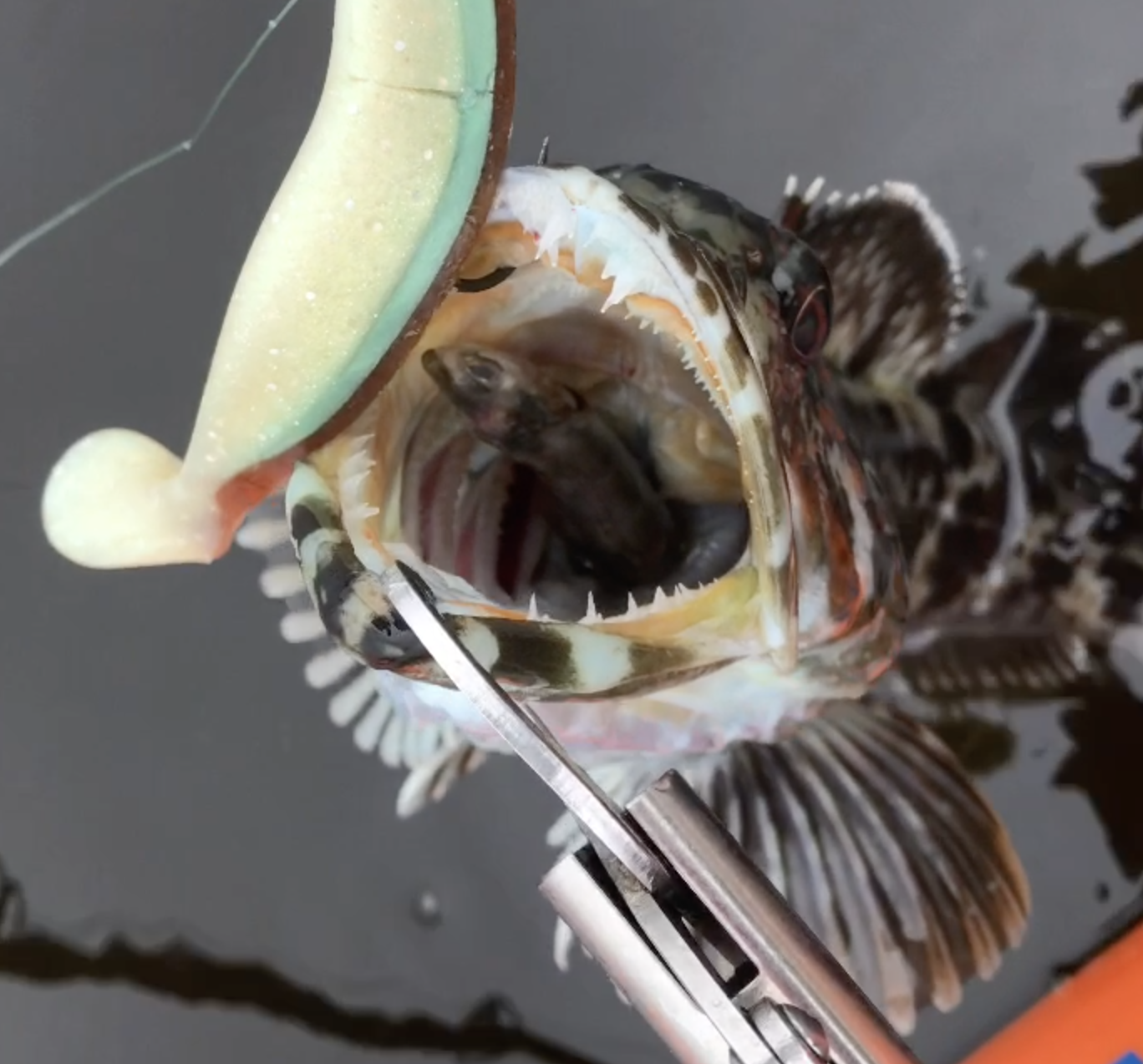
Lingcod caught using swim-bait in Pacifica, CA, USA. Note regurgitation of stomach contents during retrieve, frequently reported by fishermen.

Historically, lingcod has been harvested by many indigenous coastal populations within Southeast, Southcentral, and Western Alaska. Traditionally, they were caught for subsistence use with wooden or bone hooks. Today, lingcod is still harvested for subsistence alongside commercial fisheries with longlines, trolls, and jigs.

Management includes size limits, trip limits, the opening and closing of certain seasons or areas, gear restrictions that can limit bycatch and further impacts to the habitat, and a trawl rationalization catch share program. The trawl rationalization catch share program is a program that is based on catch limits which are constructed from the health of each fish stock. This is then divided into shares and given to individual fishermen and groups. Such management is under the Pacific Coast Groundfish Fishery Management Plan.

In 2022, 1.8 million pounds of lingcod were harvested commercially, which was valued at $2.7 million. Commercial harvest equipment varies by sector but can include different hook-and-line gear, gill nets, trawls, and traps. Lingcod may be sold fresh, dead, alive, or frozen in the US and in exports.

Recreation fishing for lingcod occurs throughout the West Coast, including Alaska. 1.3 million pounds of lingcod were harvested by recreational anglers in 2021. There are restrictions to sizes and the number of Lingcod that can be kept each day. Legal equipment includes hook and line as well as spear gear.

== Gallery ==
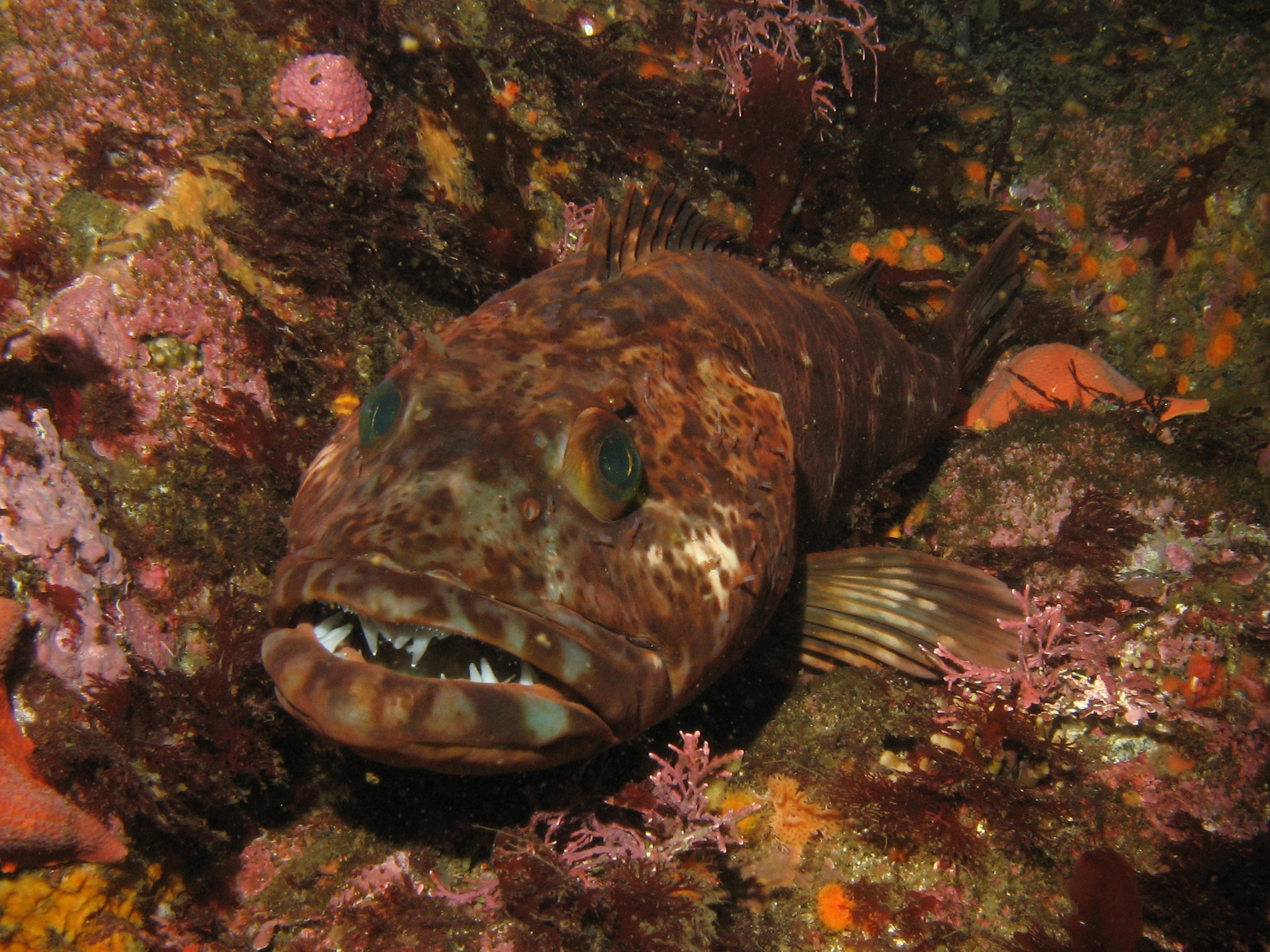
Lingcod shows its teeth

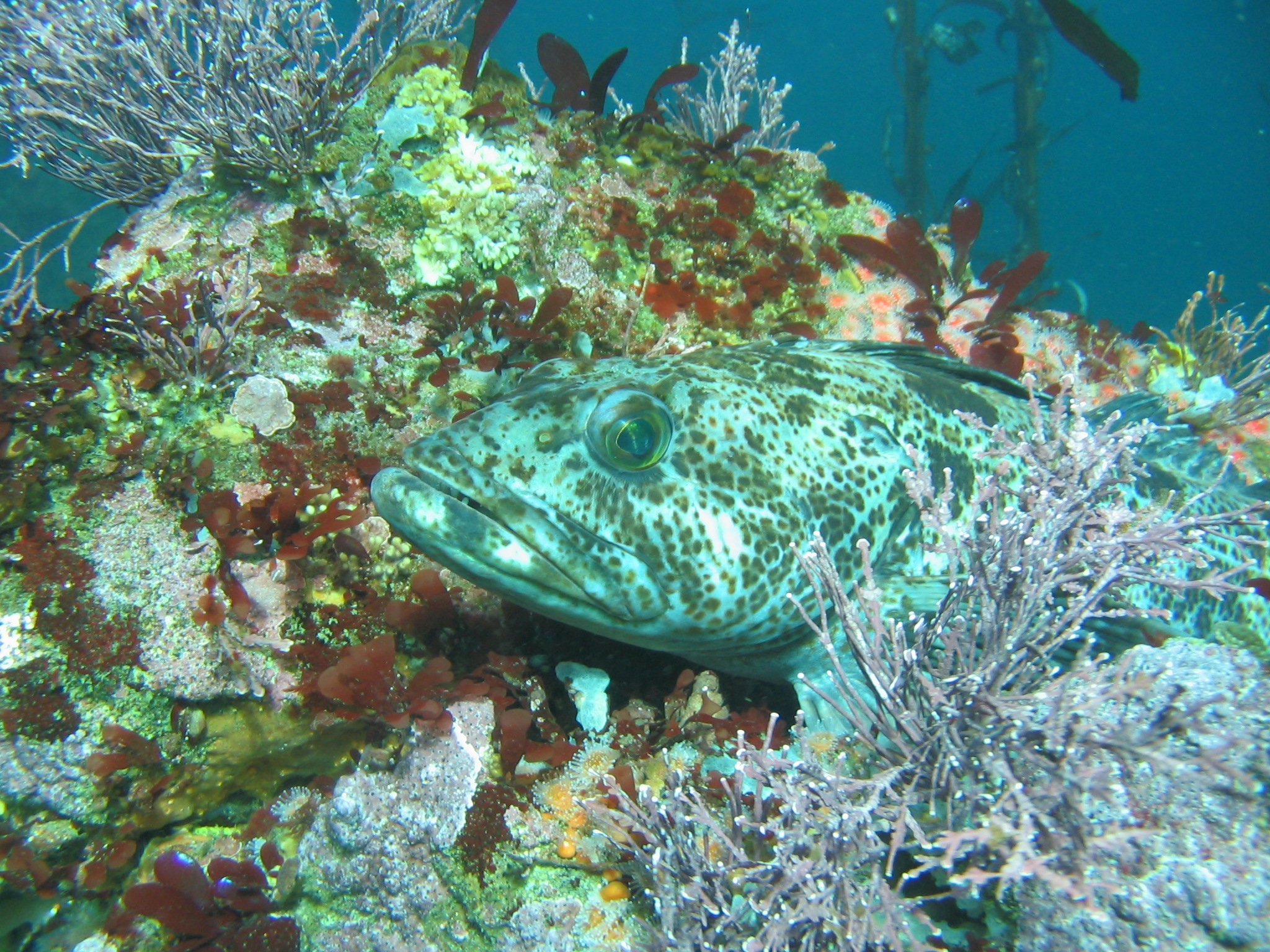
Lingcod hides motionless on a reef

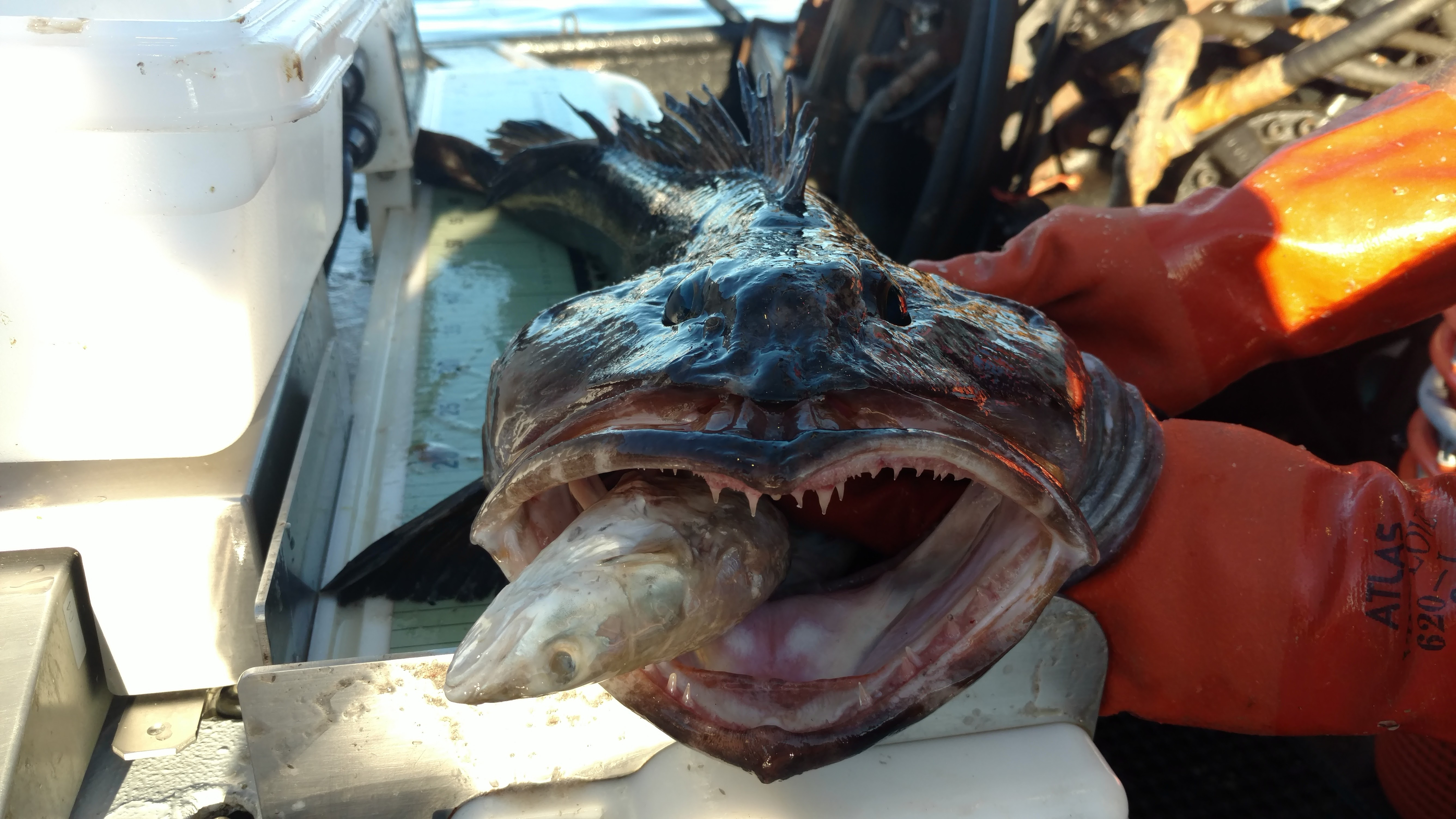
Lingcod with a small regurgitated sablefish in its mouth
