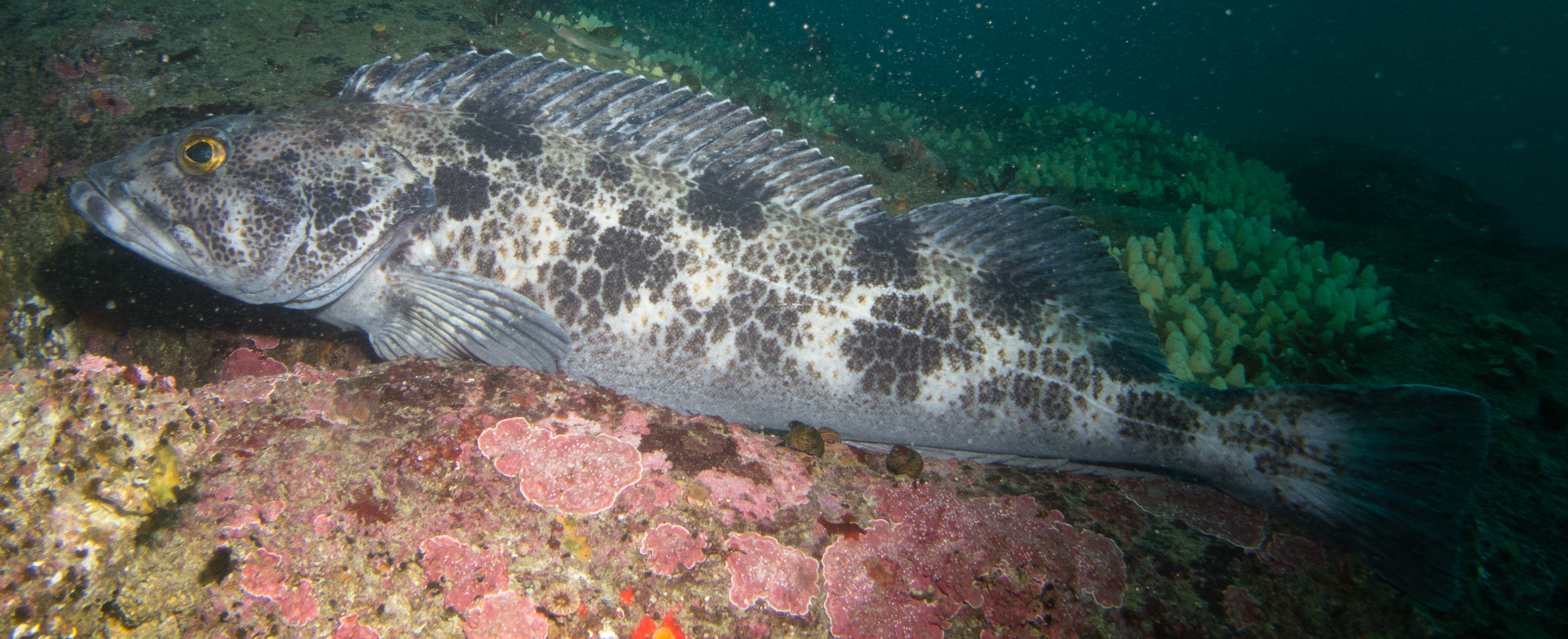
- Lingcod (Ophiodon elongatus)

Scientific classification
- Kingdom: Animalia
- Phylum: Chordata
- Class: Actinopterygii
- Division: Teleostei
- Order: Perciformes
- Suborder: Cottoidei
- Superfamily: Hexagrammoidea
- Family: Hexagrammidae
- Subfamily: Ophiodontinae
- Genus: Ophiodon; Girard, 1854

Type species
- Ophiodon elongatus Girard, 1854

Species
- see text

Synonyms
- Oplopoma Girard, 1856

= Ophiodon =

Genus of greenling

Ophiodon is a genus of marine ray-finned fishes belonging to the family Hexagrammidae, the greenlings. It is found in the northeastern Pacific Ocean.

== Species ==
Ophiodon has one extant species and one known extinct species:

- Ophiodon elongatus Girard, 1854 (Lingcod)
- †Ophiodon ozymandias Jordan, 1907
