= Green Lung =

British rock band

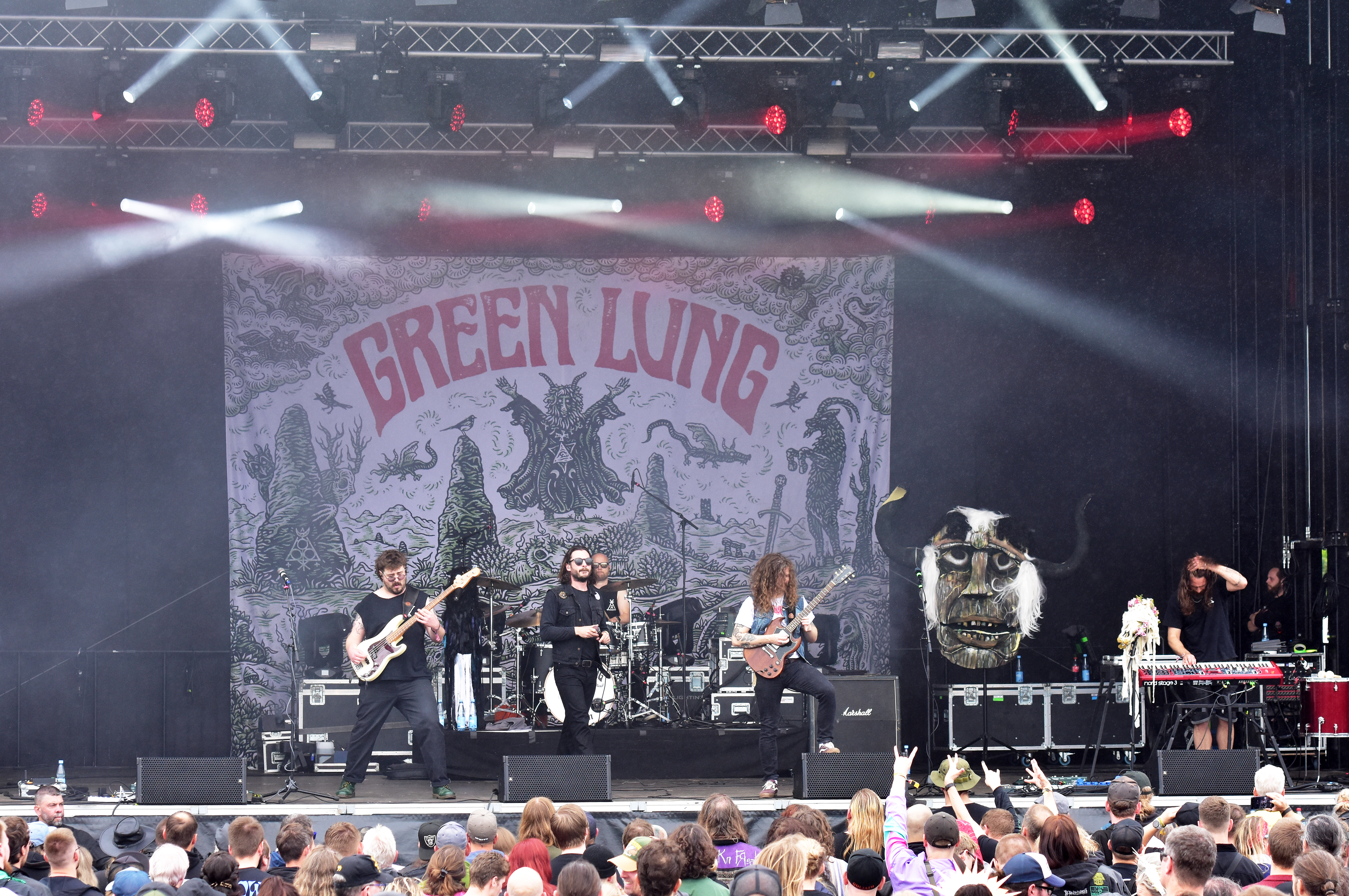
- Green Lung at Reload Festival 2024

Background information
- Origin: South London, England
- Genres: Stoner metal; doom metal; hard rock; psychedelia
- Years active: 2017–present
- Label: Nuclear Blast Records
- Members: Joseph Ghast (bass); Matt Wiseman (drums); Scott Black (guitars); Tom Templar (vocals); John Wright (organ)
- Website: greenlung.co.uk

Green Lung is a British stoner/doom metal band formed in 2017 in London, currently signed to Nuclear Blast Records.

== History ==
Green Lung began by playing to small audiences in local London pubs. From here, the band's first signing was with German independent label Kosmic Artifactz, with whom they released their first EP, Free the Witch in 2018, and then their first LP Woodland Rites in March 2019. This latter release saw significant critical acclaim within the relevant specialist press, with Rich Webb of Distorted Sound magazine describing it as "simply incredible" and Dave Knowles of Metal Temple calling it an "instant classic".

They then signed with Finnish doom metal specialist label Svart Records in 2020. Vocalist Tom Templar said at interview that the band chose Svart over an unidentified larger label, calling them the "last bastion of music industry good". In 2021 the band played at Bloodstock festival, before releasing the album Black Harvest in October of that year. This release again received positive reviews, this time from larger publications including Kerrang!.

The band signed with Nuclear Blast Records in July 2022, before playing a set at Damnation Festival in November, again to positive coverage including from Kerrang!

They supported Clutch in an international tour in late 2022.

In November 2023, they released their third studio album, This Heathen Land. The album went to #1 in both the British Rock & Metal and Independent Album Breakers charts. It received significant critical acclaim, including a rare full 5Ks in Kerrang! magazine as well as being named one of the top 10 best records of the year by Loudersound. In 2026 it was named as one of the best albums of the decade by Metal Hammer magazine.

Following the album the band went on to tour Europe and the UK, including a sold out show at the O2 Kentish Town Forum.

In 2024 the band embarked on their debut tour of the USA, supported by Castle Rat on a 3 week run of the East Coast.

Following a run of main stage appearances including Bloodstock, Brutal Assault, Rockharz and Mystic they have been announced as the headliners of the 2026 edition of Desertfest.

Their fourth album, Necropolitan, was released on September 11 2026. Recorded largely live at Rockfield Studios by producer Tom Dalgety, Necropolitan is their best selling album to date, hitting #25 in the Official UK Albums Chart, #4 in the Official Scottish Album Charts and #27 in the Official German Albums Chart.

It earned widespread critical praise, receiving another full 5Ks from Kerrang! magazine while Metal Hammer gave it 9/10 and called it "yet another resounding success for Britain's hottest doom metal band". In their 9/10 review Distorted Sound called it "their quintessential album".

In December 2026 they will be embarking on the "Dance to the Grave Tour" with special guests High on Fire and Gnome. It will be their biggest tour to date, headlining iconic venues such as London's Roundhouse, the Bataclan in Paris and 013 in Tilburg.

== Influences and musical style ==
Green Lung's musical style has been described as drawing heavily from British classic rock and early heavy metal, with Queen, Deep Purple and especially Black Sabbath's 1970s material cited as audible influences by reviewers.

The band's lyrical and visual theming are influenced by 1960s and 70s folk horror films and also by British folklore such as the Green Man and the Pendle witches.

The band works with English graphic designer and illustrator Richard Wells, who has designed the covers and vinyl inserts for their albums and their EP, as well as merchandise and stage backdrops. The art produced in his work with Green Lung is inspired by Wells's own linocut art style and evokes the same folklore and horror themes as their lyrics.

== Discography ==
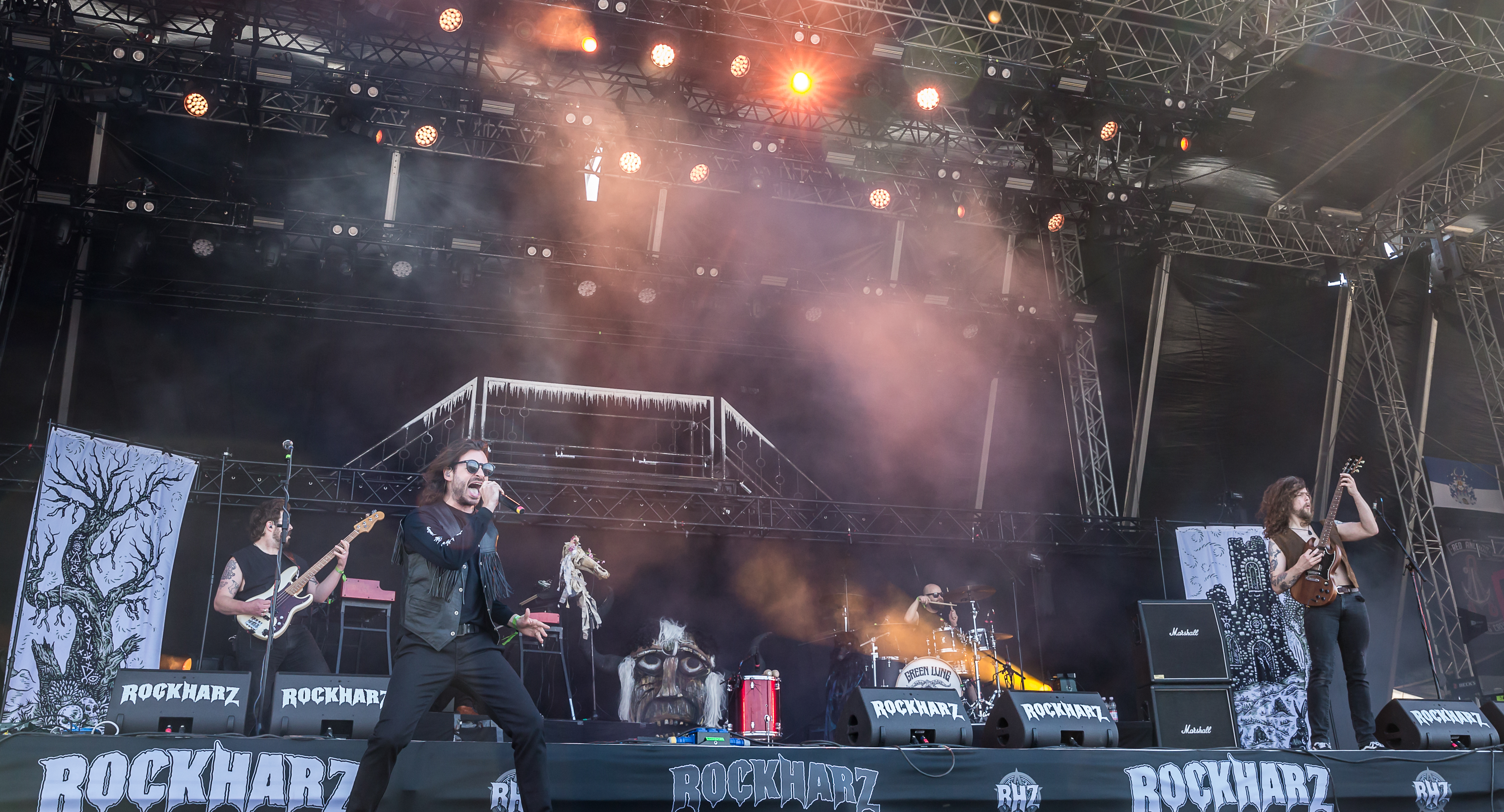
Green Lung at Rockharz Open Air 2025 in Germany

Studio albums

- Woodland Rites (2019)
- Black Harvest (2021)
- This Heathen Land (2023)
- Necropolitan (2026)

EP

- Free the Witch (2018)

Demo

- Green Man Rising (2017)

Singles

- "Lady Lucifer" (2018)
- "Let the Devil In" (2019)
- "Leaders of the Blind" (2021)
- "Reaper's Scythe" (2021)
- "Graveyard Sun" (2021)
- "Upon the Altar" (2021)
- "Mountain Throne" (2023)
- "Maxine (Witch Queen)" (2023)
- "One for Sorrow" (2023)
- "Evil in This House" (2026)
