= Ozymandias (short story) =

"Nightwings"
- Short story by Robert Silverberg
- Genre: Science fiction

Publication
- Publisher: Infinity Science Fiction
- Publication date: November 1958

"Ozymandias" is a science fiction novella by Robert Silverberg. It was originally published in 1958 in Infinity Science Fiction.

An interstellar military expedition reaches an unknown planet, where a robot with an incredible memory is found, full of secrets.
