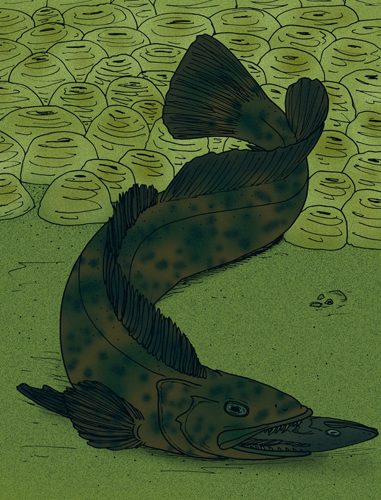
- Artist's restoration of O. ozymandias

Scientific classification
- Domain: Eukaryota
- Kingdom: Animalia
- Phylum: Chordata
- Class: Actinopterygii
- Order: Perciformes
- Suborder: Cottoidei
- Family: Hexagrammidae
- Genus: Ophiodon
- Species: †O. ozymandias

Binomial name
- †Ophiodon ozymandias Jordan, 1921

= Ophiodon ozymandias =

Extinct species of fish

Ophiodon ozymandias is an extinct species of lingcod from the Late Miocene of Southern California.
